= Religion in Tsarist Russia =

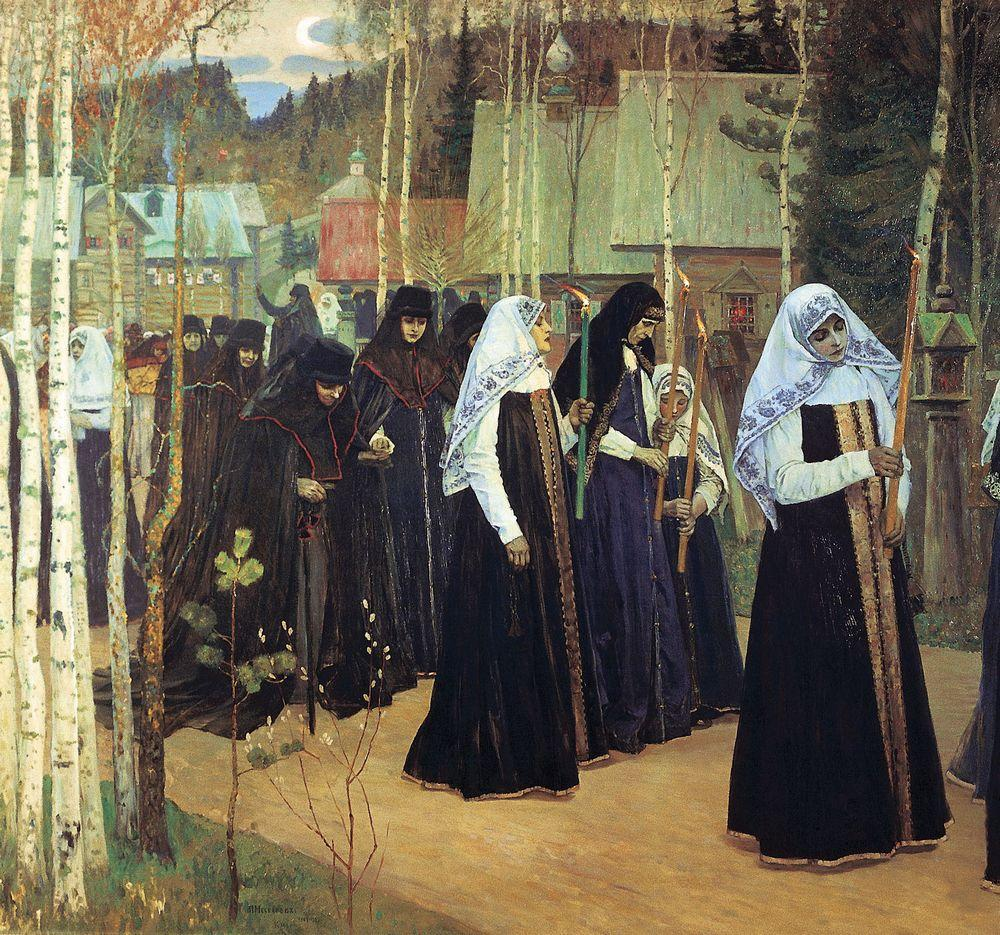
The Great Taking of the Veil, by Mikhail Nesterov (c. 1897)

Tsarist Russia was officially an Eastern Orthodox state. As the state religion, it held precedence over all other faiths and the policy and culture around religion in Tsarist Russia oriented around this fact. Eastern Orthodoxy served not only as the official religious doctrine, but the foundational cultural nexus for the entirety of the Tsarist society and state. The Tsarist state and Church held a symbiotic relationship, in which the Church legitimized the Tsar's right to rule by divine right while the state provided the Church with resources, protection, and doctrinal enforcement.

Christianity came to Russia via the Byzantine Empire around the time of the foundation of the Kievan Rus. Through this, the East Slavs joined with the Byzantines in formally establishing the Eastern Orthodox Church during the Great Schism in the mid-11th century. In the late Middle Ages, religion became to play an increasing role in Russian life in the aftermath of the traumatic Mongol invasions and the decline of the Byzantine Empire, which prompted the idea of Russia being the successor to the Byzantines. In 1448, the Russian Church declared autocephaly after the unpopular Florentine Council, in which the Byzantines agreed to a reunion with the Catholic Church. The idea of Third Rome resulted in the Russian Tsar gaining increased power over religious affairs, culminating in a schism in the late 17th century as liturgical reforms pushed by the Patriarch Nikon led to much backlash that manifested itself in armed and political resistance. Under Peter the Great, the church lost real political power, with the Moscow Patriarchy being abolished, only being reestablished after the February Revolution.

Tsarist attitudes towards non-Orthodox individuals varied widely over the state's history, ranging from state-sanctioned and accommodated tolerance to attempted assimilation. Amongst Christians, Russia saw itself as the protector of various Eastern Christian groups, many of whom lived in the Ottoman Empire, leading to conflict. Catholics generally saw the most discrimination amongst other Christian groups, with targeted conversion efforts ramping up in Tsarist Russia's last century following the annexation of the Polish–Lithuanian Commonwealth. The partitions also saw the influx of large amounts of Jews into the empire, who were subject to both state and popular discrimination. Muslims comprised the largest share on non-Christians and were initially subject to conversionary efforts before largely being granted tolerance as time went on, with the Caucasus being an exception. Additionally, the nomadic peoples of the steppe gave the empire populations of Buddhists, Tengrists, and Animists.

== History of Tsarist religious policy ==
=== Third Rome ===
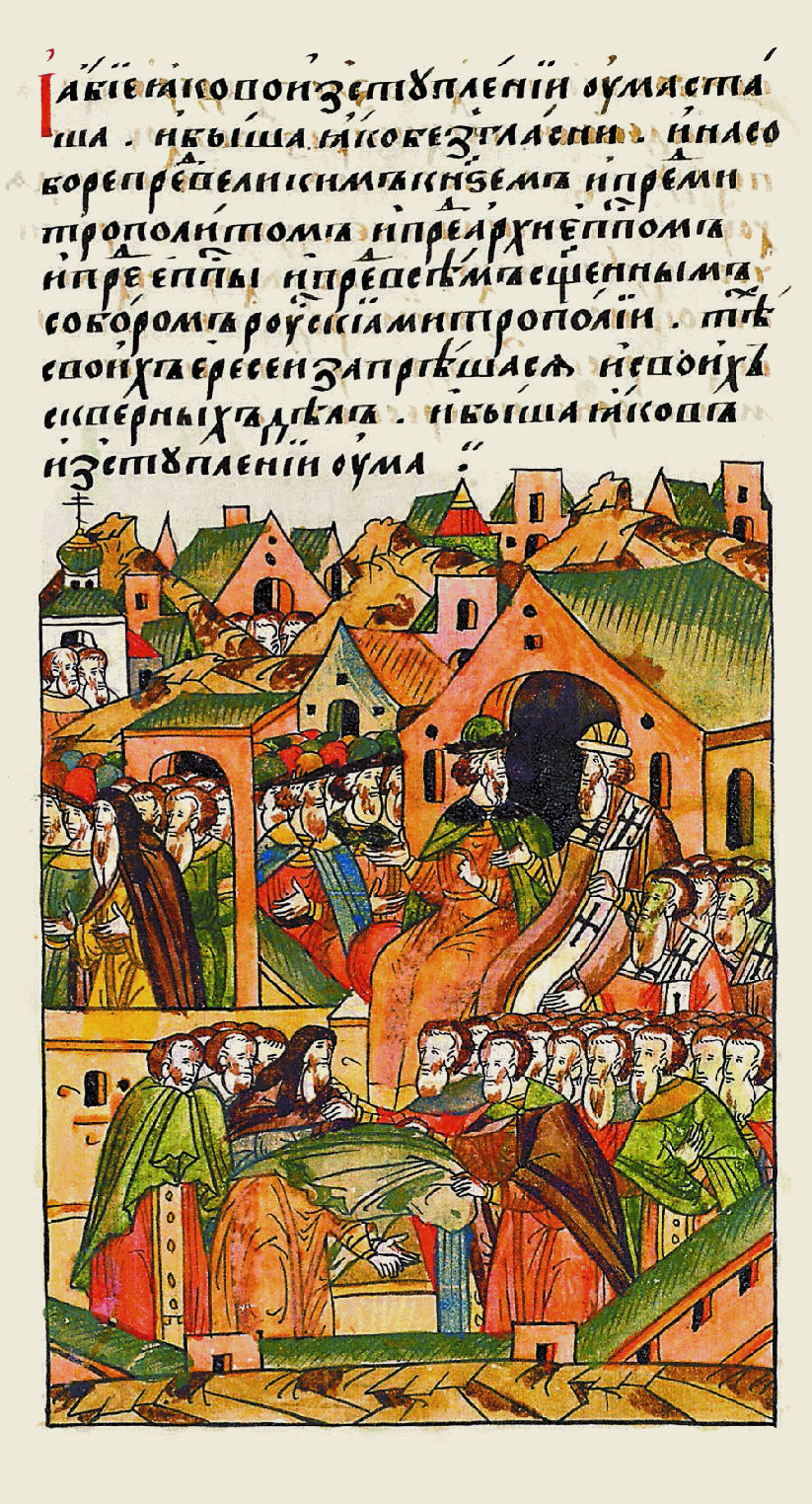
The sobor of 1490, from the Illustrated Chronicle of Ivan the Terrible, late 16th century

Christianity had arrived in Russia via the Byzantines, who began converting the Rus in the 10th century. Under Vladimir the Great in 988, the Baptism of the Kievan Rus took place as he and many others converted to Christianity, and the religion would become the dominaint faith by the time of its demise during the High Middle Ages. Being culturally influenced by the Byzantines, it joined the Eastern Orthodox Church amidst the Great Schism of the mid-11th century. In the aftermath of the Mongol conquest, monasticism began gripping Russia, becoming a staple of late medieval Russian Orthodoxy. Propagated by men such as the 14th century saint Sergius of Radonezh, the monastic revival helped prompt a new wave of conversion efforts by the Church, such as Stephen of Perm, who evangelized the Permians at the end of the 14th century.

The Byzantine Empire went into decline in the late Middle Ages, suffering increasingly from poor leadership, internal divisions, and external excursions. In the late 14th century, they began to be increasingly threatened by the rising Ottoman Empire, who also began threatening Christian Europe and especially the Balkans. As the Ottoman Empire continued to grow in prominence and the Byzantines grew more weak, the idea of Byzantium's Roman legacy being inherited became a more front of mind topic. Part of the reason behind the Great Schism was that the Western Catholic Church had claimed that the Holy Roman Emperor was the true holder of the Roman imperial title, while the Eastern Orthodoxs claimed the Byzantine emperor was. As the Ottomans continued to absorb not just Byzantine territory, but most independent Orthodox polities, Muscovy gradually began to emerge as the only seriously powerful Orthodox state. After the Bulgarian city of Tarnovo was captured by the Ottomans in 1393, a number of exiled Bulgarian clergy took refuge in Russia and began exporting the idea of a "Third Rome" there. This idea gained further prominence, especially when the Byzantines attempted to rejoin the Catholic Church in 1439 in a desperate bid to garner Western support against the Ottomans. This move, unpopular throughout the Eastern Orthodox world, prompted the Russian Church to declare autocephaly in 1448.

The independence of the Russian Church, which would eventually be recognized by Constantinople in 1589, marked the establishment of what would become the Moscow Patriarchate, elevating the leader of the Russian Church to the rank of Patriarch. In what became known as the conciliar period of the Russian Church, the institution began to assert itself as a major, and eventually preeminent force in the Eastern Orthodox world. A landmark event of this was the Stoglav of 1551. The result of a synod, it regulated canon law and ecclesiastical life in Russia for the next century. Though this helped standardize religious practice in Russia, it had the effect of furthering the separation of the practices of the Russian Church and the other Orthodox churches.

Also as part of this process, the church began to more firmly integrate with the Russian state apparatus. The Idea of a "Third Rome" continued to gain prominence across the Eastern Orthodox world as the Ottoman Empire conquered Constantinople in 1453 and subsequentially spent the remainder of the 15th century absorbing most of the remaining Eastern Orthodox polities. Tales told by men such as Nestor Iskander stated that the Rus would eventually defeat the Muslims and retake Tsargrad, the Slavic name for Constantinople; such narratives garnered widespread popularity as Russia emerged as the last free bastion of the Orthodox faith. By the end of the 15th century, this idea of Moscow being the successor to Byzantium had become part of Russian policy, with Ivan the Great taking on the title of tsar in 1484, marrying Sophia Palaiologina, the cousin of the last Byzantine emperor, and using Byzantine imperial imagery such as the double-headed eagle to assert a political and religious connection with the Byzantines and thus Roman civilization. This would later be formalized by Ivan the Terrible in 1547, when he would declare himself Tsar of all Russia, establishing the Russian Tsardom.

The growing power of Tsarist autocracy meant that the Tsar garnered extraordinary influence over religious affairs, and gradually the Russian Church emerged as a stooge of the state. The Tsarist era saw its share of schisms and heretics. The Judaizers, an group of heretic Christians who were accused of adhering to Judaism, were persecuted after the sobor (synod) of 1490, with many being burned. Under Ivan the Terrible, a myriad of clergy who went against him were oppressed and killed, including Philip II, Metropolitan of Moscow. Nevertheless, the preeminence of Eastern Orthodoxy was twice threatened in the early 17th century during the Time of Troubles. False Dmitry I, one of many usurpers during that time period, took power in 1605, off the back of support from Russia's principal enemy at the time, Poland–Lithuania; in exchange for his support, he publicly converted to Roman Catholicism, since the PLC was Catholic. This created unease in Russia, and this was worsened as rumors circulated that he had secretly promise to join the Russian Church with the Holy See. It was custom for a Russian Tsar upon marrying their wife to convert to Eastern Orthodoxy if they already were not. Russia's only Catholic Tsar did not make his wife, the Polish noblewoman Marina Mniszech, convert; prompting enough backlash to contribute to his toppling the next year. Later, the primacy of Orthodoxy in Russia would be under threat when the Commonwealth launched an invasion of Russia that resulted in Moscow being occupied for several years. The events, as well as the broader period of instability engendered a new sense of religiosity in Russian society as the ill times that had fallen upon the Tsardom were blamed on a lack of devotion.

=== The raskol and Petrine settlement ===
1887 painting by Vasily Surikov, showcasing the arrest of Muscovite Old Believer Feodosia Morozova. In protest, she holds two fingers, rather than three, raised in the old way of making the sign of the cross.

Beginning in the 1630s, this manifested as in the Zealots of Piety, a group of high-profile clergymen who wanted to implement various liturgical reforms to the Russian Church. They disliked the Stoglav for its enabling of pre-Christian festivals and what they saw as a disordered liturgy. In 1652, after the death of Patriarch Joseph, whose tenure had marked a low point in the influence and power of the position, one of them, Nikon, was elected as his successor. The most significant schism in Russian history unfolded in the mid-17th century, when a series of reforms by the Patriarch Nikon to mend the divisions between the Russian Church and other branches of Eastern Orthodoxy prompted such controversy it led to decades of sectarian conflict known as the raskol. Controversy within the clergy boiled over into the Great Moscow Synod of 1666 to 1667, where the reforms were declared valid and the prior practice anathema, with the Stogalav being declared heretical for its role in further separating Russian Orthodox practice from other Eastern Orthodox branches. Despite this, Nikon was removed from patriarchal power; he had become wildly unpopular, even amongst those who backed his efforts, mostly owing to his abuse of power and internal politics. He was involved in power struggles with Tsar Alexis that culminated in him taking to a monastery in a tantrum in hopes to have the Tsar beg for his return in 1658; when Alexis did not fall for the bait, the Russian Church was leaderless for a decade, and Nikon was immediately scrutinized when he attempted to reestablish himself as if nothing had occurred a decade later.

Nevertheless, his reforms were endorsed by the men who had just stripped him of his power, and the dissidents, known as Old Believers, were condemned. The Old Believers did not take their loss lying down, and the Tsarist regime used the split to grow its control over ordinary Russians' lives to an unprecedented degree, prompting backlash from dissidents. Banditry, revolts, and mass self-immolations became common, with thousands committing suicide by fire while major uprisings occurred at the Solovetsky Monastery and Moscow. The Old Believers, many of whom came from the peasantry and monastic classes, viewed the Tsarist attempt to enforce the Nikonian reforms as an abuse of secular power, represented in the latter by the increasingly centralizing power of the state and by the former by the feudal system that backed the reforms. In its most radical form, many Old Believers associated the Nikonian reforms and the increasingly autocratic state with the Antichrist and saw them as signs of the coming apocalypse, with the year 1666 drawing comparisons to the number of the beast, while the Greek three fingered manner of making the cross that Nikon replaced the old Russian two fingered practice drawing comparisons to the mark of the beast. The Tsarist state did its best to crack down on the Old Believers, with many dissenters being executed and imprisoned.

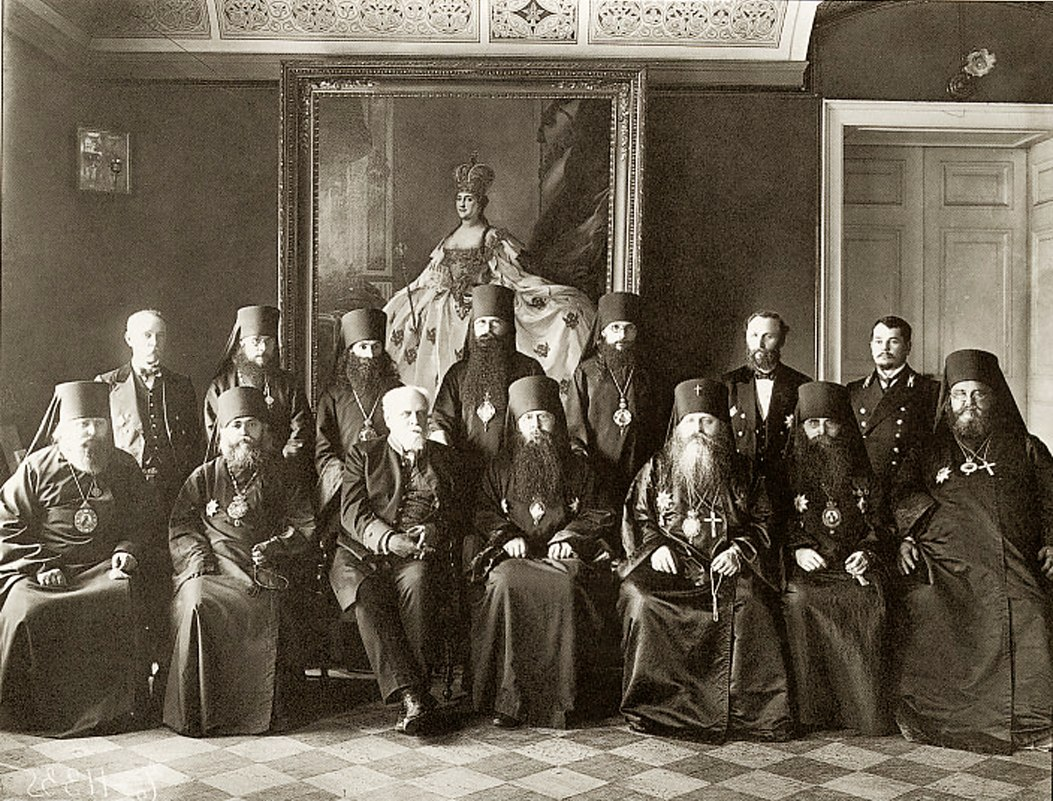
Participants of the July 26, 1911 extraordinary meeting of the Most Holy Synod

By the 1690s, the raskol began to subside as Peter the Great began concentrating his power. He did not care much for the religious divides and scaled back the persecution of the Old Believers, with them only being subjected to his formally unrelated Beard tax. The Old Believers would remain surprisingly durable, possibly (Note: The clandestine nature of the practice makes exact numbers difficult to calculate) accounting for up to 20% of Russia's population in the 19th century and having diaspora communities in areas like the United States and Canada. In Tsarist Russia, they began common amongst the merchantry and artisanry as their exclusion from the Orthodox establishment pushed them to commercial activity; additionally, their close-knit communities converted easily into business connections. Throughout the last years of the Russian Empire, restrictions on them were gradually whittled away.

Under Peter however, the Russian Church still went through a massive transformation, as Peter sought to consolidate even more control over it. After the death of Patriarch Adrian in 1700, the Tsar refused to appoint a new Patriarch, and in 1721, he formally abolished the office, replacing it with the Most Holy Synod, a governing body composed of laymen appointed by the Tsar and clergymen such as the Metropolitans of Saint Petersburg, Moscow and Kiev, and the Exarch of Kartvelia. The Chief Procurator of the Synod, a layman, effectively ran the Synod as a government ministry on behalf of the Tsar. As part of this, the Church lost what remained of its institutional independence and its check on the Tsarist state. As such, it increasingly became identified with the Russian state and oppressive strata system, a fact that helped contribute to the rapid secularization of Russian society in the Russian Empire's final years as the Tsarist model grew more and more unpopular, culminating in much of the outright anti-religious sentiment of the Revolutionary period. Although the Patriarchate was reestablished in the wake of the February Revolution in 1917, the Russian Orthodox Church by that point was a spiritually and intellectually depleted organization, compromised by its association with the Tsarist autocracy and unable to match the ferment and rigor of contemporary secular Russian thought.

== Non-Orthodox Christianity ==
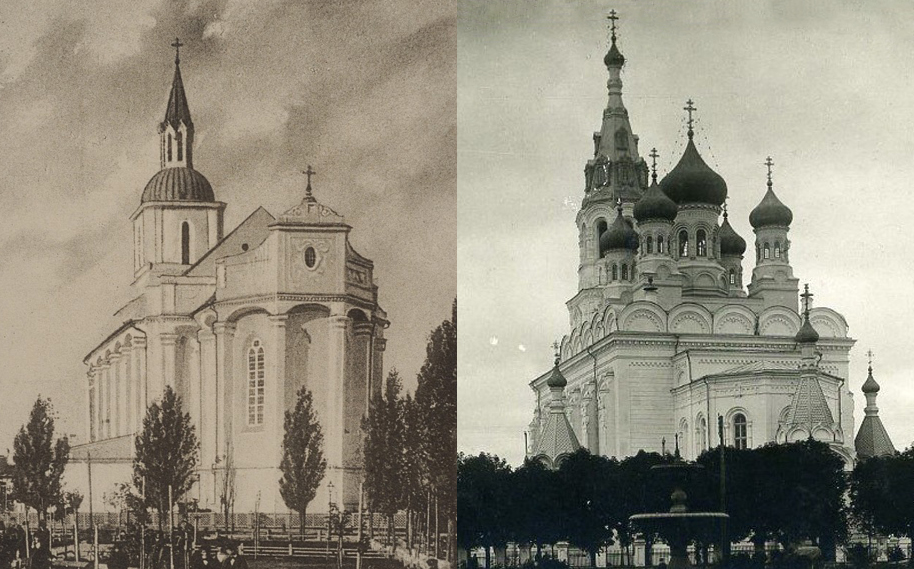
Two versions of the Church of the Blessed Virgin Mary in the Belarusian city of Grodno. Originally a Catholic church (old building pictured left), the Russian Orthodox Church seized it in 1804 and converted it. In the late 19th century, it was rebuilt in a pseudo-Russian style (pictured right).

Despite Tsarist Russia originating in the northern heartland of Eastern Orthodoxy, the expansion and circumstances of the state brought it into contact with other Christian denominations. Catholics were the largest non-Orthodox Christian group in the empire, almost wholly from the territories acquired from the collapse of the Commonwealth around the turn of the 19th century; Ruthenia (contemporary Ukraine and Belarus), Poland, and the southern Baltics. Russian policy towards Catholics oscillated depending on the political situation, largely being dependent on the relationship with subjugated Poland. Anti-Catholic oppression and sentiment ramped up following the failed Polish insurrections of 1830 and 1863, with Catholic education restricted, Catholic monasteries closed, and forced conversion efforts being implemented.

The Ruthenian Uniate Church established by the Union of Brest in 1596 was abolished under the Russian Empire. The Church had been created as a compromise by parts of the Ruthenian Orthodox populations of the PLC to transfer authority to the Pope while maintaining Eastern Orthodox liturgy. The Russians forcefully reintegrated them into the Orthodox mold in 1839, though they persisted afterwards, forming a major part of the Eastern Catholic Churches.

Protestantism was present in the Russian Empire through its northern Baltic and Finnish possessions, as a result of conversion efforts by the Swedes and local Baltic German population who had joined the Protestant Reformation. Alongside the Finns and Baltic Germans, the Latvians and Estonians were largely Lutheran. Oppression towards them was minimal, with the Baltic Germans enjoying a special status in the Russian Empire following the integration of the region in the 18th century. Despite surface-level similarities regarding qualms with the Catholics, the Russians never truly sought to ally with the Protestants, largely writing off the whole of Western Christianity as being fallen. In 1570 Ivan the Terrible invited an exiled Hussite, Jan Rokita, to make his case to him; Ivan strongly disagreed with his case and afterwards refused to even acknowledge the Protestants as Christians.

The last major non-Orthodox Christian group were the Armenians, whose national Apostolic Church would be present as a consequence of the Russian campaigns in the Caucasus during the 19th century. The Armenian Church maintained its autocephalous status, with the Catholicos of All Armenians residing at Etchmiadzin within Russian territory after 1828. More Armenian territory was ceded to Russia in the late 19th century as a consequence of the Russo-Turkish War of 1877–1878. Russia stylized itself as the protector of Christian minorities in the Ottoman Empire, with this being a big part of the decline of the Ottoman Empire; this extended to the non-Orthodox Christians largely living outside of the Ottomans' European possessions. The large Armenian population in the Ottoman Empire were included in this, especially as they began facing increased oppression as Turkish nationalism was picking up in the late 19th century; they subsequentially endorsed the idea of Russia being their protector. As part of a series of genocides against Christians in the Ottoman Empire's final years, tensions between the Turks and Armenians would blow over during World War I, where accusations of Armenian support of collaboration with the enemy Russians in the Caucasian front would be used as justification for the Armenian Genocide.

== Non-Christian faiths ==
The Mukhtarov Mosque in Baku c. 1910, as photographed by Sergey Prokudin-Gorsky

Islam emerged as the largest non-Christian faith in Tsarist Russia by the end of its existence, owing to the large Muslim populations on the Steppe and in Central Asia. They were present largely amongst the Turkic and Caucasian populations of the empire. Russian policy towards Islam varied throughout the Tsarist era; when Ivan the Terrible absorbed the Khanate of Kazan in 1552, they inherited the polity's large native Muslim populous; a similar scenario occurred in 1556 with his conquest of the Khanate of Astrakhan. attempts were made to incentivize and force conversion, such as the destruction of mosques and legal incentives towards baptism. Over time, especially during the imperial era, toleration increased. Under Catherine the Great, the Orenburg Muslim Spiritual Assembly was established in 1788; it served effectively as the Muslim version of the Holy Synod, used to organize and control the Islamic clergy. This practice was adopted in the Volga-Ural regions and was also largely imported to Central Asia following its conquest. The exception was the Caucasus. The Russian conquest of the Caucasus was fiercely opposed by the Muslim populations of the region and involved jihadi resistance through things such as the Caucasian Imamate; ultimately the Caucasian War would result in the brutal subjugation and Russification of the region, with the Circassians in particular undergoing exile and genocide after a century of war.

Jews, who grew to make up a large part of the empire, were subject to series of discriminatory regulations. Buddhism was also present in Tsarist Russia via the Mongols, specifically the Buryats and Kalmyks north of contemporary Mongolia and off the European coast of the Caspian Sea respectively. The Kalmyks migrated to the lower Volga steppe in the 17th century, settling in an area known today as Kalmykia; they subsequentially accepted Russian suzerainty. After conflicts with Russian settlers, many migrated back to Central Asia in the 18th century in a process that resulted in tens of thousands of them dying. Buryatia was incorporated by the Siberian conquest in the 17th century. Both maintained their variants of Tibetan Buddhism under state supervision. Many of the absorbed populations in Tsarist Russia, from the Turks, to Uralic peoples, to peoples of the Siberian far east and Alaska maintained pre-existing Tengrist and animist belief systems, often incorporating them into Christianity or Islam via syncretism; in more remote areas, they were able to continue practicing them well into the 20th century. Many were subject to conversion efforts by individual Russians or the state, such as the peoples of Russian Alaska.
