= Patriarch Pitirim of Moscow =

- Patriarch of Moscow and all the Rus'
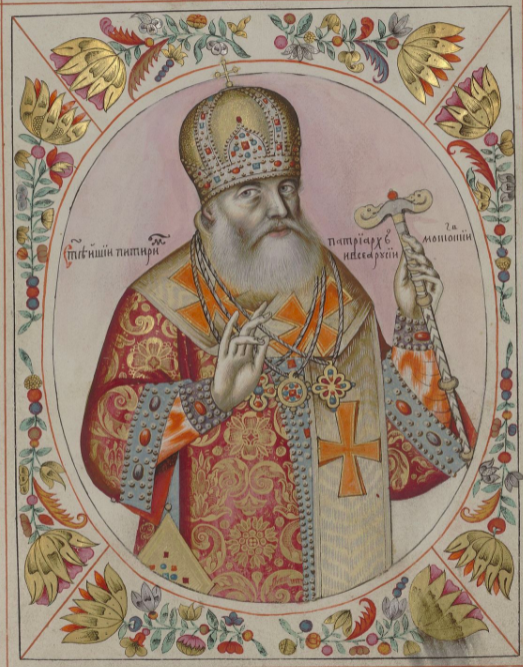
- Portrait in the Tsarsky titulyarnik, 1672
- Church: Russian Orthodox Church
- See: Moscow
- Installed: 1672
- Term ended: 1673
- Predecessor: Patriarch Joasaphus II of Moscow
- Successor: Patriarch Joachim of Moscow

Personal details
- Died: 19 April 1673

Pitirim of Krutitsy (Russian: Питирим Крутицкий; died April 1673) was the ninth Patriarch of Moscow and All Russia.

When Nikon held the post of patriarch, Pitirim was a metropolitan of Krutitsy. When Nikon willfully left the altar, Pitirim became his deputy and acted on his own as a real patriarch without even dealing with Nikon. When an ecumenical council gathered for hearing of Nikon's case, Pitirim was one of his most bitter opponents and accusers, probably, hoping to fill his post after his official deposition. Pitirim didn't succeed, however, because the council chose Joasaphus II over him. Only after the latter's death in 1672, Pitirim was appointed patriarch and remained on this post until his death a year later.

Prior to being named Metropolitan of Krutitsy, he had been Metropolitan of Novgorod for almost eight years (6 August 1664 – 7 July 1672).

== Footnotes ==
Eastern Orthodox Church titles
Preceded by Joasaphus II	Patriarch of Moscow; 1672–1673	Succeeded by Joachim
