= Sergey Miloradovich =

Russian artist (1851–1943)

Sergey Dmitrievich Miloradovich
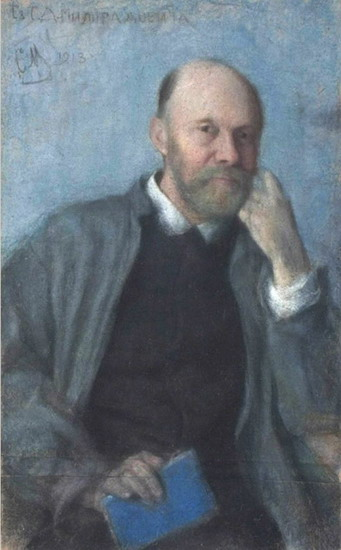
- Portrait by Sergey Malyutin
- Born: 16 July 1851; Russian Empire
- Died: 4 February 1943 (aged 91); Moscow, Soviet Union
- Education: Moscow School of Painting, Sculpture and Architecture
- Known for: Historical painting
- Notable work: Depictions of the Raskol
- Awards: Bronze medal, Exposition Universelle (1900); Fellow of the Imperial Academy of Arts

Sergey Dmitrievich Miloradovich (Russian: Серге́й Дми́триевич Милора́дович; 16 July [O.S. 4 July] 1851 – 4 February 1943) was a Russian painter of historical subjects.

The son of a rural cleric, Miloradovich attended a divinity school in Moscow and served for 25 years as a sexton in the parish of the Gonchary Resurrection Church. In the early 1870s he became interested in painting and enrolled at the Moscow School of Painting, Sculpture and Architecture where his teachers included such realist "itinerant" painters as Vasily Perov.

Miloradovich's paintings chronicle the history of the Russian Orthodox church with a special emphasis on the events of the 17th century, notably the Raskol. His works were shown at the major Peredvizhniki exhibitions from 1885 to 1923.

Miloradovich was awarded a bronze medal at the 1900 Exposition Universelle. He was named a fellow of the Imperial Academy of Arts nine years later.

After the October Revolution, Miloradovich's work was largely neglected. Little is known about his later years. He died in Moscow at the age of 91.

== Gallery ==
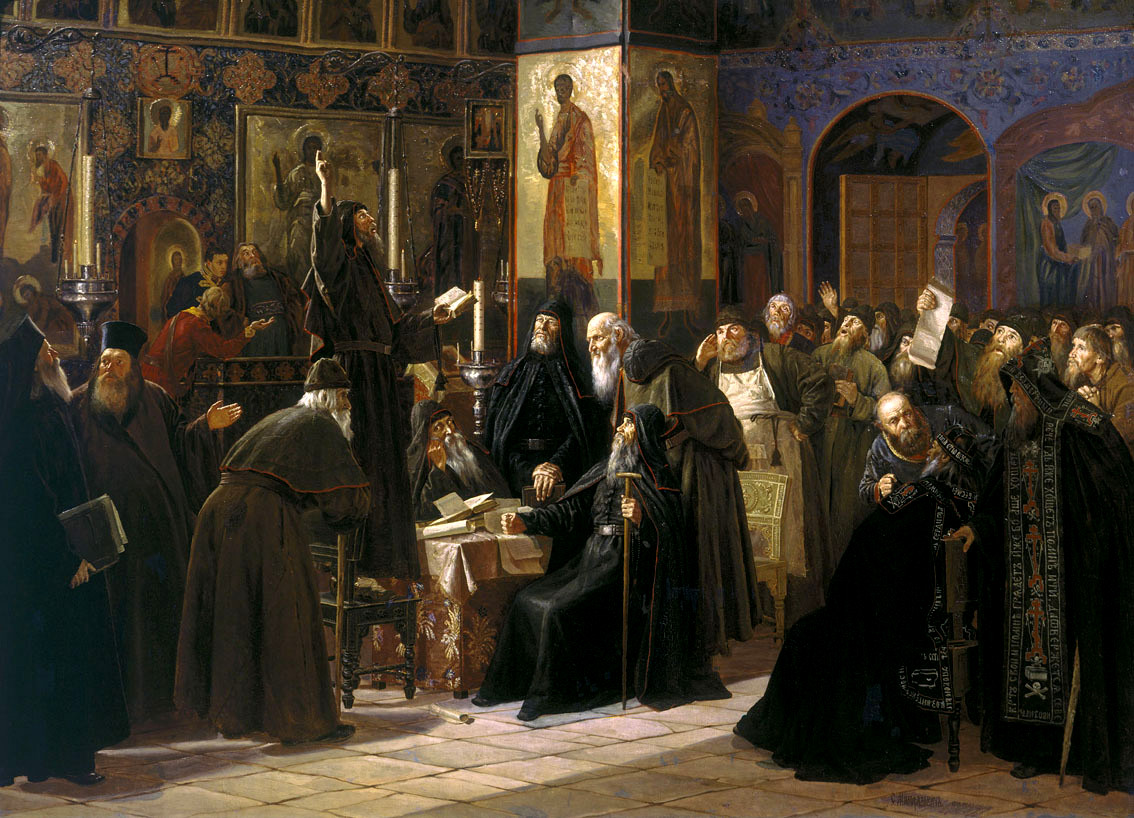
Solovetsky Monastery Uprising in 1666

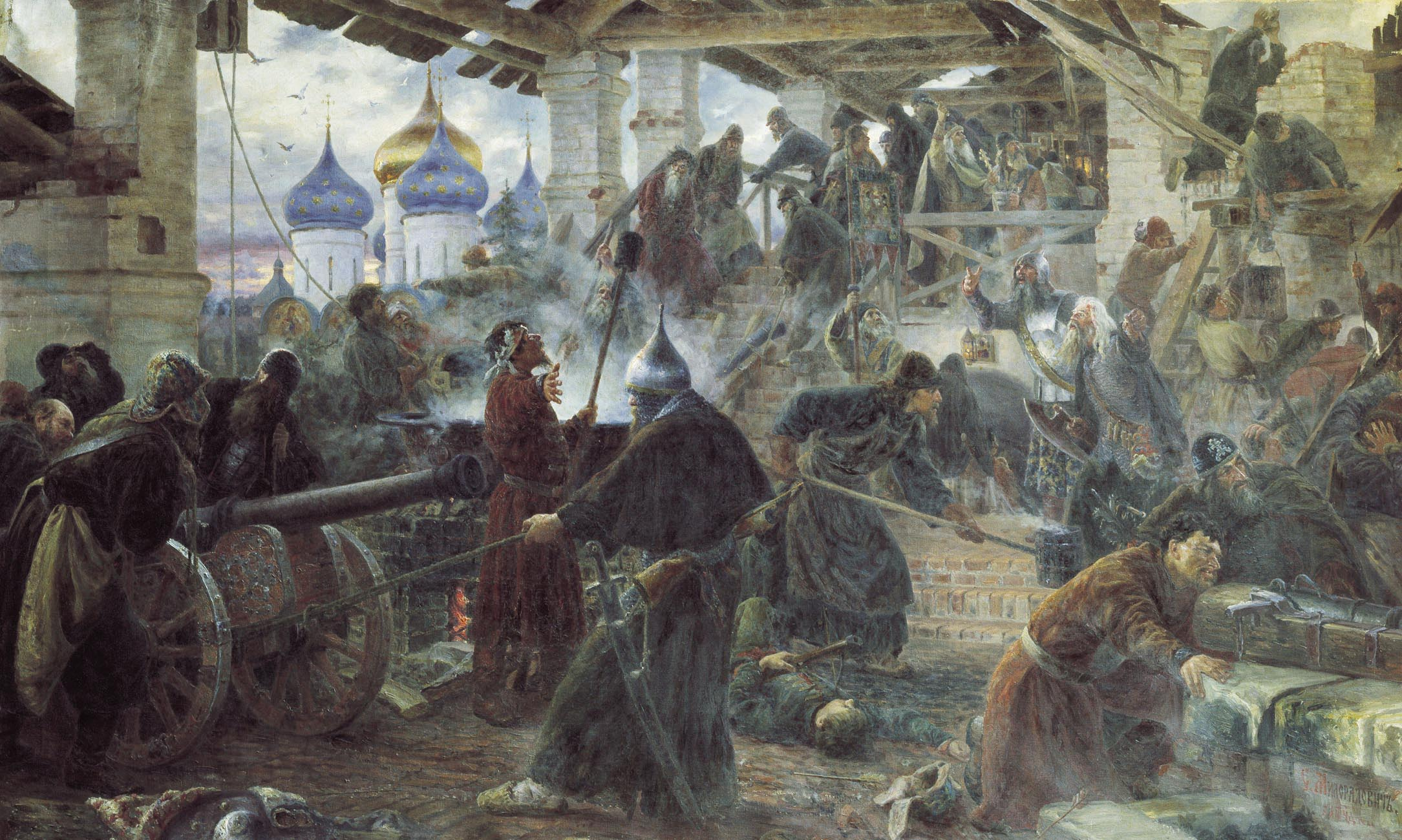
Defense of the Troitse-Sergiyeva Lavra against the Poles in 1610

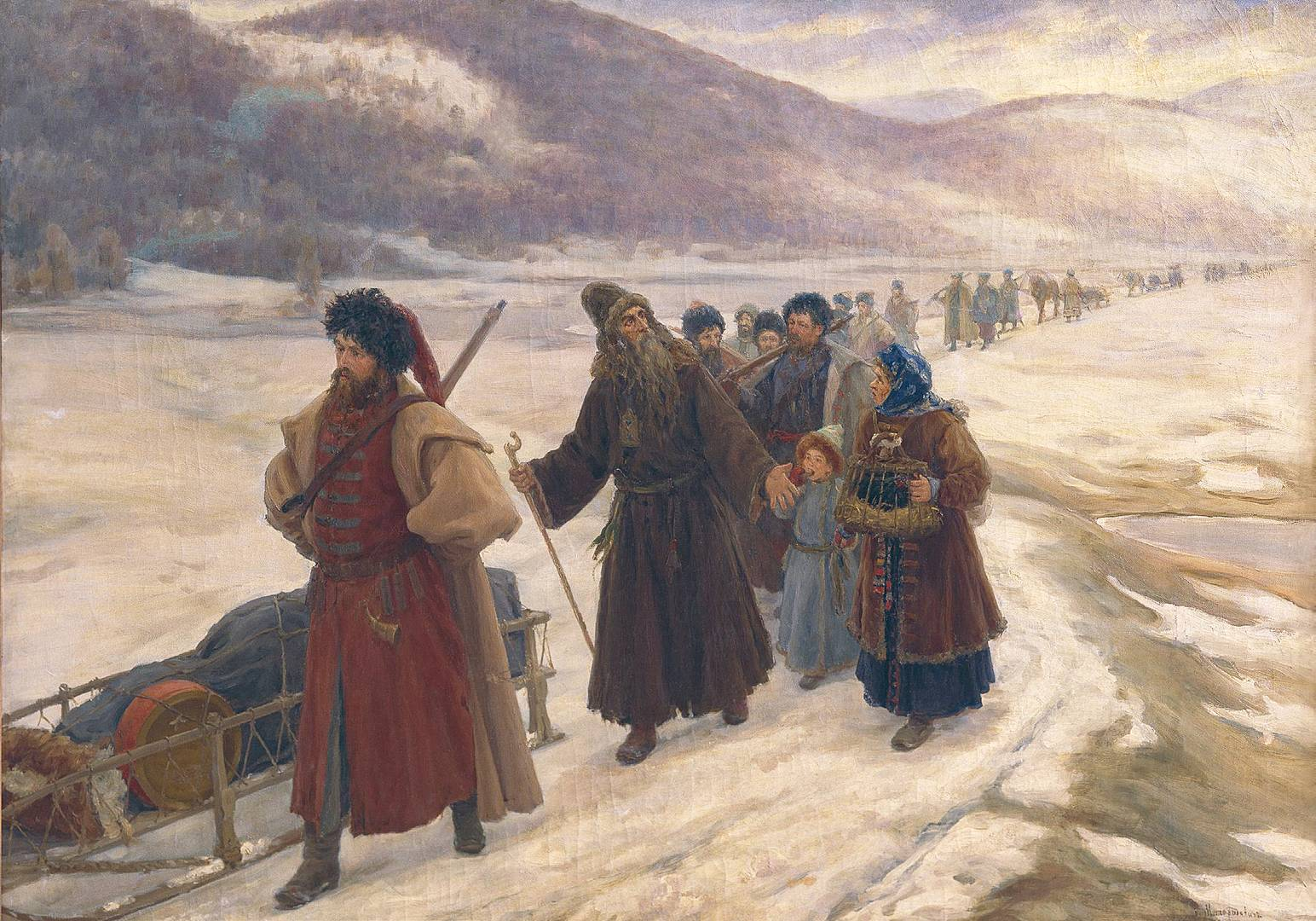
Avvakum in Siberia
