= Avvakum =

Russian protopope (1620/1621 – 1682)

Avvakum Petrov
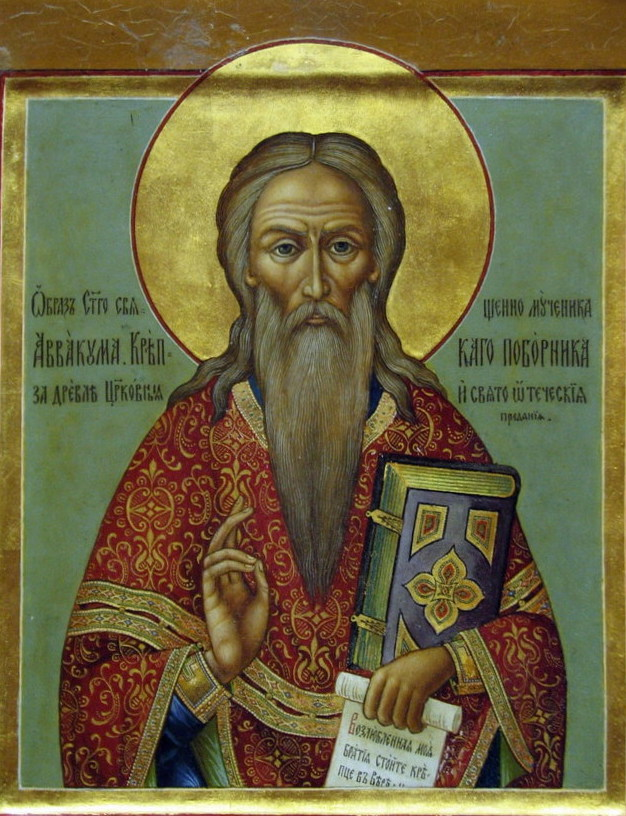

Great Martyr
- Born: 20 November 1620/21; Grigorovo, Nizhny Novgorod
- Died: 14 April 1682 (aged 60 or 61); Pustozyorsk
- Cause of death: Death by burning
- Venerated in: Old Believers (Russian Orthodox Old-Rite Church)
- Major shrine: Pustozyorsk, Russia
- Feast: Repose: 14 April
- Attributes: Dressed in a priest's robes, holding the two-fingered sign of the cross
- Patronage: Russia

Avvakum Petrov (Russian: Аввакум Петров; 20 November 1620/1621 – 14 April 1682; also spelled Awakum) was a Russian Old Believer and protopope of the Kazan Cathedral on Red Square who led the opposition to Patriarch Nikon's reforms of the Russian Orthodox Church. His autobiography and letters to the tsar and other Old Believers such as Feodosia Morozova are considered masterpieces of 17th-century Russian literature.

== Life and writings ==
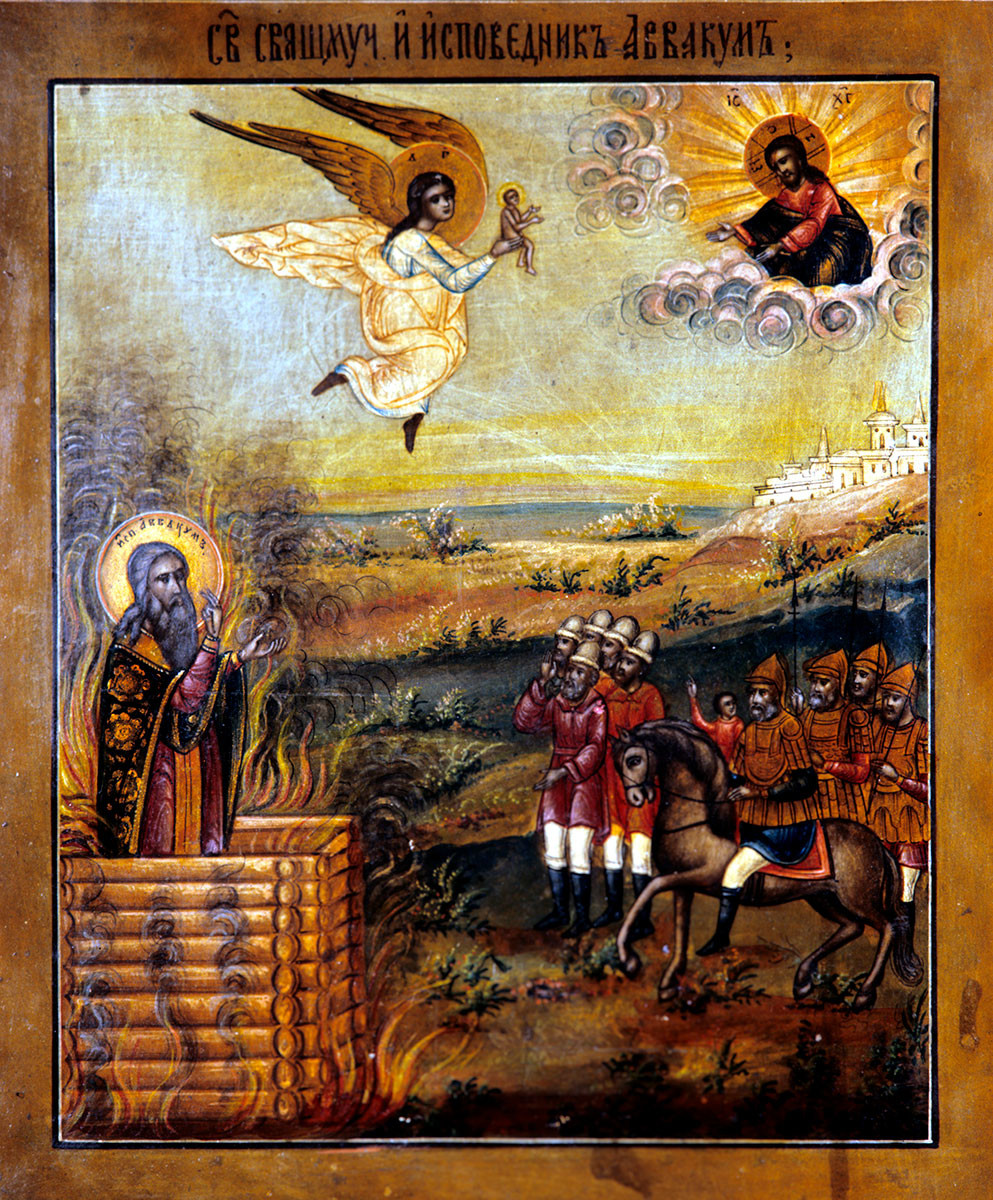
Burning of Archpriest Avvakum, Old Believer icon, late 17th to early 18th century)

He was born in Grigorovo, in present-day Nizhny Novgorod. Starting in 1652 Nikon, as the patriarch of the Russian Church, initiated a wide range of reforms in Russian liturgy and theology. These reforms were intended mostly to bring the Russian Church into line with the other Eastern Orthodox Churches of Eastern Europe and the Middle East.

Avvakum and others strongly rejected these changes. They saw them as a corruption of the Russian Church, which they considered to be the true Church of God. The other churches were more closely related to Constantinople in their liturgies. Avvakum argued that Constantinople fell to the Turks because of these heretical beliefs and practices.

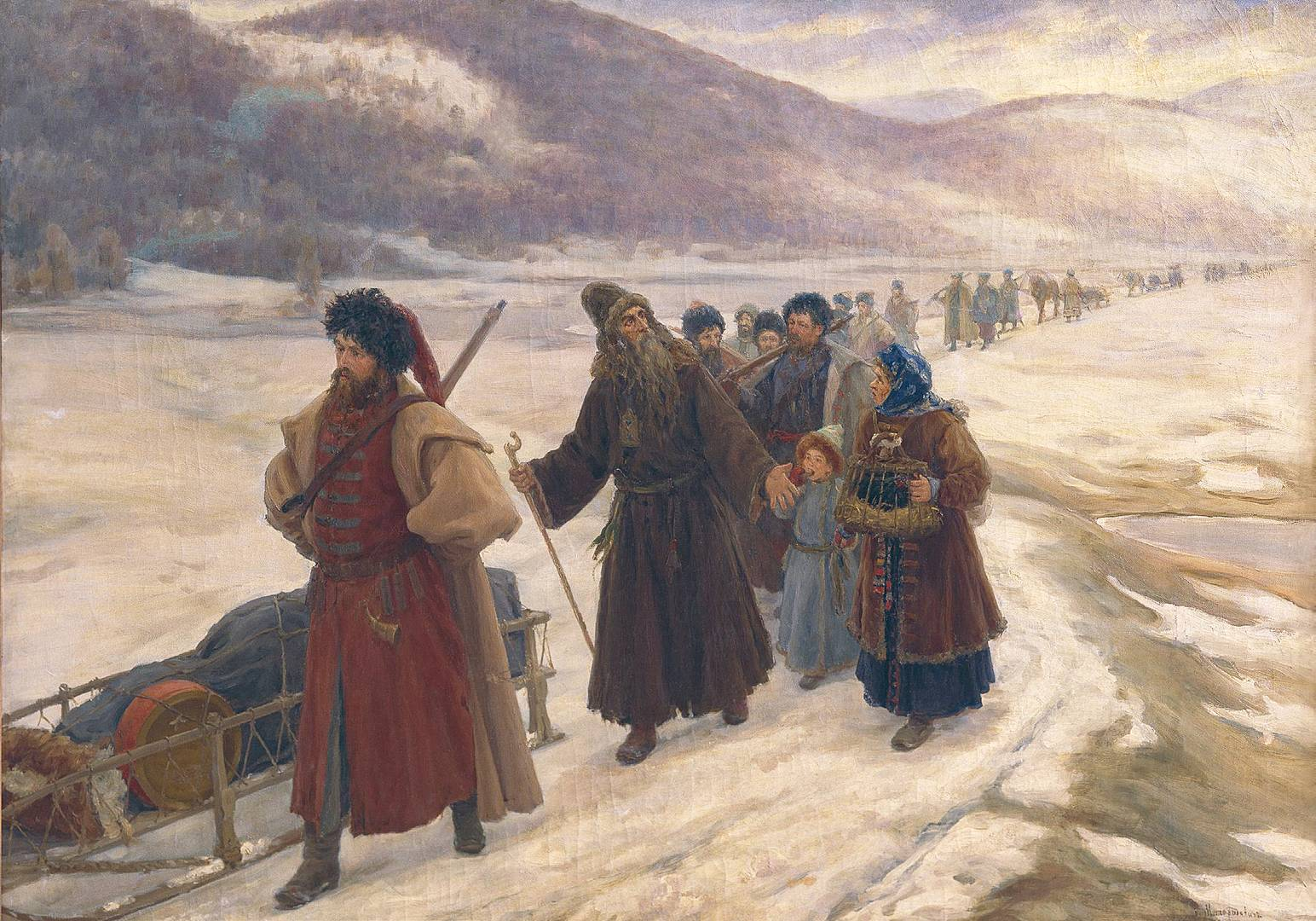
Avvakum's Exile in Siberia (1898), by Sergey Miloradovich

For his opposition to the reforms, Avvakum was repeatedly imprisoned. First he was exiled to Siberia, to the city of Tobolsk, and partook in an exploration expedition under Afanasii Pashkov to the Chinese border. In 1664, after Nikon was no longer patriarch, Avvakum was allowed to return to Moscow, and was then exiled again to Mezen. He was then allowed to return to Moscow again for the Church Council of 1666–67, but due to his continued opposition to the reforms, he was exiled to Pustozyorsk, above the Arctic Circle, in 1667. For the last fourteen years of his life, he was imprisoned there in a pit or dugout (a sunken, log-framed hut). He and his accomplices were finally executed by being burned in a log house. The spot where he was burned has been commemorated by an ornate wooden cross.

Avvakum's autobiography recounts hardships of his imprisonment and exile to the Russian Far East, the story of his friendship and fallout with Tsar Alexei Mikhailovich, his practice of exorcising demons and devils, and his boundless admiration for nature and other works of God. Numerous manuscript copies of the text circulated for nearly two centuries before it was first printed in 1861.

== The Life of the Archpriest Avvakum ==
The Life of the Archpriest Avvakum, originally titled The Life Written By Himself (Russian: Житие́ протопопа́ Авваку́ма, им сами́м напи́санное) is a hagiography and autobiography written by the Old Believer and protopope (archpriest) Avvakum Petrovich. The text discusses Avvakum's struggle against Patriarch Nikon's reforms during the Schism of the Russian Church and extensively details the trials he experienced during various exiles in Siberia. The text is remarkable for its style, which blends high Old Church Slavonic with low Russian vernacular and profanity. The Life is considered "one of medieval Russia's finest literary works" and was regarded highly by both Leo Tolstoy and Fyodor Dostoevsky.

=== Historical background ===
==== Schism of the Russian Church ====
In the 17th century, the Russian Church underwent significant reforms spearheaded by Patriarch Nikon and supported by Tsar Alexei Mikhailovich. The resulting split in the Russian Church between supporters of the reforms and their opponents, who came to be known as the Old Believers, is known as the Schism of the Russian Church.

Historian Georg Bernhard Michels writes that "the Russian Orthodox Church became a significant target of popular hostility during the second half of the seventeenth century." Having survived the destabilizing Time of Troubles, the Church had become a "powerful bureaucracy" by the 1630s. As the Time of Troubles was seen as a punishment for impiety, the Church was "intensely conservative" and "aspired to restore the 'ancient piety' in its fullness."

This drive for strengthening and purification was further influenced by the Ruthenian Orthodox revival led by Petro Mohyla in Kiev in the 1630s to 1640s, who likewise sought to strengthen Orthodox religiosity and spirituality in Ruthenia. In Kiev and Lviv, "Orthodox brotherhoods set up schools under the direct patronage of the patriarch of Constantinople."

In the late 1640s, Nikon and Avvakum were members of the Zealots of Piety (known also as bogolyubtsy, i.e. "lovers of God"), a circle of ecclesiastical and secular figures who aimed to improve religious and civilian life and to purify and strengthen the influence of the Russian Orthodox Church. Gradually, a split appeared in this circle: while certain Zealots echoed the sentiments of the Ruthenian revival, others, most notably Avvakum, "felt that homespun truths were sufficient and suspected foreigners of [cunning], which would adulterate the simple, strong native faith." When Nikon became the patriarch of Moscow and all Russia in 1652, he initiated ambitious reforms, entrusting "Jesuit-trained scholars from Ukraine and White Russia with a critical review of the forms of Russian worship." This exacerbated tensions with and among the Zealots, who "wanted to create a church which was morally pure and close to the ordinary Russian people".

Tsar Alexei and Patriarch Nikon, by contrast, had imperial aspirations. Nikon's vision of ecclesiastical restoration assumed the "continued dominance of the church over state" and stretched beyond Muscovy to the "entire Eastern Christian ecumene." Nikon's ambitions were further strengthened by his "contact with Greek and Ukrainian churchmen" and by Russian territorial gains in the Russo-Polish War of 1654–1667. After the Ruthenian revival, western Slavic Orthodox practices became closer to those of Greek Orthodoxy than to the Russian tradition, which had been increasingly isolated from the Greek Orthodox Church over the past several centuries. Nikon sought, likewise, to bring Russian church practice into line with Greek Orthodoxy. Russian linguist Alexander Komchatnov further emphasizes that that goal was in line with Muscovy's newly developed imperial aims, allowing Russia to position itself at the center of the whole Orthodox world instead of remaining a marginal religious entity.

From 1653 to 1656, Nikon's reforms changed the manner of making the sign of the cross (from the dvoeperstie, the two-fingered cross, to the troeperstie, the three-fingered cross), introduced new liturgical vestments modeled in the Greek style, and imposed a normalized revision of liturgical books.

Those opposing Nikon's reforms came to be known as the Old Believers. Their texts painted the Schism as an apocalyptic contest between good and evil, with Nikon as the Antichrist. They were continually repressed, arrested, and exiled from the onset of Nikon's reforms.

Nikon and Tsar Alexei soon fell out, and Nikon was placed in confinement, but the tsar continued to enforce his reforms. In 1666, the Great Moscow Synod summoned by Tsar Alexei anathematized all who refused to abide by Nikon's changes. A trial of the Zealots was held and leading Old Believers, Avvakum among them, were exiled beyond the Arctic Circle to Pustozersk on the Pechora River, in today's Nenets-Autonomous Okrug, 27 km from Naryan-Mar. The reforms and their enforcement prompted outright rebellions that continued over the next several decades.

==== Persecution of Avvakum and the Old Believers ====
In 1653, Avvakum and his family were exiled to Tobolsk, Siberia. In 1655, they were moved to Yeniseysk, from which Avvakum departed with A.F. Pashkov's expedition to Dauria on the Chinese border, traveling past Lake Baikal to Nerchinsk. In 1664, Avvakum returned to Tobolsk, remaining for two years before being permitted to return to Moscow in 1664. Several months later he was once more exiled with his family to Mezen. He was permitted to return to Moscow for the Great Moscow Synod of 1666-1667, but was finally exiled to Pustozersk alongside his fellow Old Believers Lazar, Fyodor, and Epifany. From 1670 onward, they were condemned to life "on bread and water" in a dugout, where they lived until they were burned alive on 14 April 1682. During his imprisonment, Avvakum wrote his autobiography; the first version of The Life was drafted in 1669–1672, and the subsequent three redactions from 1672 to 1675. The trials he suffered in his numerous exiles are largely the subject of this text.

=== Genre ===
Avvakum referred to his memoir as a hagiography (zhitie), which might suggest that he was characterizing himself as a saint, though he may have referred to it that way because, simply, no other word for what we would today call autobiography had yet been coined. D. S. Mirsky writes, "It is not an all-round autobiography: it was written for purposes of edification and propaganda. It is in essence an Apologia pro vita mea, not a disinterested exposition of all the facts of his life." Scholars such as Alan Wood consider The Life a prototype of Siberian prison literature, a tradition that would most famously be continued by Fyodor Dostoevsky (Notes from the House of the Dead) in the 19th century and Aleksandr Solzhenitsyn (The Gulag Archipelago) in the 20th.

=== Content ===
==== Early life ====
Avvakum's account largely follows his biography. He was born circa 1620 in Grigorevo in present-day Nizhny Novgorod Oblast to an alcoholic priest named Pyotr, who died while Avvakum was a child, and a nun, Maria. Avvakum married a merchant's daughter, Nastasya Markovna, at age 17, became a deacon at 21, a priest at 23, and an Archpriest in Yurevyets at 28. By his own account, Avvakum appears to be a passionate, faithful man, who was nonetheless often harsh and unforgiving in his religious zeal. Before the Nikonian reforms, he dealt harshly with harlequins (skomorokhi), lechery, and unbelievers. His zeal causes continuous conflicts with local boyars and officials. Eventually, Avvakum flees to Moscow, where he encounters Nikon as the latter is rising in prominence. The two are initially friends, but Nikon begins his reforms soon thereafter, forcing several dissenting members of the clergy to undergo shearings, markings, and exile. Avvakum himself is also seized, and is exiled with his family to Siberia.

==== Exile in Siberia and expedition to Dauria ====
Avvakum extensively describes his first exile to Tobolsk and his experience on the forced expedition to Dauria, led by Afanasy Pashkov. Pashkov orders that Avvakum be beaten, but Avvakum's prayer alleviates his pain. The travelers become so hungry that they eat a newborn foal, along with its blood and afterbirth, but two of Avvakum's sons eventually die. Amidst these trials, Avvakum heals the mad and the ill and urges them to repent.

Avvakum also denounces shamanism. In one episode, Pashkov sends his son Eremej to battle in Mongolian territory, but first asks a shaman to predict the outcome of the war. The shaman predicts victory. Avvakum is angered, knowing the shaman to be channeling devils, and prays for the demise of Pashkov's men. However, recalling the previous kindness of Eremej, he is overcome by pity, and asks the Lord to pardon him. Pashkov's men are decimated but Eremej is spared, and a vision of Avvakum appears to Eremej to lead him back home from the wilderness. Pashkov is nonetheless angry with Avvakum for his malignant prayers. Avvakum concludes his description of Pashkov's military expedition thus: "Ten years he tormented me, or I him — I don't know. It will be sorted out on Judgement Day." Avvakum also extensively describes the beauties and bounty of the land explored during the expedition to Dauria.

Avvakum describes saving a man by lying about his whereabouts. Avvakum asks whether, having lied, he has sinned and should seek penance. The narrative is then interrupted by words of absolution attributed to Avvakum's confessor, Epifany:

"God doth forgive and bless thee in this age and that to come, together why thy helpmate Anastasia and thy daughter, and all they house. Ye have acted rightly and justly. Amen."

==== Return to Moscow and imprisonment in Pustozersk ====
Returning from exile, Avvakum writes of being well received in Moscow by the boyars and the tsar, whom Avvakum describes charitably despite the oppression he himself faced. However, due to Avvakum's continued condemnation of the reforms, the tsar eventually exiles him once more, this time to Mezen, where Avvakum spends a year and half with his family. He is brought to Moscow again during the Great Moscow Synod of 1666–67, though this time he is received poorly and is imprisoned in Pafnut'yev monastery and in a cell in St. Nikola's. Avvakum publicly denounces the Nikonian reforms before the Eucemenical Council of Patriarchs. (92–93). After this, he and Lazar, Fyodor, and Epifany are banished to Pustozersk. During this time, many of Avvakum's followers are punished. Though Avvakum's fellows in Pustozersk are physically mutilated by their guards and their tongues, fingers, or hands cut off, God grants them all supernatural healing. Soon after, they are imprisoned in a dugout cabin.

==== Exorcisms of Devils ====
Avvakum concludes The Life with several accounts of exorcisms performed by him, culminating in the attempted exorcism of a woman in Tobolsk. During the protracted struggle between Avvakum and the devils who possess the woman, she dies for four days. When she wakes, she tells Avvakum she had been led by angels to a beautiful mansion which, they told her, belongs to Avvakum. Avvakum eventually heals her and she becomes a nun named Agafya. Avvakum ends by beseeching his confessor Epifany to write down his own life story, and to speak not for himself, but for the love of Christ.

=== Themes ===
==== Protest of Nikonian heresy ====
Avvakum describes the schism in apocalyptic terms: "God poured forth the vials of his wrath upon the kingdom! And still those poor souls didn't come to their senses, and kept right on stirring up the Church. Then Neronov spoke, and he told the tsar the three pestilences that come of the schism in the Church: the plague, the sword, and division." He writes of being mindful that his wife and children bear the punishment as a consequence of his dissent, but he also writes of his wife's insistence that he remain true to the faith. In response to his doubt, the Archpriestess Nastasya Markova hardens his resolve:

"Now stand up and preach the Word of God like you used to and don't grieve over us.... Now go on, get to the church, Petrovič, unmask the whoredom of heresy!" Well, sir, I bowed low to her for that, and shaking off the blindness of a heavy heart, I began to preach and teach the Word of God about the tows and everywhere, and yet again did I unmask the Nikonian heresy with boldness.

==== Endurance of physical violence ====
The Life is full of accounts of violent beatings and trials that Avvakum endures without resistance. This theme is further extended to Avvakum's endurance of his fate. Avvakum describes how, when his barge was swept away on the Khilok River, he expressed no bitterness: "Everything was smashed to bits! But what could be done if Christ and the most immaculate Mother of God deigned it so? I was laughing coming out of the water, but the people there were oh'ing and ah'ing as they hung my clothes around on bushes." An episode with Avvakum's wife Nastasya Markovna further emphasizes the theme of endurance:

The poor Archpriestess tottered and trudged along, and then she'd fall in a heap — fearful slippery it was! Once she was trudging along and she caved in, and another just as weary up into her and right there caved in himself. They were both shouting, but they couldn't get up. The peasant was shouting "Little mother, my Lady, forgive me!" But the Archpriestess was shouting, "Why'd you crush me, father?" I came up, and the poor dear started in on me, saying, "Will these sufferings go on a long time, Archpriest?" And I said, "Markovna, right up to our very death." And so she sighed and answered, "Good enough, Petrovič, then let's be getting on."

==== Holy and supernatural elements ====
Avvakum frequently relies on prayer and God's grace to survive the many trials he is put through and to conquer the forces he encounters. For instance, Avvakum and his family are saved from a storm on the Tunguska river by God's grace in response to his prayer.

In an episode in which he heals two madwomen, Avvakum describes at length how to drive the devil out of the body: "The devil's no peasant, he's not afraid of a club. He's afraid of the Cross of Christ, and of holy water, and of holy oil, and of plain cuts and runs before the Body of Christ." The madwomen are only rid of their madness when they live with Avvakum, becoming mad again the moment they are sent away. Avvakum is also able to sense the devils summoned by the shaman invited by Pashkov:

That evening this peasant sorcerer brought out a live ram close by my shelter and started over conjuring it, twisting it this way and that, and he twisted its head off and tossed it aside. Then he started galloping around and dancing and summoning devils, and after considerable shouting he slammed himself against the ground and foam ran out of his mouth. The devils were crushing him, but he asked of them, "Will the expedition be successful?" And the devils said, "You will come back with a greatly victory and with much wealth."

Avvakum also describes how once, during winter in Dauria, he had to travel across a great stretch of ice but fell from weariness and thirst. In his response to his prayer for water, God splintered and parted the ice, leaving him a small hole from which to drink. Avvakum draws a parallel between this episode and God's mercy to the Israelites wandering in the Sinai. In other instances, the holy fool Fyodor is chained but, "by God's will," the chains fall to pieces, and various others whose tongues are cut out miraculously grow new tongues.

==== Depiction of Siberian nature ====
Valerie Kivelson remarks that Avvakum's depictions of Siberia present an image of "excessive, luxuriant bounty." On the journey to Dauria, Avvakum writes of the extremes of nature that he encountered:

Around it mountains were high and the cliffs of rock, fearfully high; twenty-thousand versts and more I've dragged myself, and I've never seen their like anywhere. Along their summits are halls and turrets, gates and pillars, stone walls and courtyards, all made by God. Onions grow there and garlic, bigger than the Romanov onion and uncommonly sweet.

He writes that there is "no end of to the birds, geese and swans." He recounts the many different kinds of fish that live alongside seals and sea lions, commenting that the fish are so oily that "you can't cook them in a pan — there'd be nothing but fat left!"

Bruce T. Holl notes that Avvakum depicted Siberia both as hell and as heaven. In The Life, the horrific struggle against vast Siberian distances, the harsh cold and the ensuing hunger and thirst — which prompt hellish instances of eating infant foals and carrion — are interposed with rhapsodies waxing poetic about the beautiful Siberian landscape and the God-given bountiful excess it keeps as its treasure.

=== Style ===
Avvakum's The Life has been greatly valued for its unique style. Russian linguist Viktor Vinogradov observed that The Life uniquely combined two entirely different linguistic registers, mixing high literary language with low vernacular, colloquialisms, and profanity. Vinogradov further remarks that this mixture of linguistic forms is simultaneously present on the level of imagery, as Avvakum combines high, exalted imagery with the low, bodily, and material.

== Legacy ==
Despite his persecution and death, groups rejecting the liturgical changes persisted. They came to be referred to as Old Believers.

== English translations ==
- Archpriest Avvakum: The Life written by Himself. Trans. by Kenneth N. Brostrom. Michigan Slavic Publications, 1979. ISBN 0-930042-33-6. Reprint: Columbia University Press, 2021.
