= Patriarch Joachim of Moscow =

11th Patriarch of Moscow (1674–1690)

Joachim Иоаким
- Patriarch of Moscow and all the Rus'
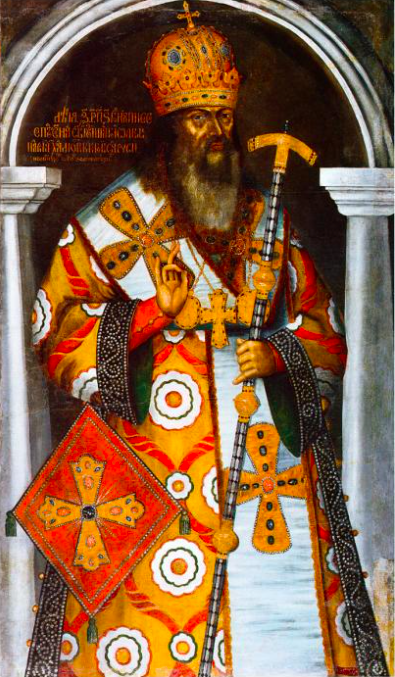
- Patriarch Joseph, portrait 1678
- Church: Russian Orthodox Church
- See: Moscow
- Predecessor: Pitirim
- Successor: Adrian

Personal details
- Born: January 6, 1620 Sibkovo, 10 km south-west of Mozhaysk, Russia
- Died: March 17, 1690 (aged 70)
- Buried: Dormition Cathadrel, Moscow Kremlin
- Profession: Civil Servant, Tsardom of Russia

Patriarch Joachim (Russian: Иоаким; January 6, 1620 – March 17, 1690) was the eleventh Patriarch of Moscow and All Russia, an opponent of the Raskol (the Old Believer schism), and a founder of the Slavic Greek Latin Academy.

Born Ivan Petrovich Savelov (Иван Петрович Савелов) also in some other sources as Ivan Petrovich Savyolov, Joachim was of noble origin. When his family died in the 1654 epidemic, he became a monk and served in various monasteries, including the Mezhyhirya Monastery near Kyiv. He received the religious name Joachim upon his tonsure.

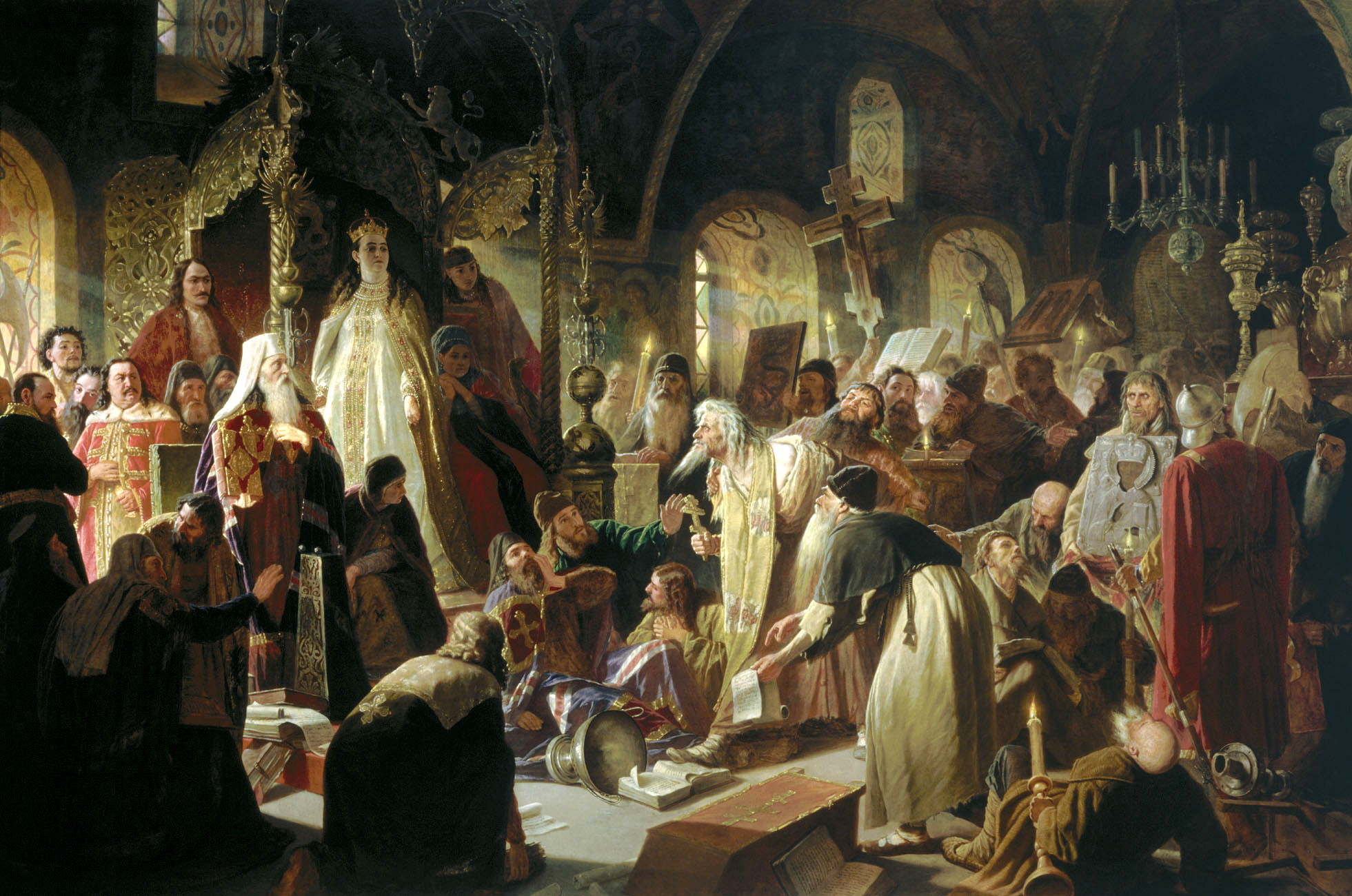
Old Believer Priest Nikita Pustosviat Disputing with Patriarch Joachim on Matters of Faith. Painting by Vasily Perov (1880).

In 1664, Joachim was elevated to the rank of archimandrite and became hegumen (abbot) of the Chudov Monastery and in 1672 was consecrated as Metropolitan of Novgorod. He was elected a Patriarch on July 26, 1674, following the death of Patriarch Pitirim. Although Joachim had participated in the council which deposed Patriarch Nikon, he continued Nikon's policies with regard to the Old Believers, and defending church authorities against the encroachments of Caesaropapism by the Tsars.

In 1686, he made an agreement with Bulgarian Rostislav Stratimirovic to aid in a revolt against the Ottomans. Patriarch Joachim also participated in, and directly supported the transfer of the Jurisdiction of the Metropolitanate of Kyiv from the Patriarchate of Constantinople to the Patriarchate of Moscow.

== Works ==
- Увет духовный
- Слово поучительное

Eastern Orthodox Church titles
Preceded by Pitirim	Patriarch of Moscow; 1674–1690	Succeeded by Adrian
