= Nikita Pustosvyat =

Russian priest (died 1683)

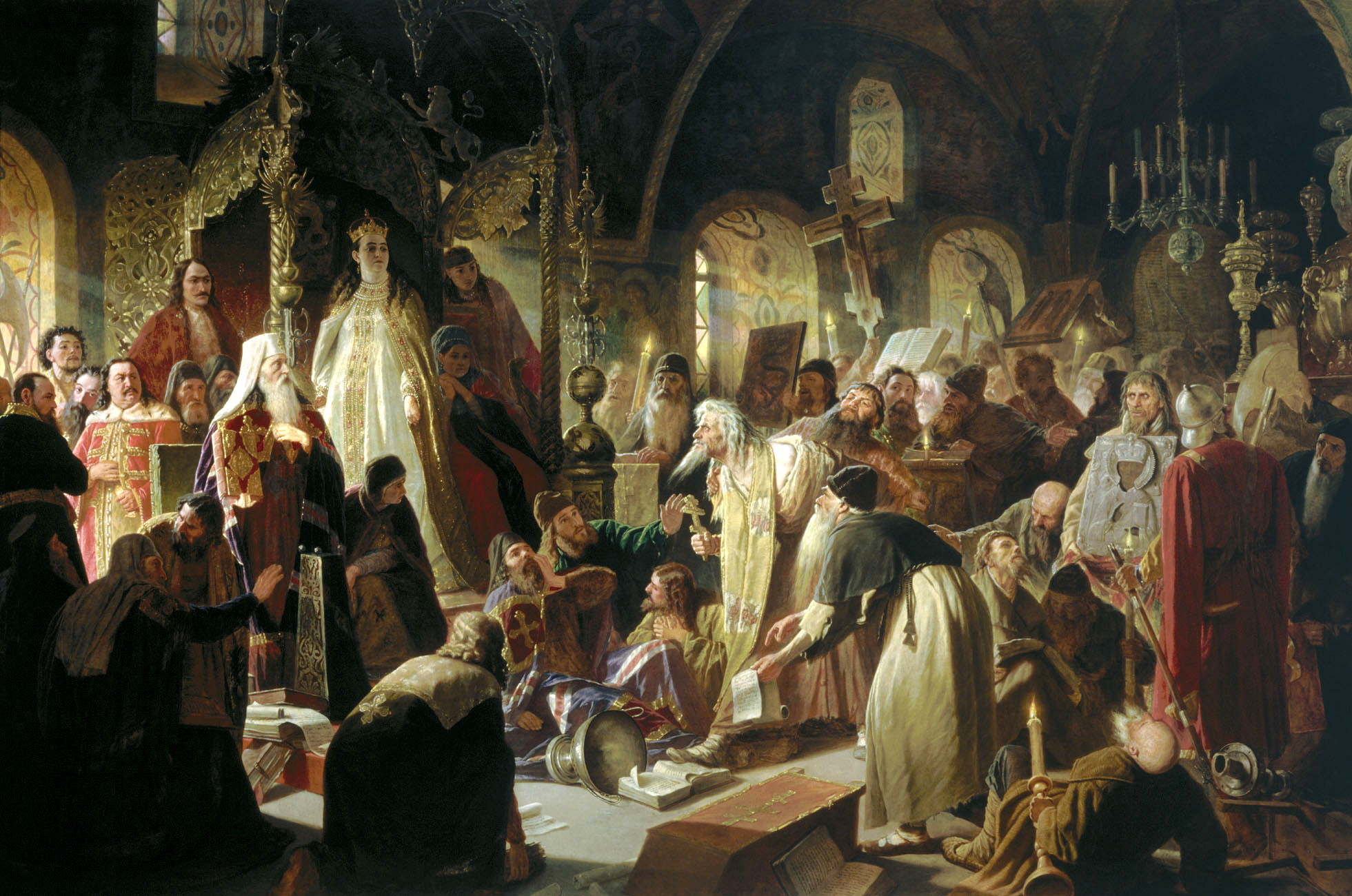
Old Believer Priest Nikita Pustosvyat Disputing with Patriarch Joachim on Matters of Faith by Vasiliy Perov, 1880-81.

Nikita Pustosvyat (Russian: Никита Пустосвят, real name Nikita Konstantinovich Dobrynin (Никита Константинович Добрынин); died June 11, 1683) was one of the leaders of the Russian Old Believers during Raskol.

== Life ==
The year of his birth is unknown. He was posthumously dubbed Pustosvyat ("Sanctimonious") by Patriarch Joachim after his execution. Nikita was a priest in Suzdal and participated in editing of church books under Patriarch Joseph.

In 1659, Nikita arrived to Moscow and lodged a complaint about Stefan, Archbishop of Suzdal, accusing him of digression from Orthodoxy. When Stefan was acquitted, Nikita denounced him to Tsar Aleksey Mikhaylovich.

The church council of 1666–1667 found him guilty and expelled him from the priesthood. The supporters of the old faith played an important role in the Moscow uprising of 1682, and the Old Believers gained support among the streltsy ('praetorian guard'). Pustosvyat achieved a July 5, 1682 church debate in the presence of the tsar. The debate, however, ended in vain for him. The streltsy betrayed Nikita, who was subsequently beheaded.
