= Patriarch Joasaphus II of Moscow =

- Patriarch of Moscow and all Rus'
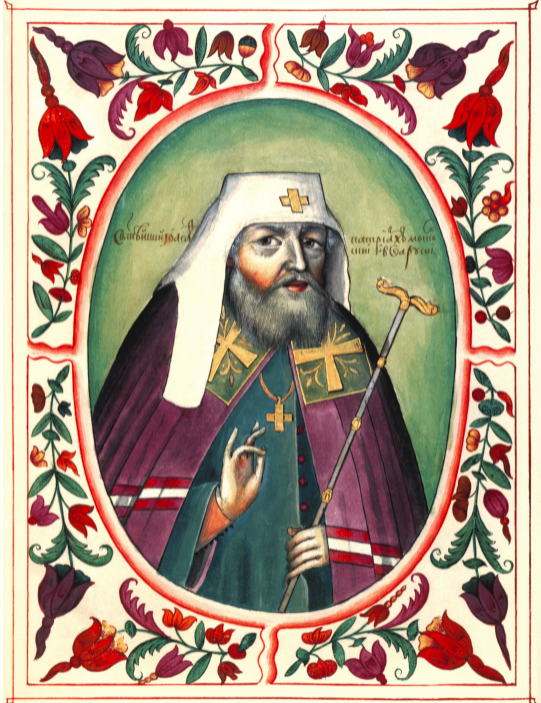
- Portrait in the Tsarsky titulyarnik, 1672
- Church: Russian Orthodox Church
- See: Moscow
- Installed: 1667
- Term ended: 1672
- Predecessor: Patriarch Nikon of Moscow
- Successor: Patriarch Pitirim of Moscow

Personal details
- Born: 1591
- Died: 11 February 1672 (aged 80–81)
- Buried: Moscow

Joasaph II (Russian: Иоасаф II (Новоторжец), Joasaph of Novy Torg) was Patriarch of Moscow and all Rus' from 1667 until his death five years and one day later in 1672.

Joasaph was archimandrite of the Rozhdestvenskii (Nativity) Monastery in Vladimir from 1654 to April 25, 1656, when he was named archimandrite of the Trinity-St. Sergius Lavra. In 1666, he was a member of the court that tried Patriarch Nikon and deposed him, although it also approved his reforms that had led to the Old Believer Schism.

On February 10, 1667, Joasaph was elected patriarch. He died February 11, 1672, and is buried in the Dormition Cathedral in the Moscow Kremlin.

== Literature ==
- Тарасова, Наталья (2022). "Новоторжец. К 350-летию со дня кончины Патриарха Иоасафа II" (PDF). Journal of the Moscow Patriarchate (in Russian) (2): 82–89.
- Макарий (Веретенников) (2024). Всероссийский Патриарх Иоасаф II. Троицкий настоятель на Первосвятительском престоле (in Russian). Sergiev Posad: Свято-Троицкая Сергиева Лавра. ISBN 978-5-00009-292-7.

Eastern Orthodox Church titles
Preceded by Nikon	Patriarch of Moscow; 1667–1672	Succeeded by Pitirim
