= Schism of the Russian Church =

1650s–60s Russian Orthodox schism

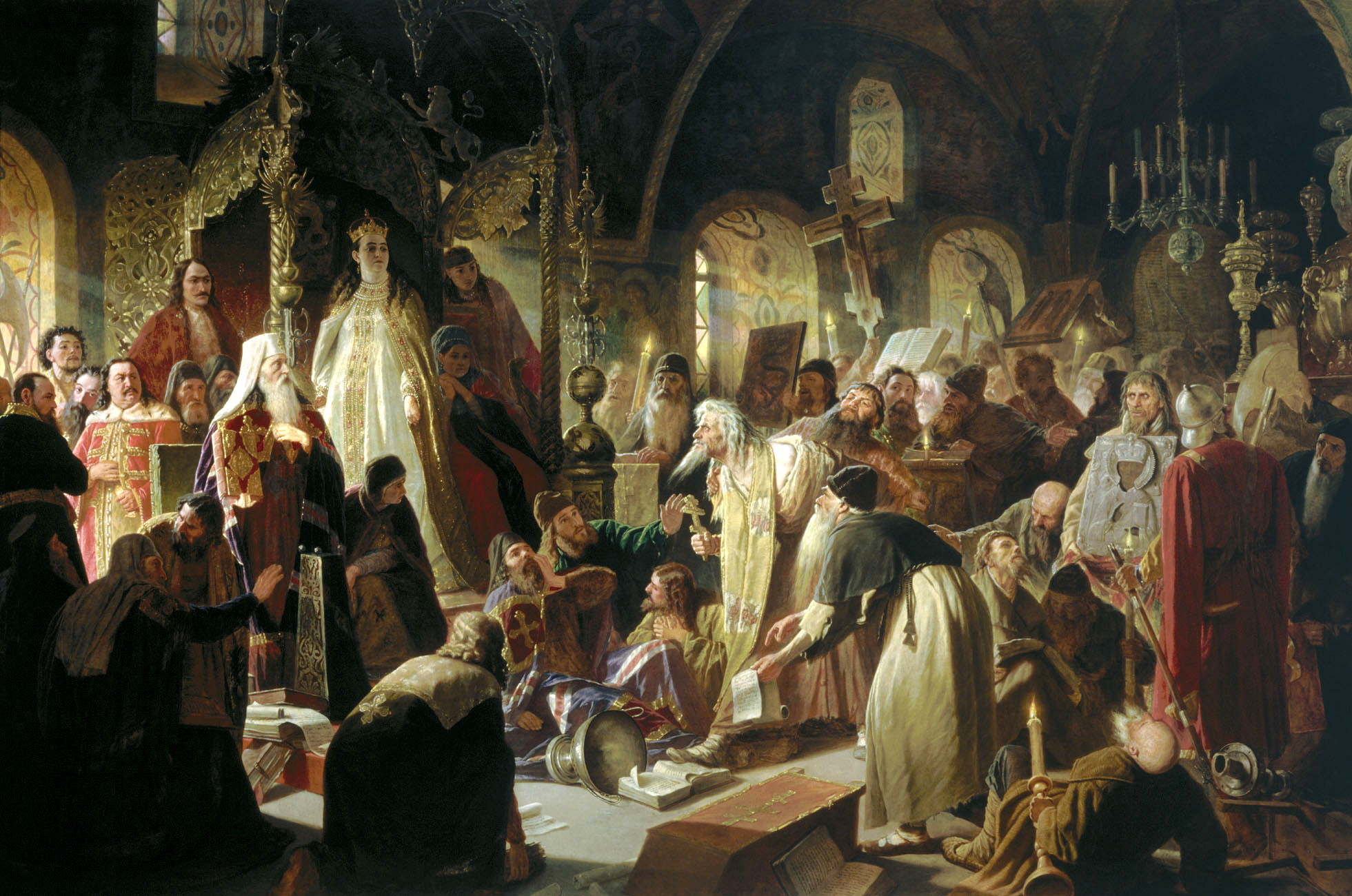
Dissenter Nikita Pustosvyat in a disputation with Patriarch Joachim. Painting by Vasily Perov.

The Schism of the Russian Church, also known as raskol (Russian: раскол, pronounced [rɐˈskoɫ], meaning 'schism'), was an era of religious and social turmoil in Russia spanning from the late 1660s to the early 1690s, during which dissenters opposing the authority of the Russian Orthodox Church appeared in great numbers, and were persecuted and suppressed by the ecclesiastical hierarchy and secular government.

The schism followed the liturgical and ritual reforms enacted by Patriarch Nikon at the behest of Tsar Alexis from 1652 to 1657, which aimed to remove all difference between the Russian rite and that of the Greek Orthodox Church, from which Christianity was imported to the nation. Both the Tsar and the Patriarch were convinced that local practices diverged from the Greek ones due to faulty transmission and scribal errors throughout centuries of Russian parochialism. Nikon's reforms engendered opposition from within the church in defense of traditional custom, voiced first by relatively minor figures such as priest Ivan Neronov, but later augmented by leading clergymen headed by Bishop Alexander of Vyatka and Archimandrite Spiridon Potemkin. Tsar Alexis attempted to reconcile the controversy by convening the 1666-1667 Great Moscow Synod, where the old rite was anathemized and declared heretical, and the reformed rite was proclaimed universally binding.

As the state proceeded to enforce the resolutions, and in fact to extend its authority over the people's life to an unprecedented degree, it clashed with local autonomies and popular folk religions, provoking recalcitrance and resistance. Ecclesiastical hierarchs interpreted these complex and manifold reactions as deriving from a single coordinated heretical movement, which they termed as "the Schism", and set out to destroy and suppress. Draconian persecution of anything deemed "schismatic", combined with social grievances in the face of tightening state bureaucracy, traditionalist opposition to the reforms, and apocalyptic fervor which gripped the land in anticipation of the End of Days by 1666, led to massive religious dissent, social unrest, armed banditry, full-blown revolts and mass-suicide by self-immolation, through which many thousands perished in flames. The most extreme episodes of the Schism were the Siege of the Solovetsky Monastery between 1668 and 1676, and the Moscow uprising of 1682. By the 1690s, the turbulence gradually waned, as Peter the Great relaxed the persecution of nonconformists, and the apocalyptic zeal diminished as the world evidently did not end. In the following decades, the surviving dissenter communities mostly evolved into the Old Believers, a loose movement defined by rejection of Nikon's reforms, but also to more radical sectarians like the Khlysts (flagellants).

== Prelude: 1441–1598 ==
Since the 15th century, the Russian Orthodox Church had a cardinal role in defining the coalescing Muscovite collective identity, newly emerging after the overthrow of the Tatar Yoke. In 1439, spurned by the Byzantine Emperor who desperately required European assistance against the Turks, all but one of the Greek Orthodox bishops present at the Council of Florence acceded to a reunion with the Roman Pontiff. Though the union was later repudiated by the people of Constantinople and many of the priesthood, the news of it shocked the Russians, who regarded the act as a corruption of the Byzantine Mother Church and a capitulation to the heretical and despised Catholics. In 1441, Prince Vasily II imprisoned Metropolitan Isidore, who supported the union, and in 1448 the Russian bishops elected Jonah in his stead, making the Muscovite Church de facto autocephalous and producing a schism with the Greeks. In 1453, Constantinople fell to the Turks, and the disaster was perceived in Russia as a divine punishment vindicating its stance. The Greek-speaking Orthodox were now under Muslim or Catholic rule, and Muscovy remained the only independent Orthodox power.

A sense of superiority and election permeated Russia following the downfall of the Second Rome. Before, the nation generally followed the Greek-speaking church, from which it received the faith in the 9th century: In the 14th century, after Byzantium adopted the Sabbaite typicon in place of the Studite, the Russians did the same within a century. But after 1453, the Greeks were no longer considered as necessarily reliable teachers, but as contaminated by foreign influence, reviled in the xenophobic and deeply religious Muscovy, priding itself on its strict isolation from the outside world. Russian Christianity was now espoused as the only true remaining form of Orthodoxy, untainted and uncorrupted. Learned churchmen ascribed to their nation the titles of "New Rome", "New Israel", and "New Jerusalem". Elder Philotheus of Pskov was most prominent in formulating this position, stating in 1523 that Moscow was the third and last Rome before the End Times, the guardian of authentic Christianity destined to rule the earth.

As scripture and the service books were originally translated from Greek, and Muscovy was intellectually backward and lacking in scholarship, Russian parochialism was plagued by self-contradiction from the start. Most of the patristic literature remained untranslated, beyond the reach of Muscovite churchmen. Greek scholars were ever required to gain access to the tradition which Russia claimed to be the sole possessor. In 1518 the learned monk Maxim the Greek was summoned to Moscow to aid in the translation of several sacred works from his language to Slavonic, and to corrigate the liturgical manuscripts – not for the last time, the ecclesiastical hierarchy became aware that poor scribal transmission and lack of systematic conventions resulted in inconsistencies between the extant texts, and even to what it deemed as heresies that entered them. Maxim attempted to introduce uniform rules on transcription and grammar. In 1525, he was tried for heresy, accused among other crimes of corrupting the prayer books. Apart from getting involved in internal church conflicts, Maxim's downfall was precipitated also because Russian clerics could not accept a foreigner tampering with their sacred traditions.

== Earlier reforms ==
At the beginning of the 1600s, the Orthodox Church in Russia was threatened by a period of political crisis known as the Time of Troubles. In 1598, Tsar Feodor I died without an heir, leaving Russia in a state of apparent lawlessness until the ascension of Tsar Michael I in 1613. During this time, the position of the Orthodox Church was twice imperiled. First, the usurper False Dmitry I was crowned tsar in 1605 and converted to Catholicism before being assassinated during an uprising in 1606, and later Moscow was occupied from 1610 to 1612 by the Catholic Polish–Lithuanian Commonwealth during the Polish–Russian War. These dangers to the Orthodox Church, and the entire period of violent instability, aroused a renewal of religious fervor among some Russians who perceived the events as divine retribution for a lack of devotion.

This heightened religiosity was materialized in the Zealots of Piety, a renewal movement aimed at reforming liturgy and embracing piety. The movement's early members included the Archbishop of Novgorod Nikon and Archpriests Ivan Nerov, Stephen Vonifatiev, and Avvakum, with secular support from Tsar Alexei Mikhailovich and his supporters Fyodor Rtishchev and Boris Morozov. In the 1630s and 1640s, during the reign of Patriarch of Moscow Joseph, the Zealots of Piety were concerned primarily with reforming a disordered liturgy and suppressing impious pre-Christian festivals, issues which had been prominent since the Stoglav Sobor of 1551. In 1636, Nerov and other priests sent a petition to the Patriarch from Nizhny Novgorod requesting aid in reforming "liturgical shortcuts". Complaints included the use of mnogoglosie (Russian: многоголосие lit. 'polyphony'), the practice of chanting multiple parts of the services at the same time, singing evening vespers in the morning, and omitting parts of the service altogether. The Patriarch responded by ordering parish clergy to prohibit such behavior. The petition further cited the observance among villagers of pre-Christian festivals such as Koliada, to which Tsar Alexei responded by decreeing a ban on the pagan entertainment.

Joseph's reign as Patriarch of Moscow was marked by a decline of the political power of the position. During the reign of the previous Patriarch, Filaret of Moscow, from 1619 to 1633, the Patriarch served as de jure ruler of the church and had a powerful influence on the state. In contrast, Joseph was unable to intercede in public affairs, and the state began to interfere in ecclesiastical affairs. In 1652, Joseph died. Many members of the Zealots of Piety urged Tsar Alexei to appoint Stephen Vonifatiev to the position, as he was the movement's informal leader, but the Tsar instead appointed Nikon to the seat, as Nikon had been the Tsar's spiritual advisor and close companion since 1646. Nikon was a Volga Finn born to a peasant family, and his harsh upbringing meant he took an uncompromising stance as Patriarch and reformer.

== Nikon's reforms ==
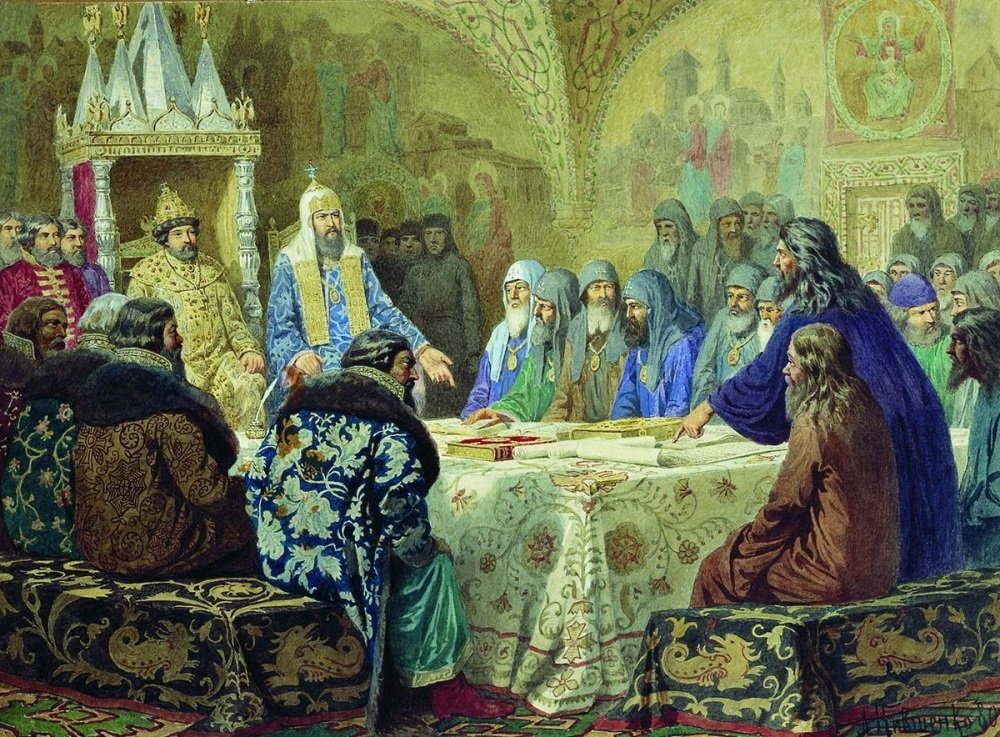
Patriarch Nikon (left) leads the revision of the church service books, with Tsar Alexei seated on the throne. Nikon's reforms were the catalyst for the church schism. Painting by Aleksey Kivshenko.

In 1653, with support from the Tsar, Patriarch Nikon began the process of changing the Russian divine service books to align with their contemporary Greek counterparts and changed certain liturgical rituals. Nikon's reforms of the service books were performed on the advice of Ukrainian and Greek monks and advisors. The former were a more learned and reactionary group than native Muscovite priests, having adapted Catholic Counter-Reformation rhetoric to the defense of the Orthodox Church, while the latter had an obvious bias in favor of the Greek rite. Among liturgical rituals, the most controversial changes included replacing the two-finger sign of the cross by one with three fingers and pronouncing "hallelujah" three times instead of two. These new reforms met with resistance from both the clergy and the people, who disputed the legitimacy and correctness of these reforms. Avvakum and other clergymen called Nikon a heretic, and the boyars saw Nikon's reforms and the renewal of the Patriarch's political power as a challenge to their own influence on the state.

The major claim made by Nikon's opposition was that the Russian pre-reform faith more closely adhered to the practices of the early church, since the fall of Constantinople had corrupted the Greek rite while Russians had preserved the church. This idea of the Moscow patriarchy as uncorrupted meant that observance of the Greek practices was apostasy. This tension between reformation and preservation of texts had been an issue in the Russian Church long before Nikon, as the Zealots of Piety and other reformers understood that consistent texts were necessary for consistent worship. However, while the conservative Zealots viewed the original Muscovite texts as inviolable and sacred, and viewed the reformation as a process of consolidating a preserved faith, Nikon was convinced by his advisors that the Russian practices were in error compared to the unalloyed Greek rite. Nikon was following the guidance of the 1593 Council of Constantinople, which required the adherence of the newly created Moscow Patriarchate to the Greek rite, while opponents of the reforms protested that the "correct" Greek books had been printed in Venetian, Catholic print houses for the Greek church of the Islamic Ottoman Empire. Since Nikon's reforms held that not only the service books but the liturgical practices of the pre-reform rite were heretical, he implied that pre-reform saints were also in error, a point often brought up by opponents of the reforms.

A traditional view of Nikon's reforms is that they only affected the external ritualistic side of the Russian Orthodox faith and that the Schism concerned only fanatics who superstitiously clung to pre-reform Russian customs. However, these reforms alienated the largely illiterate peasantry, for whom rituals such as the sign of the cross were inseparable from orthodox doctrine. Furthermore, the reforms established radically different relations between the church and the faithful. Nikon used his reforms for the purpose of centralization of the church and strengthening of his own authority; for example, Nikon would seize land and use the Russian Church's wealth to found his own monastic ventures such as the New Jerusalem Monastery. The earlier reforms of the Zealots of Piety were aimed at consolidating the power of priests in their own parish in order to combat local disorder, but the Nikonian reforms were aimed at consolidating the Patriarch's control over the parishes. These offenses alienated the Tsar, first leading to Nikon's flight from Moscow to one of his monasteries and later to Nikon's deposition at the Great Moscow Synod of 1666, a council convened by the Tsar himself. The official reason for the gathering was to try Nikon for dereliction of duty during his absence from Moscow, but as part of its proceedings the council also declared the Stoglav Sobor of 1551 heretical, as it had dogmatized pre-reform Russian practices such as the two-finger sign of the cross, which was unacceptable under the Greek rite. The council was the consummation of the Nikonian reformation crisis, and marked the beginning of the Old Believer movement, as it was at this synod that Avvakum and other Old Believer priests were finally anathematized and exiled.

== Uprisings and persecution ==
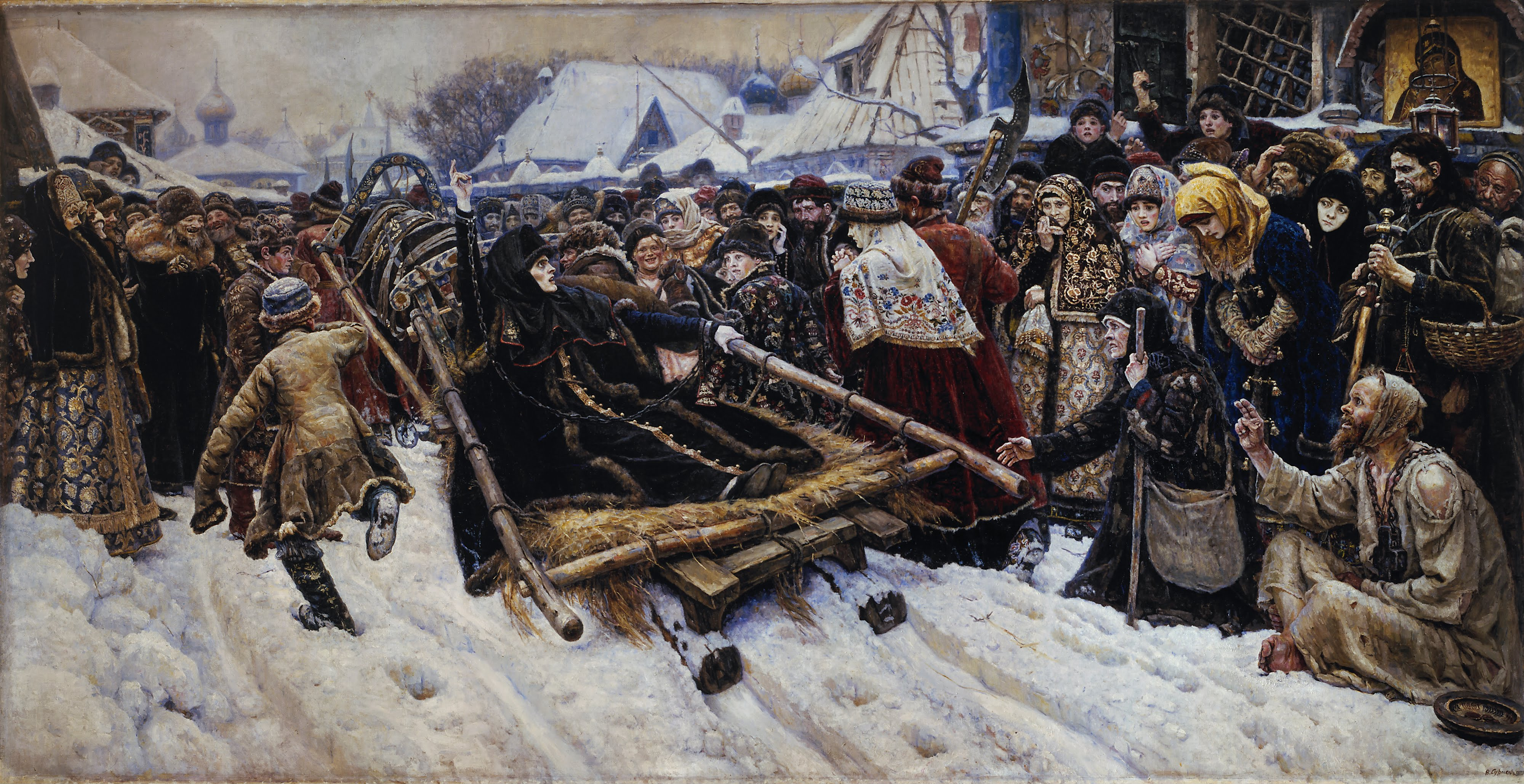
Feodosia Morozova, a patroness of the Moscow proto-Old Believers, being taken to prison, defiantly raising her hand in the two-fingered sign of the cross; a painting by Vasily Surikov, 1887.

The case brought by the defenders of the old practices found many supporters among different strata of the Russian society. Some of the low-ranking clergy protested against the increase of feudal oppression coming from the church leaders in the form of monastic serfdom, while some members of the high-ranking clergy joined the Raskol movement due to their discontent over Nikon's authoritative aspirations and the arbitrariness of his church reforms. The unification of such heterogeneous forces against what had become the "official" church could be explained by the somewhat contradictory ideology of the Raskol movement. A certain idealization and conservation of traditional values and old traditions, a critical attitude towards innovations, the conservation of national originality, and the acceptance of martyrdom in the name of the old faith were intertwined with criticism of the traditional practices of feudalism and serfdom. Different social strata were attracted to different sides of this ideology.

In the upper strata of ecclesiastic elites, Nikon's former friends among the Zealots of Piety were his most outspoken critics. Ivan Neronov spoke against the strengthening of patriarch's authority and demanded democratization of ecclesiastic management, while Avvakum directly protested the reformed rituals. However, both had already come into conflict with the Church before their participation in the Raskol: Neronov was engaged in a dispute over the collection of taxes, and Avvakum quarreled over assuming Neronov's position as Archpriest after Neronov's exile from Moscow. The first martyr for the pre-reform belief was Bishop Paul of Kolomna, who was burned in Novgorod in 1656 for defending the pre-reform texts. According to Old Believer tradition, Avvakum and his companions were burned in 1682. Secular aristocrats also participated in the Raskol movement, such as Boyarynya Feodosia Morozova and her sister Princess Evdokia Urusova, who openly supported the defenders of the old faith and were also martyred. Avvakum had been Morozova's confessor, and she followed Avvakum in rejecting the Nikonian reforms. After convincing her sister to join the Raskol, the two were arrested by the Tsar in 1671 and were starved to death in 1675.

In the lower strata of the popular, peasant defense of the old traditions, opposition often materialized as popular uprisings. Some of the supporters of the Old Believers took part in Stepan Razin's rebellion in 1670–1671. After Razin's beheading, many of his supporters joined other Raskol popular movements, such as the Solovetsky Monastery uprising and the Moscow uprising of 1682. At the Solovetsky Monastery, both monks and enserfed peasants rebelled against Tsarist authority, opposing what they saw as the exploitation of secular power: for the monks, this was the consolidation of central authority during the church schism, and for the peasants, this was feudal system which supported the centralizing Nikonian reforms. Both groups were united in their defense of the Old Belief. In the Moscow uprising of 1682, Old Believers openly preached to the Moscow Streltsy regiments who were in rebellion due to discontent with their superiors, and one of the leaders of the rebels, Prince Ivan Andreevich Khovansky, openly supported the pre-reform traditions. While occupying the capital, part of the rebel unit's conditions were that the official church must agree to a public disputation with the Old Believer priest Nikita Pustosvyat; his well-known debate with Patriarch Joachim of Moscow led to his beheading and to the Moscow uprising's alternative title as the "Raskolnik rebellion".

== Old Believers movement ==
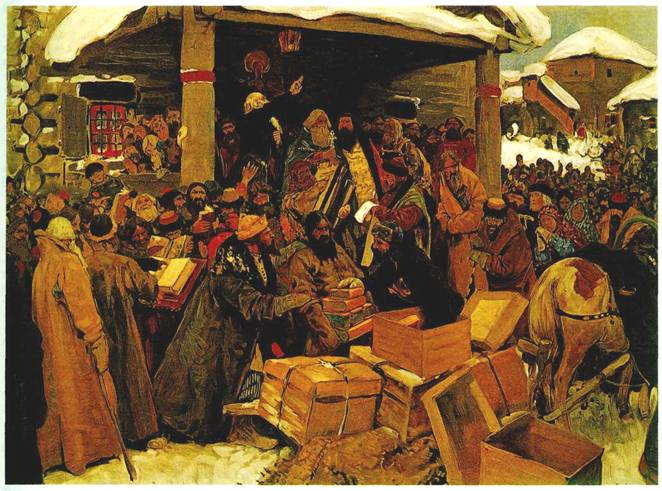
In this painting by Sergey Ivanov, peasants are shown with newly revised service books after the reforms.

In the wake of the persecutions of the 1600s, it was clear to many schismatics that reunion with the Russian Orthodox Church would be impossible. As a result of their conflict with official church hierarchy, the Old Believers (or: Old Ritualists) never formed a united movement. Instead, it was largely a movement of independent factions on the edges of the Russian empire, far from persecution and state authority. Old Believers fled to the dense forests of Northern Russia and Volga region, the southern borders of Russia, Siberia, and even abroad, where they would organize their own obshchinas. Many of the members of the old faith migrated west, seeking refuge bordering the Polish–Lithuanian Commonwealth, where the Warsaw Compact allowed them to practice their faith freely. In 1684, Princess Sophia, with active support from the Russian Orthodox Church, began to persecute the so-called raskolniki (раскольники 'schismatics'). Up to this point, Old Believers had merely been anathematized, but following Sophia's ukaz, local governments were commanded to burn all schismatics at the stake unless they submitted to the Nikonian reforms. The majority of Old Believers were peasants or cossacks, but this persecution inadvertently attracted members of the merchant class to the schismatics. Merchants were expected to collect taxes for the state, but since schismatics were persecuted by the government, schismatic merchants were exempt from this duty.

The memory of their schism with the official Russian Orthodox Church is fundamental to the Old Believers movement. Much of their literary canon consists of letters written by priests such as Avvakum, Epifanii, and Lazar during Nikon's reforms, as well as literature depicting Nikon as a devil or Antichrist. Particularly important to the canon is Avvakum's The Life Written By Himself, an account of his various exiles by authorities to Siberia. Since the Old Believers were denied the use of the printing press to print their literature and unrevised service books, they developed a robust tradition of manuscript writing and book collecting.

== Apocalypticism ==
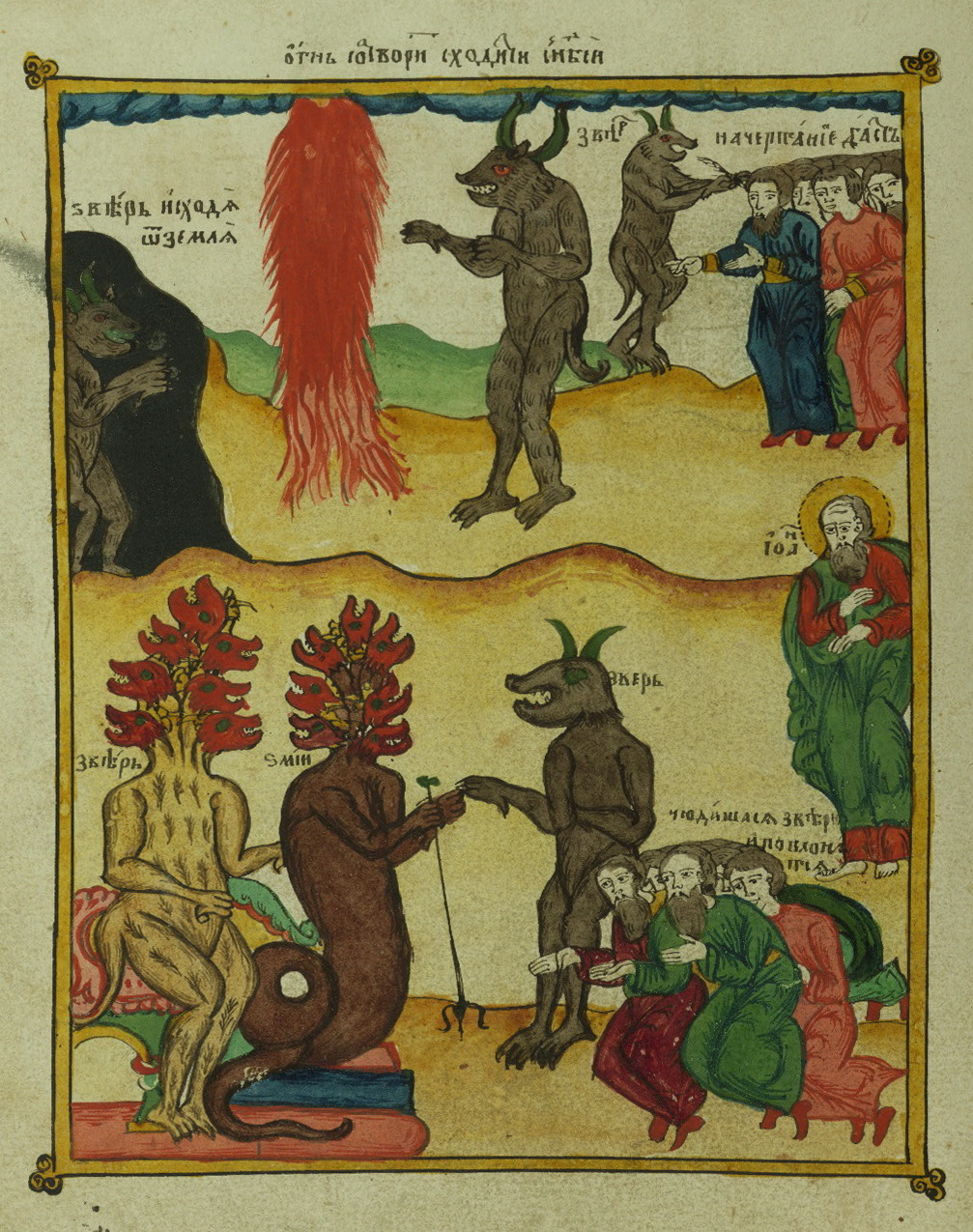
In this Old Believer miniature, the dragon and the beast are seated beside the two-horned Antichrist. Many Old Believers associated Nikon's reforms and the increasingly absolutist state as the arrival of the Antichrist, heralding Armageddon.

The most radical defenders of the Old Belief preached a message of apocalypticism and the coming of the Antichrist in connection with Nikon's reforms. Following the Time of Troubles, loss of ecclesiastic power and the legal enserfment of peasants in the Sobornoye Ulozheniye (not to mention a plague in Moscow), there was a general atmosphere of the end-times in Russia in the middle of the 1600s. The more famous early schismatics, such as Avvakum and his brothers-in-exile at the Pustozyorsk prison, often justified this time of strife as God's punishment of the ecclesiastic and tsarist authorities for their erroneous reforms. Nikon, being the figurehead of the reforms, was often framed in Old Believer tales either as an accomplice to the Antichrist, or even the Antichrist himself. Other state authorities, especially those who persecuted the Old Believers, such as Tsar Alexei, would also be decried by schismatics as agents of the Devil. The reforms of Nikon were seen by some Old Believers as direct manifestations of the Antichrist, with the altered sign of the cross compared to the mark of the beast, and the year of the 1666 Moscow Synod seen as indicating the number of the beast. By condemning its own saints and historical rituals, Old Believers further believed that Nikon's reforms plunged the Third Rome, Russia, into heresy, which was a clear indication of the end-times.

These ideas of the Antichrist's arrival on Earth and of the end-times found a broad response among the Russian people, who sympathized with the ideology of these more radical apologetes. The most dramatic practices of the Raskol included the practice of ognenniye kreshcheniya (огненные крещения, or baptism by fire), practiced by those who thought that the end of the world was near. Rather than submit to apostasy or to the Antichrist, Old Believers would burn themselves alive. These practices were inspired by the martyrs of the early Christian church, as well as the practices of earlier fringe ascetic movements, such as the self-immolating followers of Kapiton in the middle of the 1600s. This practice of active, fiery martyrdom gradually died out as the schism cooled down at the beginning of the 1700s. During the reign of Peter the Great, Old Believers who were not active political dissidents were no longer persecuted, so Old Believers no longer needed to martyr themselves rather than submit to the rule of what they perceived as agents of the Antichrist.

Kapiton's self-immolating followers, the lesnye startsy (лесные старцы lit. 'forest elders'), appeared in Russia at the same time as the Zealots of Piety and were equally inspired by the sense of Armageddon following the Time of Troubles; however, while the Zealots practiced optimistic conservation of ecclesiastic rites, the lesnye startsy believed in a kind of pessimistic triumph of the Antichrist over the world, where ecclesiastic rites were no longer meaningful. The Old Believers who preserve the conservative ideals of the Zealots of Piety are known as the Popovtsy, meaning "priested ones", as they accept clergymen ordained by the Nikonite Russian Orthodox Church but reject the church's authority; those who preserve the apocalyptic pessimism of Kapiton and other spiritual leaders are the Bezpopovtsy, the "priestless ones", as they reject both the established church's priesthood and authority. Many Bezpopovtsy sects reject any sacraments which are traditionally performed by priests, such as marriage, and therefore practice celibacy.
