= Solovetsky Monastery uprising =

Uprising against Alexis of Russia (1668–1676)

Coordinates: 65.024°N 35.711°E

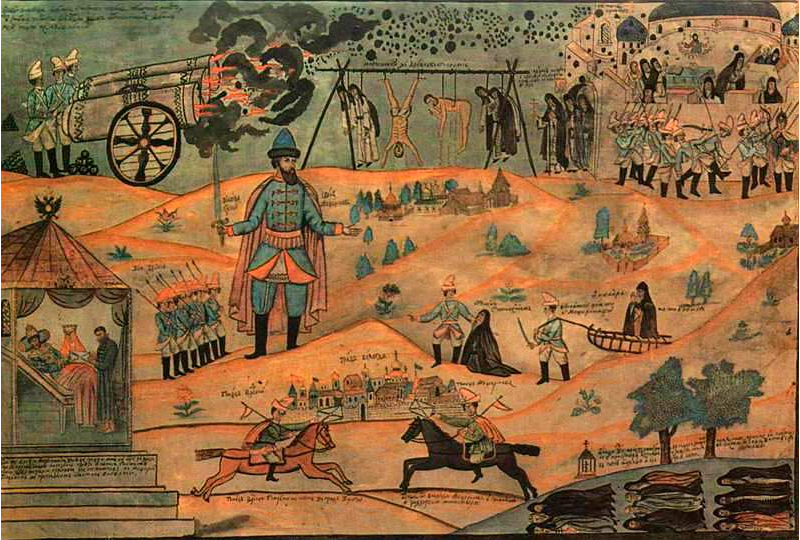
"Voivode Meshcherinov Putting Down the Solovki Rebellion". An early 19th-century hand-drawn lubok, attributed to Mikhail Grigoriev.

The Solovetsky Monastery uprising (Russian: Соловецкое восстание) was an uprising of Old Believer monks, known as the Raskol, of the northern Solovetsky Monastery against the policies of Tsar Aleksey I. The uprising involved the siege of the Solovetsky Monastery by the Tsar's forces over the years from 1668 to 1676.

== Uprising ==
The uprising started in the summer of 1668, when the high-ranking clergy of the monastery rose in opposition to Patriarch Nikon’s ecclesiastic reform soon after his defrocking. The majority of regular monks came out against the centralization of the Russian Orthodox Church and the Russian government, which had been reinforcing this centralization. Lay brothers, monastic workers, and pilgrims (пришлые люди, or prishliye lyudi) protested against the feudal oppression and monastic serfdom regulations in particular. An estimated 450-500 rebels took part in the Solovetsky Monastery Uprising, which began under the slogan of the struggle for the "Old Faith" in connection with the Old Believers movement (see Raskol).

On June 22, 1668, a Streltsy unit under the command of I. Volkhov arrived at the Solovetsky Islands to suppress the rebels. The monastery locked itself up and refused to let the Streltsy in. The uprising was supported by local peasants and workers (работные люди, or rabotniye lyudi), which would allow the monastery to withstand more than seven years of siege without experiencing any serious difficulties with food supplies and other necessities. Beside the regular food assistance from the outside, many visiting workers, runaway soldiers, and even Streltsy made their way onto the island and joined the rebels. In the early 1670s, a large number of Stenka Razin’s supporters joined the monastery uprising, which boosted it even more.

The besieged would often sally out of the monastery under the leadership of elected sotniks, such as the runaway boyar kholop I. Voronin, monastery peasant S. Vasiliev. The runaway Don Cossacks P. Zapruda and G. Krivonoga supervised the construction of new fortifications. By 1674, there had already been some 1000 Streltsy and a large number of guns outside the walls of the Solovetsky Monastery. The siege was now headed by voyevoda Ivan Mescherinov. The rebels had been successfully defending themselves until their betrayal by a monk named Feoktist, who showed the Streltsy an unprotected window of the monastery’s White Tower. This brought about the end of the uprising, which was suppressed with incredible brutality in January 1676. Only sixty rebels out of five hundred survived the seizure of the monastery. Large supplies of food were discovered stored in the monastery which would have been sufficient to withstand siege for several more years. Almost all of the remaining insurgents were later executed.
