= Pustozersk =

Defunct town in Russia

Coordinates: 67°32′N 52°35′E

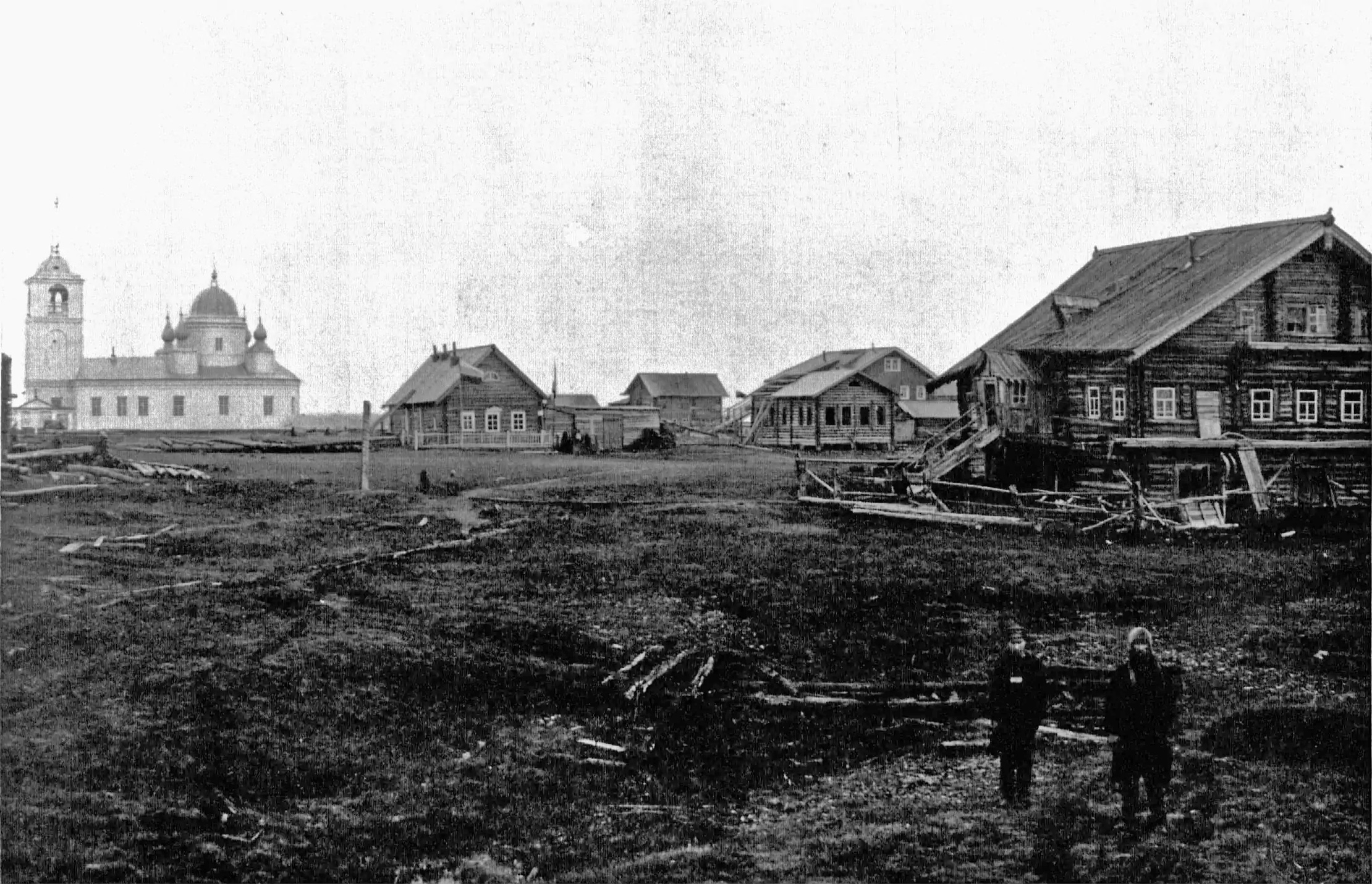
Pustozersk in 1909

Pustozersk or Pustozyorsk (Russian: Пустозёрск) was the first town built by Russians north of the Arctic Circle. It was the administrative center of Yugra and Pechora regions of the Russian Empire. It was situated in what is today Nenets Autonomous Okrug, about 20 km south-west of Naryan-Mar.

Pustozersk was founded in 1499 in the lower reaches of the Pechora River by Princes Semyon Kurbsky and Pyotr Ushaty. The town was built in a deserted area on barren soil, hence the name Pustozersk, which literally means "place of empty lakes", from пустых (of empty) + озер (lakes) + -ск (word ending for a place-name). It was the most distant northern outpost of Muscovy and the first Russian settlement on the Pechora. Pustozersk was supposed to play the role of a military fort on the northern borders of the Russian state. Beginning in 1644, the city was frequently attacked by Samoyedic peoples.

Pustozersk had been the administrative center of Pustozersk volost for more than two and a half centuries (until 1780). The town was most active in the 17th century, when such notable people as Artamon Matveyev, Vasily Galitzine, and Avvakum were exiled there. The spot where the latter was burnt at the stake is now commemorated by an ornate wooden cross.

In the 18th century, Pustozersk gradually lost its economic importance and began to deteriorate because a more convenient southern route to Siberia through the Urals had been discovered. In 1924, Pustozersk lost city status and was described as "not a city, but an ordinary, small northern village, numbering 25-30 houses and about forty non-residential buildings."

During World War II, 41 residents fought in the war, of whom 19 were killed. During the war, the population increased to 106, mostly from refugees, however after the war, the population dropped to 28 in 1951, and just 6 in 1959. The last residents left in 1962. The wooden Church of Transfiguration is the only structure that remained after the abandonment of Pustozeorsk. It was moved to the nearby village of Ustye, located on the Lake Gorodetskoye.

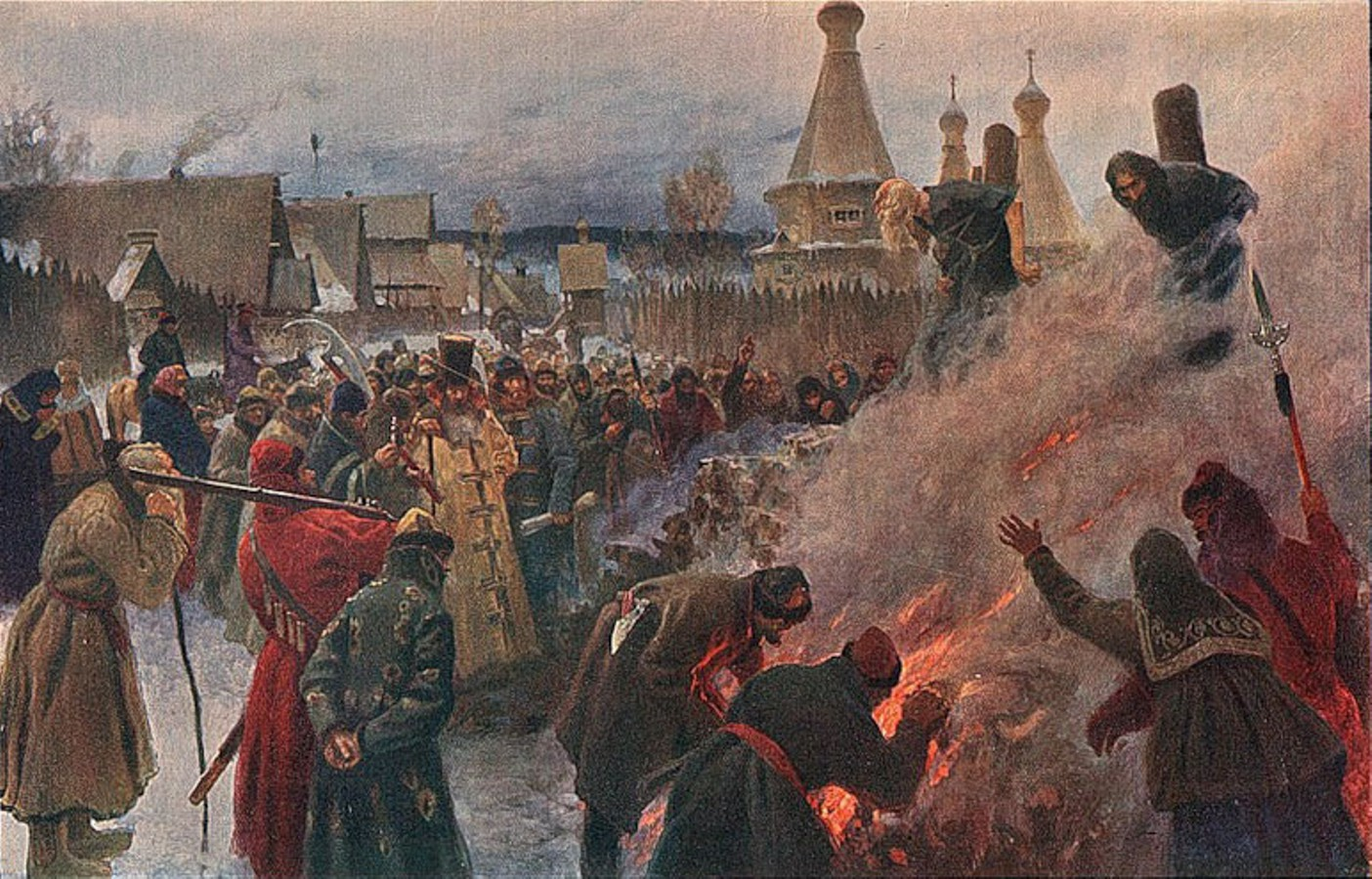
An 1892 painting showing the 1682 burning of Old Believer leader Avvakum and others in Pustozersk, Russia

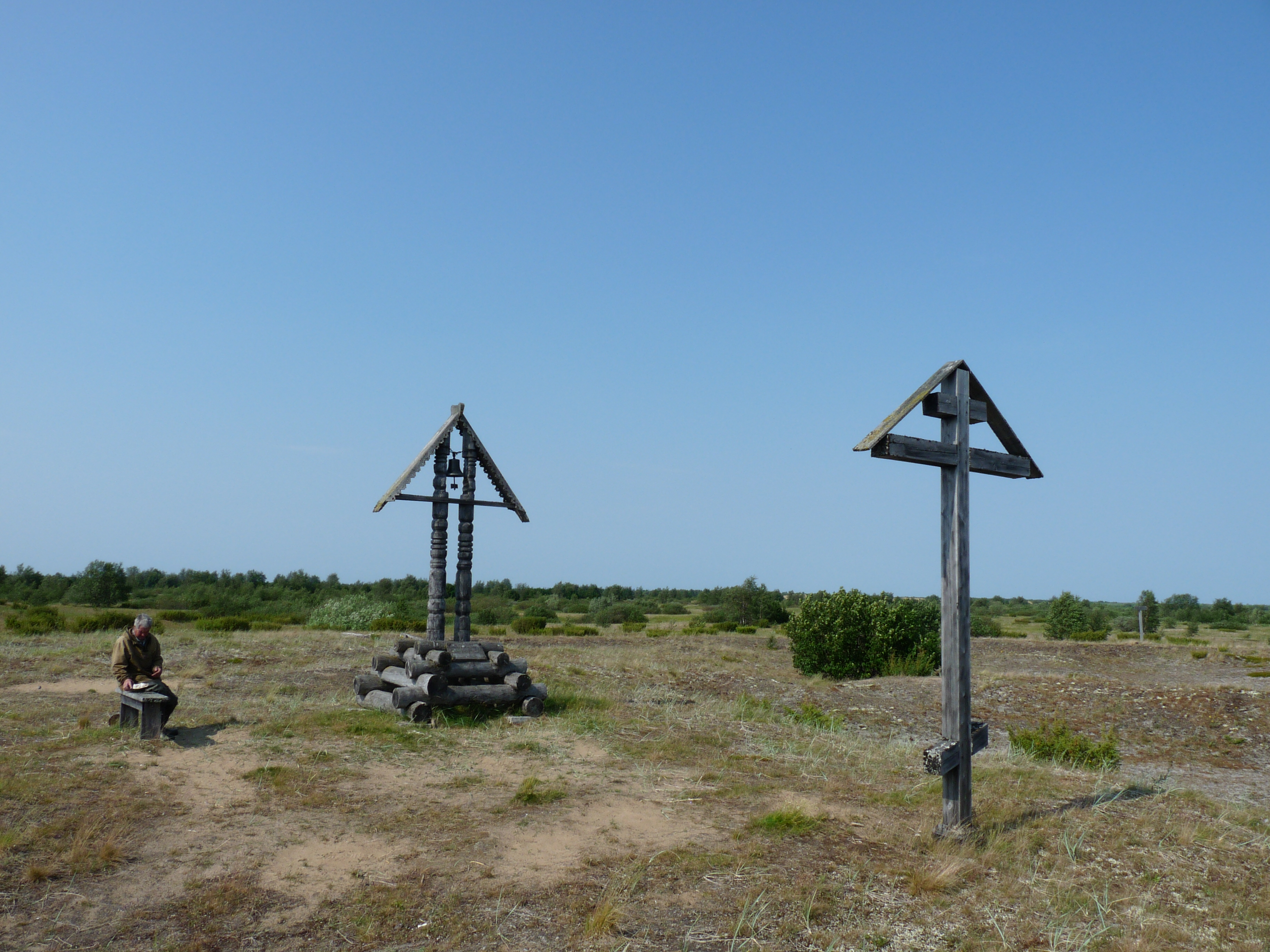
The memorial crosses on the site of Pustozyersk, placed where Avvakum was burned

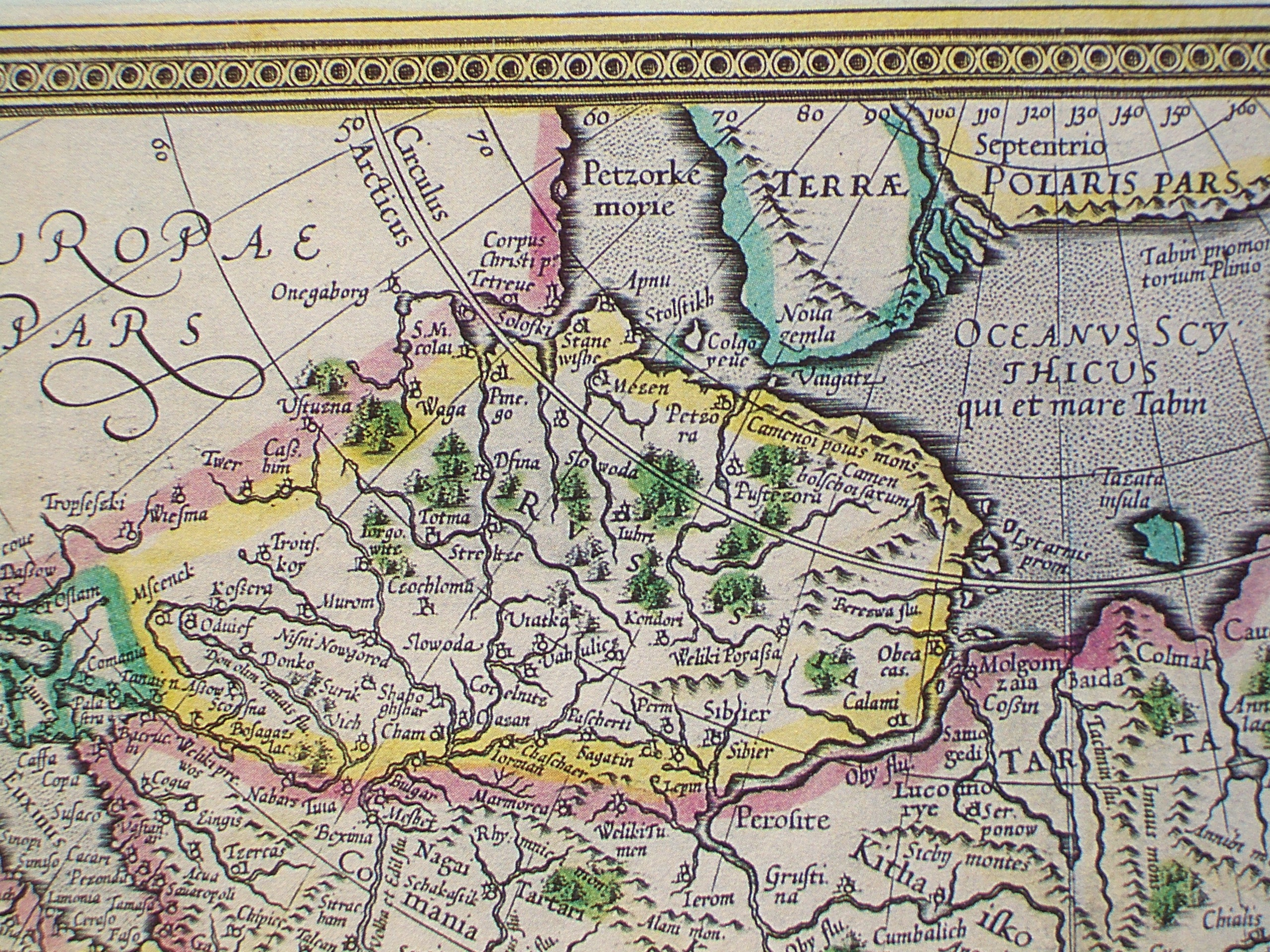
Pustozera on the Petzora River, just north of the Arctic Circle, on a Mercator's map published in 1595

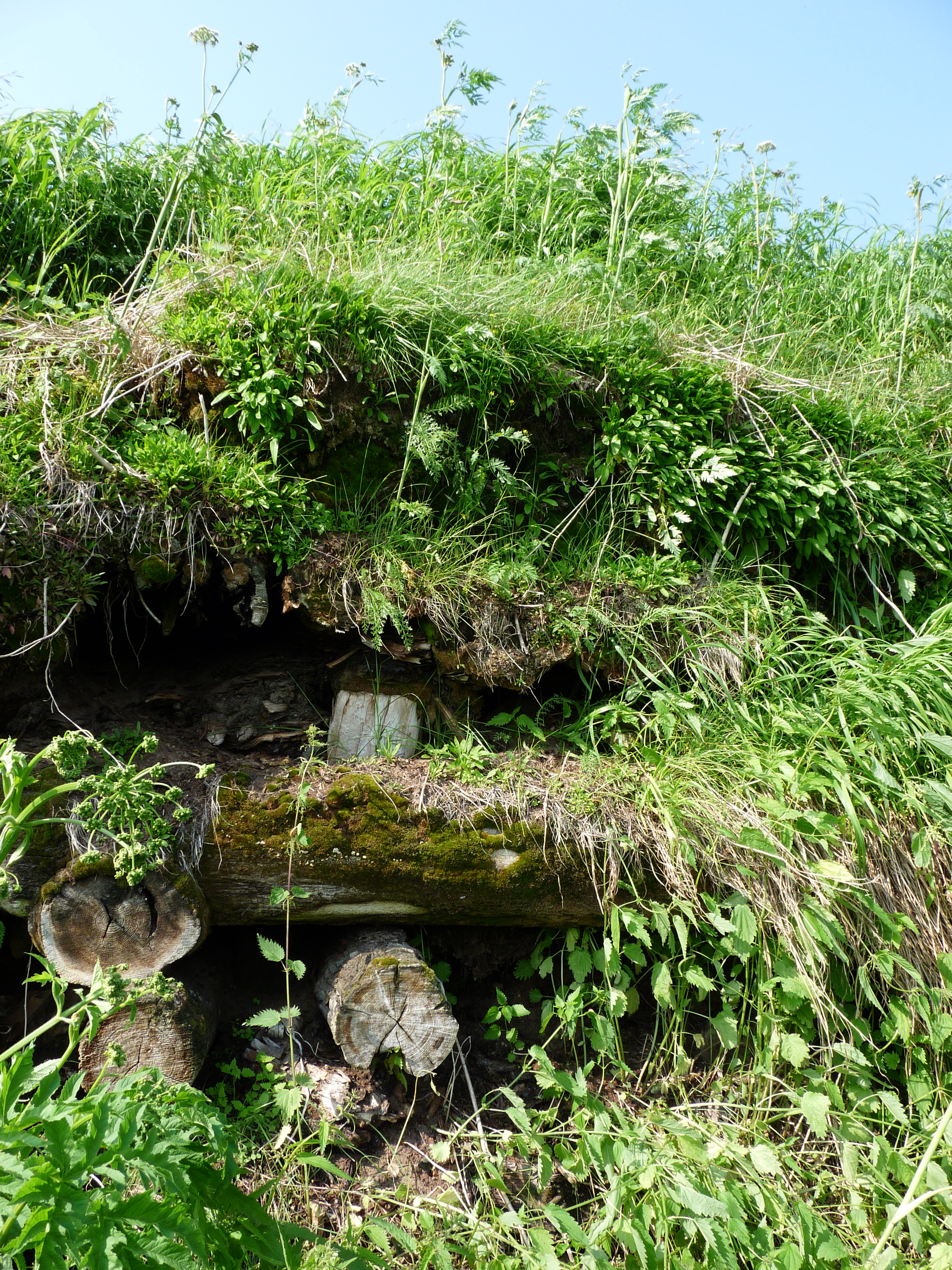
Vestiges of archeological excavations
