= Great Moscow Synod =

1666 Pan-Orthodox synod that deposed Patriarch Nikon

The Great Moscow Synod (Russian: Большой Московский собор, romanized: Bol'shoy Moskovskiy sobor) was a Pan-Orthodox synod convened by Tsar Alexis of Russia in Moscow in April 1666 in order to depose Patriarch Nikon of Moscow.

The council condemned the famous Stoglav of 1551 as heretical, because it had dogmatized the Russian church's rituals and usage at the expense of those accepted in Greece and other Eastern Orthodox countries. This decision precipitated a great schism of the Russian Orthodox Church known as the Raskol. Avvakum and other leading Old Believers were brought to the synod from their prisons. Since they refused to revise their views, the Old Believer priests were defrocked, anathemized and sentenced to life imprisonment in distant monasteries.

One of the decisions in the synod was a specific ban on a number of depictions of God the Father and the Holy Spirit, which then also resulted in a whole range of other icons being placed on the forbidden list.
