= Tsarsky titulyarnik =

1672 Russian illuminated manuscript

The Tsarsky titulyarnik (Russian: Царский титулярник), sometimes translated as Tsar's Book of Titles, in full the Big State Book or Root of Russian Sovereigns (Russian: Большая государева книга или Корень российских государей), is a 1672 illuminated manuscript containing portraits of Russian monarchs. It was issued by Alexis of Russia and produced under the direction of Artamon Matveyev, the head of the posolsky prikaz (foreign ministry). It also includes short biographies and illustrations of coats of arms, as well as portraits of foreign rulers.

== Gallery ==
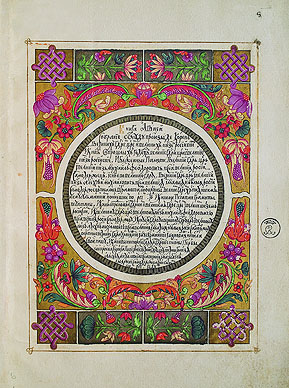
Title page of copy in Hermitage Museum

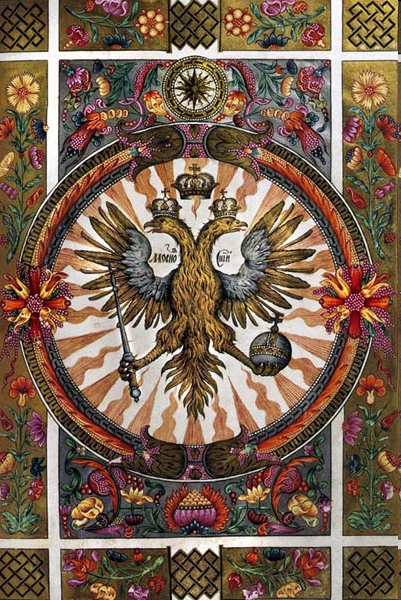
Coat of arms of Russia

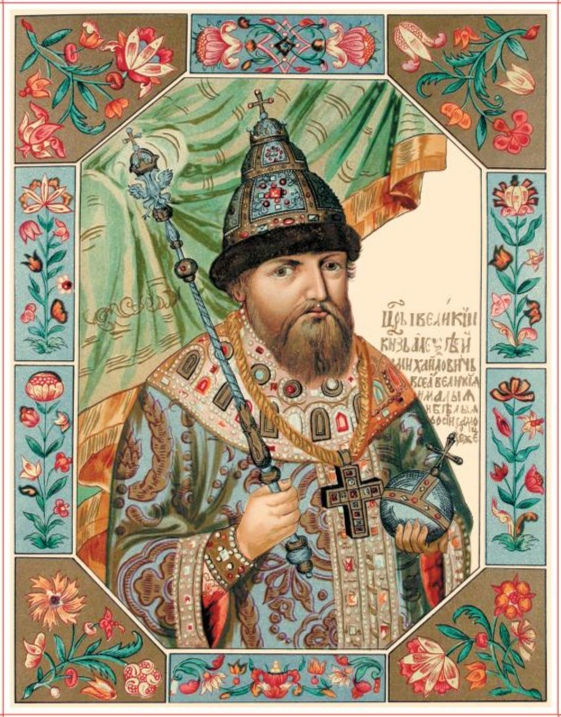
Portrait of Alexis of Russia

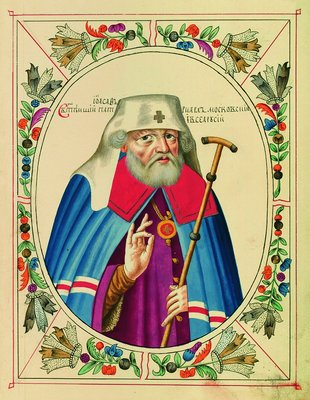
Portrait of Patriarch Joasaphus II of Moscow

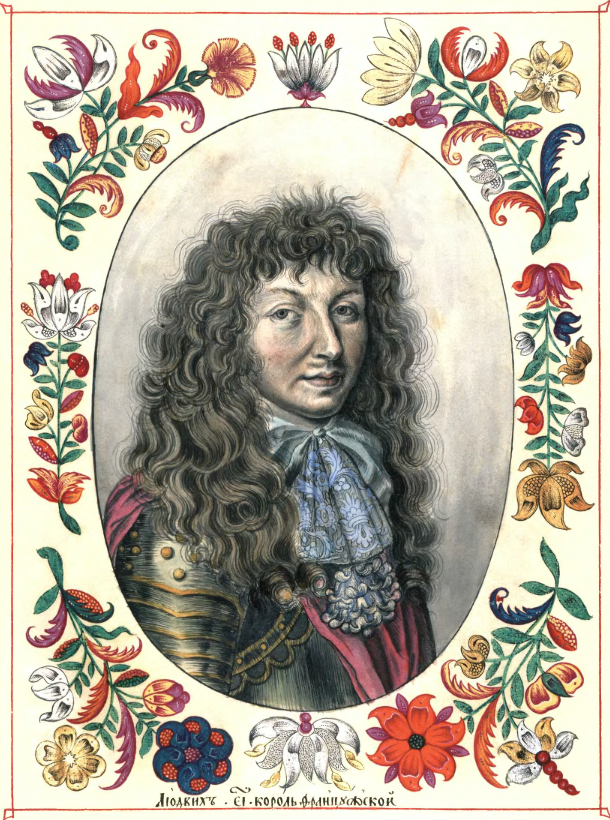
Portrait of Louis XIV
