= Zealots of Piety =

The Zealots of Piety (Russian: Кружок ревнителей благочестия, romanized: Kružok revnitelej blagočestija) was a circle of ecclesiastical and secular individuals beginning in the late 1630s in Russia at the time of church schism, which gathered around Stefan Vonifatiyev, the confessor of tsar Alexei Mikhailovich. The impetus to the group's formation was the Time of Troubles. The members believed the massacres and conflagrations of the time to be the manifestation of a wrathful God, angry with the Russian people's lack of religiosity. In response, the group called for the rebirth of the Russian Orthodox faith, and a renewal of the religious piety of the masses.

The Zealots of Piety included Fyodor Rtishchev, Archmandrite Nikon (Minin) of the Novospassky Monastery (future Patriarch of Moscow and All Russia), archpriests Ivan Neronov of the Kazan Cathedral, Avvakum Petrov, Loggin, Lazar, and Daniil. The members of the Zealots of Piety wanted to enhance the authority of the Russian Orthodox Church and increase its influence upon the people. Among other goals of the circle were the struggle against the shortcomings and vices of the clergy, revival of church sermons and other means for influencing the masses. They also aimed to assist the needy and weak in Russian society, protecting them from social injustice, and to spread the Gospel to the Russian people, making faith more integral in daily life. The Zealots of Piety soon became the actual rulers of the Russian Orthodox Church, thanks to the support from the tsar, who had paid much attention to the advice of his confessor.

After Nikon had been elected patriarch in 1652, the groups turned against their former member, protesting several of his reforms. Over time, the group began to dissolve, as many of its members became active figures in the Old Believers movement.

== Bibliography ==
- "Вонифатьев, Стефан" . Brockhaus and Efron Encyclopedic Dictionary (in Russian). 1906.
- Лавров, А. С.; Морохин, А. В. (2021). Ревнители благочестия: очерки церковной и литературной деятельности. Saint Petersburg: Наука. ISBN 978-5-02-040510-3.
