= List of heads of the Russian Orthodox Church =

This is a list of heads of the Russian Orthodox Church.

== Metropolitans of Kiev and all Rus' ==
=== Kiev Metropolitanate (988–1441) ===
1. St. Michael I (988–992)
2. Leontius (992–1008)
3. Theophilact (1008 – until 1018)
4. John I (1008/18 – c. 1030)
5. Theopemptus (c. 1035 – 1040th)
6. Cyril I (Note: Is not listed in Russian Chronicles; probably 1039–1051)
7. Hilarion I (1051–1054) (Note: First Ruthenian metropolitan)
8. Ephraim (1054/1055 – c. 1065)
9. Georgius (c. 1065 – c. 1076)
10. St. John II (not later than 1076/1077 – after August 1089)
11. John III (summer 1090 – before 14 August 1091)
12. Nicholas (c. 1093 – before 1104)
13. Nicephorus I (18 December 1104 – April 1121)
14. Nikita (15 October 1122 – 9 March 1126)
15. Michael II (summer 1130 – 1145)
16. Kliment Smoliatich (27 July 1147 – early 1155)
17. St. Constantine I (1156 – 1158/1159)
18. Theodore (August 1160 – June 1163)
19. John IV (spring 1164 – 1166)
20. Constantine II (1167 – 1169/1170)
21. Michael III (spring 1171 – ?)
22. Nicephorus II (before 1183 – after 1201)
23. Matthew (before 1210 – 19 August 1220)
24. Cyril II (1224/1225 – autumn 1233)
25. Joseph (1242/1247 – ?)
26. Cyril III (1242/1247 – 27 November 1281)
27. St. Maximus (1283 – 6 December 1305 (Note: Before 1299 in Kiev, then in Vladimir))
28. St. Peter (1308 – 21 December 1326)
29. St. Theognostus (1328–1353)
30. St. Alexius (1354–1378)
31. Michael (1379)
32. St. Cyprian (1381–1383)
33. Pimen (1382 – 1384 (Note: In contention with Cyprian. Factually until 1389))
34. St. Dionysius (1383–1385 (Note: In contention with Cyprian. Factually until 1385))
35. St. Cyprian (1390–1406 restored)
36. St. Photius (1408–1431)
37. Gerasimus (1433–1435)
38. Isidore (1437–1441)

In 1441, Metropolitan Isidore of Moscow embraced the Union of Florence which briefly healed the Great Schism by re-uniting various Eastern Catholic Churches with the Holy See. Under pressure from Vasily II, princes of the Grand Duchy of Moscow denounced the union with Rome and imprisoned Isidore in the Chudov Monastery for two years. The metropolitan see lay vacant for seven years. In 1448, the secular authorities appointed Jonah of Moscow as metropolitan since Isidore was adjudged to have apostatized to Catholicism. Like his immediate predecessors, he permanently resided in Moscow, and was the last Moscow-based primate of the metropolis to keep the traditional title with reference to the metropolitan city of Kiev. He was also the first metropolitan in Moscow to be appointed without the approval of the Ecumenical Patriarch of Constantinople as had been the norm. Some time after his appointment, Jonah unilaterally changed his title to "Metropolitan of Moscow and all Rus' " which was a de facto declaration of independence of the Church in north-eastern Rus' from the Patriarchate of Constantinople.

== Metropolitans of Moscow and all Rus' ==
1. Jonah (1448–1461)
2. Theodosius (3 May 1461 – 13 September 1464)
3. Philip I (11 November 1464 – 5 April 1473)
4. St. Gerontius (29 June 1473 – 28 May 1489)
5. Zosimus (26 September 1490 – 9 February 1495)
6. Simon (22 September 1495 – 30 April 1511)
7. Varlaam (3 August 1511 – 18 December 1521)
8. Daniel (27 February 1522 – 2 February 1539)
9. St. Joasaphus (6 February 1539 – January 1542)
10. St. Macarius (19 March 1542 – 31 December 1563)
11. Athanasius (5 March 1564 – 16 May 1566)
  - Herman (July 1566)
12. St. Philip II (25 July 1566 – 4 November 1568)
13. Cyril IV (11 November 1568 – 8 February 1572)
14. Anthony (May 1572 – early 1581)
15. Dionisyus (1581 – 13 October 1586)
16. Job (11 December 1586 – 23 January 1589)

== Patriarchs of Moscow and all Rus' ==
=== First Patriarchial Period (1589–1721) ===
Patriarch	Worldly name	Period		Portrait
St. Job	Ivan	23 January 1589	June 1605	
Ignatius (Note: As Ignatius was personally elected by False Dmitriy I and during the rule of Patriarch Job, he was not the legitimate Patriarch of Moscow. After death of the monarch, Ignatius was removed from office in a Council.)		30 June 1605	May 1606	
St. Hermogenes	Yermolay	3 June 1606	17 February 1612	
Philaret	Fyodor Nikitich Romanov	24 June 1619	1 October 1633	
Joasaphus I		6 February 1634	28 November 1640	
Joseph	Dyakov	27 May 1642	15 April 1652	
Nikon	Nikita Minin (Minov)	25 July 1652	12 December 1666	
Joasaphus II	Novotorzhets (nickname)	10 February 1667	17 February 1672	
Pitirim		7 July 1672	19 April 1673	
Joachim	Ivan Petrovich Savelov	26 June 1674	17 March 1690	
Adrian (Note: No successor after the death of Patriarch Adrian. From 1700–1721 the keeper of the Patriarchial throne (Exarch) was Metropolitan Stefan (Yavorsky) of Yaroslavl. After Peter I opened the Ecclesiastical College in 1721, the highest church body became the Most Holy Synod. The Patriarchy was recovered by the National Orthodox Council on 28 October 11 November 1917)	Andrey	24 August 1690	16 October 1700	

=== Most Holy Synod (1721–1917) ===
The Ober-Procurator (Imperial Delegate having the procuration for religious affairs) was a non-clerical officer who assisted the Most Holy Synod from 1722 to 1917 after the Church reform of Peter the Great. The real "head" of the Synod and most important clerical figure was the Primus or Prime member, its legal chairman, always a Metropolitan or an Archbishop. The first Primus was the Metropolitan Stefan Yavorsky, who had been the administrator of the Patriarchate of Moscow for over twenty years (1700–1721).

After Paul I of Russia in 1797, the Emperor of Russia had the title of "Head of the Church".

=== Second Patriarchial Period (since 1917) ===
Patriarch	Worldly name	Election	Period		Portrait
St. Tikhon	Vasily Ivanovich Bellavin	1917–18	4 (21) December 1917	7 April 1925	
Sergius	Ivan Nikolayevich Stragorodsky	1943	8 September 1943	15 May 1944	
Alexius I	Sergey Vladimirovich Simansky	1945	2 February 1945	17 April 1970	
Pimen I	Sergey Mikhailovich Izvekov	1971	2 June 1971	3 May 1990	
Alexius II	Alexey Mikhailovich Ridiger	1990	10 June 1990	5 December 2008	
Kirill	Vladimir Mikhailovich Gundyaev	2009	1 February 2009	Incumbent	

== See also ==
- List of metropolitans and patriarchs of Moscow
