= List of metropolitans and patriarchs of Moscow =

Monogram of the current Patriarch of Moscow and all Rus', Kirill.

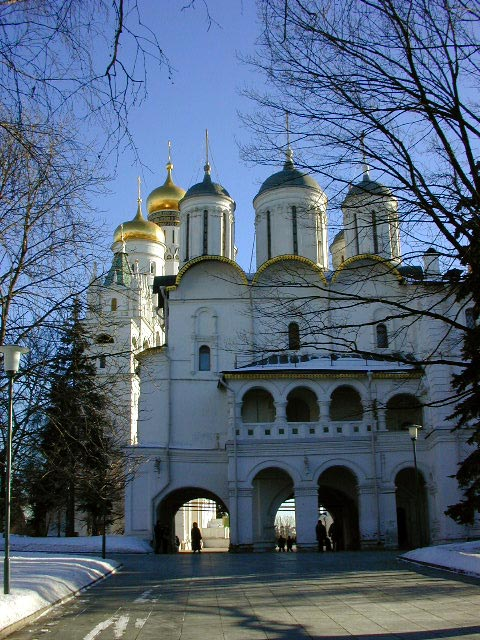
Church of the Twelve Apostles, Cathedral Square, Kremlin – cathedral church of the Patriarchs of Moscow.

This article lists the metropolitans and patriarchs of Moscow, spiritual heads of the Russian Orthodox Church. Since 1308, there have been 59.

== History ==
The Russian Orthodox Church traces its beginnings to the Christianization of Kievan Rus' at Kiev in 988 AD. In 1316 the Metropolitan of Kiev changed his see to the city of Vladimir, and in 1322 moved again to Moscow. In 1589, the see was elevated to a Patriarchate. The Patriarchate was abolished by the Church reform of Peter the Great in 1721 and replaced by the Most Holy Governing Synod, and the Bishop of Moscow came to be called a Metropolitan again. The Patriarchate was restored by the 1917–18 Local Council and suspended by the Soviet government in 1925. It was reintroduced for the last time by the 1943 Bishops' Council, during World War II by the initiative of Soviet leader Joseph Stalin. To this date, 19 of the Metropolitans have been glorified in the Russian Orthodox Church.

== Metropolitans of Kiev and all Rus' (permanent residence in Moscow, 1325–1441) ==
For a list of metropolitans before the seat of the Metropolis of Kiev and all Rus' was moved to Moscow, see List of metropolitans and patriarchs of Kyiv.

No.	Primate	Portrait	Reign	Notes
1	St. Peter		1308–1326	
Seat vacant 1326–1328
2	St. Theognostus		1328–1353	
3	St. Alexius		1354–1378	
	Mikhail (Mityay) (ru)		1378–1379	Locum tenens
Seat vacant 1379–1381
4	St. Cyprian		1381–1382	First tenure
5	Pimen		1382–1384	In opposition
6	St. Dionysius I		1384–1385	In opposition
Seat vacant 1385–1390
	St. Cyprian		1390–1406	Second tenure
Seat vacant 1406–1408
7	St. Photius		1408–1431	
Seat vacant 1431–1433
8	Gerasim (ru)		1433–1435	
9	Isidore of Kiev		1436–1441	Deposed by the Grand Prince of Moscow, Vasily II, over his acceptance of the Council of Florence. The deposition was not recognized by the Ecumenical Patriarch of Constantinople.
Seat vacant 1441–1448 (according to the Grand Duke of Moscow)

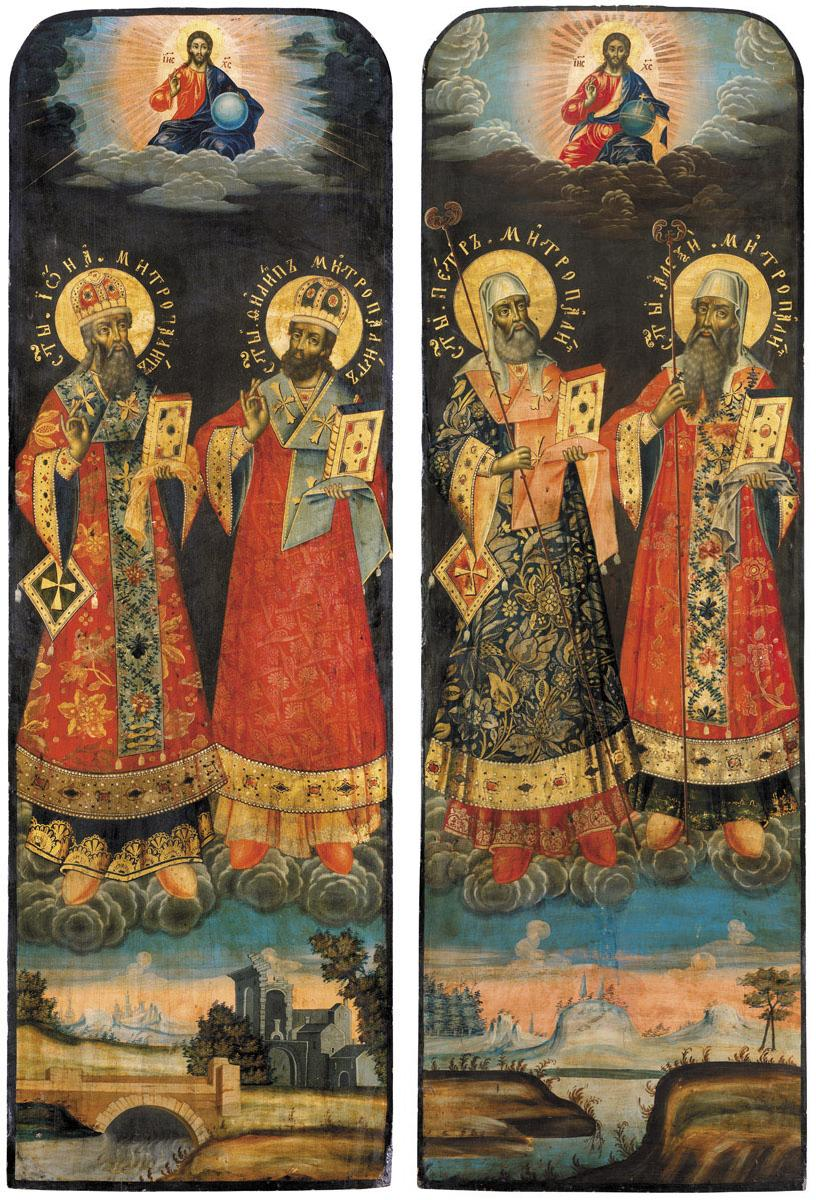
Five Holy Metropolitans (Peter, Alexius, Jonah, Philip). 18th century icon

Isidore of Kiev, who was of Greek origin, submitted to the articles of the Bull of Union with the Greeks which united the Orthodox Church in Russia with the Latin Church. Following his acceptance of the Council of Florence, Isidore returned to Moscow in 1441 as a Ruthenian cardinal. He was arrested by the Grand Prince of Moscow — Vasily II, and accused of apostasy. The Grand Duke deposed Isidore and in 1448 installed his own candidate as Metropolitan of Kiev — Jonah. This was carried out without the approval of Patriarch Gregory III of Constantinople. When Isidore died in 1458, the Orthodox dioceses within the territory of the Grand Duchy of Lithuania, including Kiev, were reorganized. The metropolitan see was moved to Vilnius, the capital of the Grand Duchy of Lithuania. A parallel succession to the title ensued between Moscow and Vilnius.

== Metropolitans of Moscow and all Rus' (1448–1589) ==
The Grand Prince of Moscow voided the Union of Florence and imprisoned Metropolitan Isidore for some time. Following that incident, the Grand Prince removed Isidore from office and appointed his own man — Jonah. These decisions were not recognised by Patriarch Gregory III of Constantinople who continued to recognise Isidore as the canonical metropolitan. As a result, in 1448, Jonah unilaterally changed his title to "Metropolitan of Moscow and all Rus' " which was tantamount to a declaration of independence of the Church in eastern Rus' from the Patriarchate of Constantinople. All sixteen successive hierarchs of the Metropolis of Moscow and all Rus' were selected by the civil power and installed without the approval of the Patriarchate of Constantinople. Successive patriarchs continued to recognize Isidore and his successors as hierarchs of the Metropolis of Kiev and all Rus'.

No.	Primate	Portrait	Reign		Notes
1	St. Jonah		1448	1461	Installed without the approval of Patriarch Gregory III of Constantinople who continued to recognize Isidore until his death in 1458.
2	Theodosius		3 May 1461	13 September 1464	Became the second Metropolitan to be appointed by the Grand Duke of Moscow. He was not recognised by the Patriarch of Constantinople.
3	St. Philip I		11 November 1464	5 April 1473	
4	St. Gerontius		29 June 1473	28 May 1489	
5	Zosimus		26 September 1490	17 May 1494	Removed from the metropolitan throne on charges of heresy
6	Simon		22 September 1495	30 April 1511	
7	Varlaam		3 August 1511	18 December 1521	
8	Daniel; 1492–1547		27 February 1522	2 February 1539	Deposed by the Shuyskys after the death of de facto regent Elena Glinskaya and the fall of her favorite Ivan Ovchina-Telepnev.
9	St. Joasaphus; Skripitsyn died 1555		6 February 1539	January 1542	Deposed by the Shuysky
10	St. Macarius		19 March 1542	31 December 1563	
11	Athanasius died 1575		5 March 1564	16 May 1566	
12	St. Herman; Grigory Sadyrev-Polyev		July 1566		Metropolitan-elect. Expelled from Moscow after a dispute with Ivan IV
13	St. Philip II; Feodor Kolychyov; 1507–1569		25 July 1566	4 November 1568	Deposed and believed to have been later killed by Ivan IV's officials
14	Cyril III (IV); 1492–1572		11 November 1568	8 February 1572	
15	Anthony		May 1572	1581	
16	Dionysius II died 1591		1581	13 October 1587	Deposed
17	St. Job		11 December 1587	23 January 1589	Elevated to "Patriarch of Moscow"

== Patriarchs of Moscow and all Rus' (1589–1721) ==
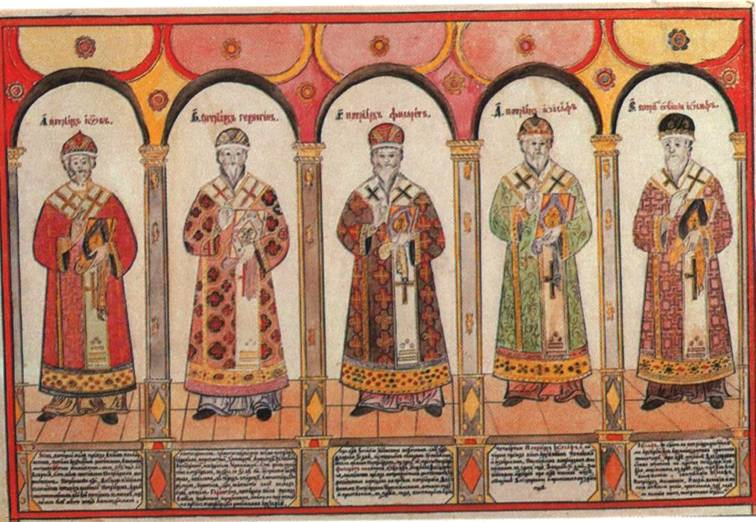
First five Patriarchs (Job, Hermogenes, Philaret, Joasaphus I, Joseph). 19th century lubok

No.	Primate	Portrait	Reign		Notes
1	St. Job		23 January 1589	June 1605	
—	Ignatius		30 June 1605	16 May 1606	
2	St. Hermogenes		3 July 1606	17 February 1612	
Seat vacant 1612–1619
3	Filaret; Fyodor Romanov; 1553–1633		24 June 1619	1 October 1633	Father of Michael of Russia
4	Joasaphus I		6 February 1634	28 November 1640	
Seat vacant 1640–1642
5	Joseph; Ignaty Dyakov		27 May 1642	15 April 1652	
6	Nikon; Nikita Minin; 1605–1681		25 July 1652	12 December 1666	
—	Pitirim		1658	1667	locum tenens
7	Joasaphus II		31 January 1667	17 February 1672	
8	Pitirim		7 July 1672	19 April 1673	
9	Joachim; Ivan Savyolov; 1620–1690		26 July 1674	17 March 1690	
10	Adrian		26 August 1690	16 October 1700	
—	Stefan		1700	1721	Locum tenens

== Metropolitans and archbishops of Moscow (1721–1917) ==
No.	Primate	Portrait	Reign		Notes
1	Stefan; Simeon Yavorsky (1658–1722)		1721	1722	President of the Most Holy Synod. Stefan refused to sign the Synod's documents, did not attend its meetings. Peter I apparently appointed him only to give a certain sanction to the new institution.
2	Theophan; Prokopovich (1681–1736)		1722	1736	Vice president of the Synod and its prime member since 15 July 1726
Seat vacant 1736–1742
3	Joseph (ru); Volchansky		1 September 1742	10 June 1745	Archbishop of Moscow and Vladimir
4	Plato I (ru); Pavel Malinovsky		5 April 1748	14 June 1754	Archbishop of Moscow and Sevsk
	Hilarion (ru); Grigorovich (1696–1759)		1754–1757		Coadjutor
5	Timothy (ru); Tikhon Shcherbatsky (1698–1767)		22 October 1757	3 January 1767	Metropolitan of Moscow and Kaluga
6	Ambrosius; Andrey Sertis-Kamensky (1708–1771)		18 January 1768	16 September 1771	Archbishop of Moscow. Murdered during the Moscow plague riot of 1771
	Samoel (ru)		1771–1775		Coadjutor
7	Plato II; Levshin (1737–1812)		20 January 1775	13 June 1812	Metropolitan of Moscow and Kolomna since 1787
Seat vacant 1812–1818
8	Augustine (ru); Alexey Vinogradsky (1766–1819)		19 February 1818	15 March 1819	Archbishop of Moscow and Kolomna
9	Seraphim (ru); Stefan Glagolevsky (1763–1843)		15 March 1819	19 June 1821	Metropolitan of Moscow and Kolomna
10	St. Philaret; Vasily Drozdov (1783–1867)		15 July 1821	2 December 1867	Archbishop of Moscow and Kolomna, metropolitan since 1826
11	St. Innocent; Ivan Veniaminov (1797–1879)		5 January 1868	12 April 1879	
12	Macarius I Mikhail Bulgakov (1816–1882)		20 April 1879	21 June 1882	
13	Joannicius (ru); Ivan Rudnev (1826–1900)		27 June 1882	17 November 1891	
14	Leontius (ru); Ivan Lebedinsky (1822–1893)		17 November 1891	13 August 1893	
15	Sergius (ru); Nikolay Lyapidevsky (1820–1898)		21 August 1893	23 February 1898	
16	St. Vladimir; Vasily Bogoyavlensky (1848–1918)		5 March 1898	6 December 1912	
17	St. Macarius II; Mikhail Nevsky (1835–1926)		8 December 1912	2 April 1917	

== Patriarchs of Moscow and all Rus' (restored, 1917–present) ==
No.	Primate	Portrait	Election	Reign			Notes
11	St. Tikhon; Vasily Bellavin (1865–1925)		1917–18	4 December 1917	7 April 1925	7 years, 4 months and 3 days	
—	St. Peter; Pyotr Polyansky (1862–1937)		—	12 April 1925	December 1925 / 11 September 1936	10–11 years	Metropolitan of Krutitsy, locum tenens
—	Sergius; Ivan Stragorodsky (1867–1944)		—	December 1925	27 December 1936	17 years, 9 months	Metropolitan of Nizhny Novgorod, acting locum tenens
—	Sergius; Ivan Stragorodsky (1867–1944)		—	27 December 1936	12 September 1943	17 years, 9 months	Metropolitan of Moscow and Kolomna, locum tenens
12	Sergius; Ivan Stragorodsky (1867–1944)		1943	12 September 1943	15 May 1944	8 months and 3 days	
13	Alexy I Sergey Simansky (1877–1970)		1945	4 February 1945	17 April 1970	25 years, 2 months and 13 days	
14	Pimen I Sergey Izvekov (1910–1990)		1971	3 June 1971	3 May 1990	18 years and 11 months	During Pimen I's reign the 1000th anniversary of the Christianization of Rus' was celebrated, and the 1988 Local Council was held in connection with the celebration.
15	Alexy II; Aleksei Ridiger (1929–2008)		1990	10 June 1990	5 December 2008	18 years, 5 months and 25 days	
16	Kirill; Vladimir Gundyayev (born 1946)		2009	1 February 2009	Incumbent	17 years, 5 months and 17 days (as of 18 July 2026)	

== See also ==
- Russian Orthodox Church
  - Patriarch of Moscow and all Rus'
- List of heads of the Russian Orthodox Church
- List of metropolitans and patriarchs of Kyiv
- List of current popes and patriarchs
- List of current Christian leaders
- Eastern Orthodox Church
- Organization of the Eastern Orthodox Church
