= Metropolitan Dionysius =

Metropolitan Dionysius may refer to:

- Dionysius, Metropolitan of Kiev in 1384–1385
- Dionysius, Metropolitan of Moscow in 1581–1587
- Dionysius, Metropolitan of Warsaw in 1923–1948
