= Juvenal Poyarkov =

Russian Orthodox hierarch

His Eminence Juvenal (Poyarkov)
- Metropolitan of Krutitsy and Kolomna
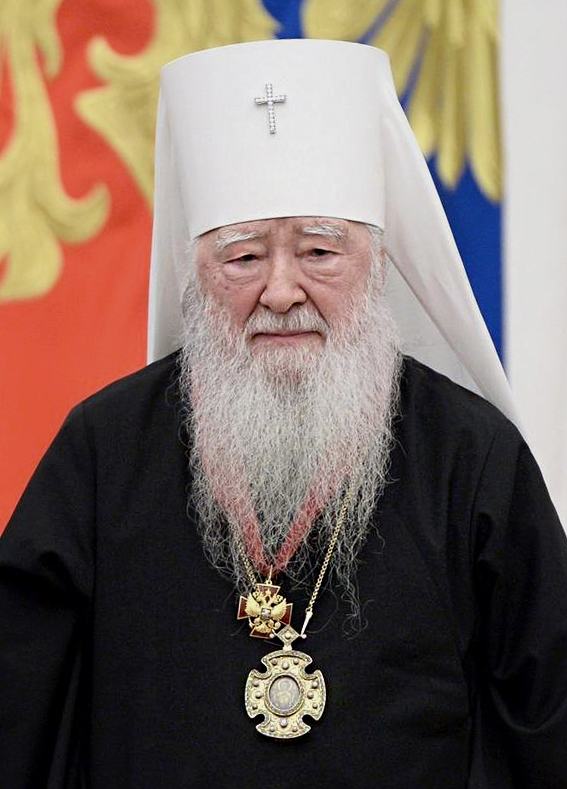
- Metropolitan Juvenal in 2016
- Native name: Владимир Кириллович Поярков
- Church: Russian Orthodox Church
- Installed: 11 June 1977
- Term ended: 15 April 2021
- Predecessor: Seraphim (Nikitin)
- Successor: Paul (Ponomaryov)

Orders
- Ordination: 1 January 1960
- Consecration: 25 December 1965

Personal details
- Born: 22 September 1935 (age 91) Yaroslavl, Russian SFSR, Soviet Union
- Education: Leningrad Spiritual Academy

Metropolitan Yuvenaly, former Krutitsy and Kolomna (Russian: Ювеналий, митрополит Крутицкий и Коломенский; born Vladimir Kirillovich Poyarkov (Russian: Владимир Кириллович Поярков); 22 September 1935) is a hierarch of the Russian Orthodox Church. The metropolitans of Krutitsy (previously, Sarsky) have traditionally served as auxiliary bishops to the Patriarchs of Moscow, but with a special elevated status making them equal to a ruling diocesan bishop (Russian: Патриарший наместник) for the countryside part (the Moscow Region) of the Moscow diocese.

On 15 April 2021, he was retired according to his request.

After the death of Metropolitan Vladimir (Kotlyarov), he was the oldest bishop by ordination, and after the death of Metropolitan Chrysostom (Martishkin), he was the oldest bishop by age in the Russian Orthodox Church.

== Biography ==
Vladimir Poyarkov was born in Yaroslavl on September 22, 1935. He entered the Leningrad Spiritual Academy in 1953, completing his studies there in 1957. He was tonsured a monk two years later and named hierodeacon of the Prince Vladimir Church in Leningrad that same year. He was ordained to the priesthood on January 1, 1960. He was named hegumen in 1962 and archimandrite the following year. He was chosen as Vicarial Bishop of Zaraysk, vicar to the Moscow Eparchy, in November 1965. He was consecrated on December 25, 1965 in the Trinity Church of the Alexander Nevsky Lavra in Leningrad. In 1969 he was made Bishop of Tula and assistant of the Russian Orthodox Church's department of External Relations. He was elevated to the archbishop dignity in 1971 and to the metropolitan dignity the following year. He was made Metropolitan of Krutitsy and Kolomna in 1977.

On November 30, 1987, Metropolitan Yuvenali took part to the Social Committee for International Cooperation in the Field of Humanitarian Issues and Human Rights, which was established (November 30, 1987) within the framework of the Soviet Committee for European Security and Cooperation. It was part of the Gorbachev's Perestroika that affirmed to promote the Helsinki Agreement and the freedom of religion independently from the Western civic groups of activists for human rights.
