= Philip II, Metropolitan of Moscow =

Metropolitan of Moscow from 1566 to 1568

Philip II
- Metropolitan of Moscow and all Russia
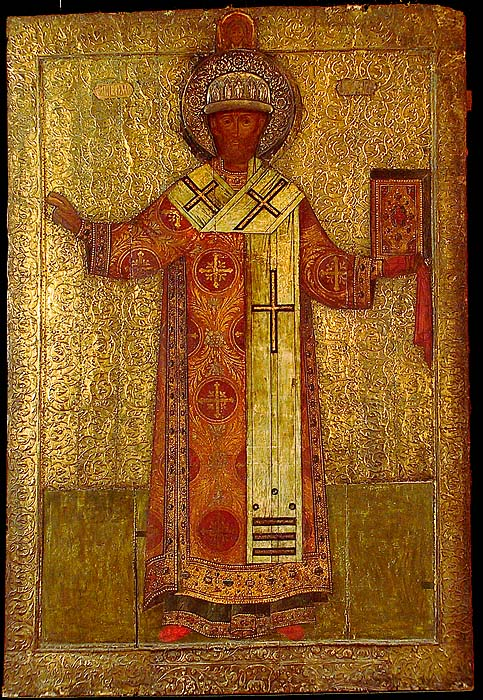
- Icon of St. Philip by Simon Ushakov
- Church: Russian Orthodox Church
- See: Moscow
- Installed: 1566
- Term ended: 1568
- Predecessor: Athanasius
- Successor: Cyril

Saint Philip, Metropolitan of Moscow
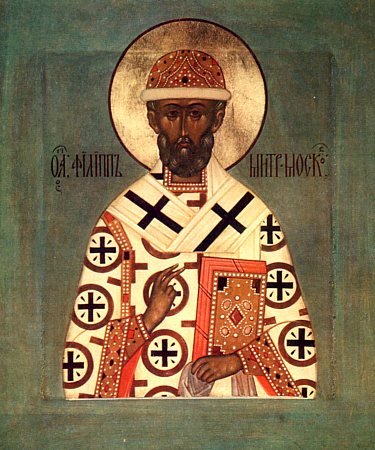
- Icon of St. Philip, Metropolitan of Moscow (Trapeza of the Trinity-St. Sergius Lavra)

Hieromartyr
- Born: 11 February 1507; Moscow, Russia
- Died: 23 December 1569 (aged 62); Tver, Russia
- Venerated in: Eastern Orthodox Church, Catholic Church
- Canonized: 1652 by Russian Orthodox Church
- Major shrine: Dormition Cathedral, Moscow
- Feast: 9 January (primary feast day); 3 July (translation of his relics); 5 October (Synaxis of the Hierarchs of Moscow)
- Attributes: Vested as a hierarch with omophorion, holding a Gospel Book, with his right hand raised in blessing. Iconographically, he is depicted with a medium sized dark beard with flecks of grey.

Saint Philip II of Moscow (Russian: Филипп II; born Fyodor Stepanovich Kolychov; Russian: Фёдор Степанович Колычёв; 11 February 1507 – 23 December 1569) was Metropolitan of Moscow and all Rus', the primate of the Russian Orthodox Church, from 1566 to 1568. He was the thirteenth metropolitan of Moscow to be appointed without the approval of the Ecumenical Patriarch of Constantinople as had been the norm.

He was one of a few metropolitans who dared to openly contradict Ivan the Terrible. It is widely believed that the tsar had him murdered on that account. He is venerated as a saint and martyr in the Eastern Orthodox Church.

== Biography ==
Fyodor Stepanovich Kolychov was born in Moscow into the old roots Moscow boyar family of Kolychevs, descendants of Andrei Aleksandrovich Kobyla, one of the noblest families of Muscovy. Grand Prince Vasili III took young Theodore into the royal court. It is said that since childhood Theodore was on friendly terms with Tsarevich Ivan, later Tsar Ivan IV of Russia ("the Terrible").

According to other accounts, he was involved in the conspiracy of Prince Andrey of Staritsa against Elena Glinskaya and, when their plans were discovered, he escaped to Solovetsky Monastery on the White Sea. Yet another account says that his decision to become a monk occurred on Sunday, 5 June 1537, while he was standing in church for the Divine Liturgy, on hearing the words of Jesus: "No man can serve two masters" (Matthew 6:24). According to this account, he secretly left Moscow dressed as peasant, and for a while he hid himself away from the world in the village of Khizna, near Lake Onega, earning his livelihood as a shepherd, later joining the monastery at Solovetsk. At any rate, he entered the monastery at Solovki at the age of 30, and a year and a half later he took monastic vows, receiving the religious name of Philip. In the monastery he worked at the iron forge and as a baker.

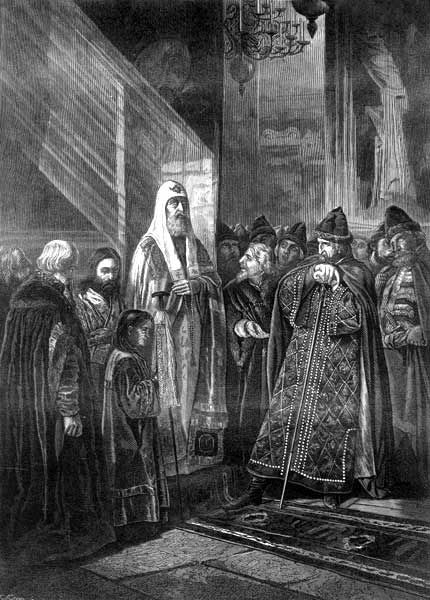
Metropolitan Philip confronting Ivan the Terrible (drawing by Vasili Pukirev, 1875).

11 years later, Philip was made hegumen (abbot) of the monastery. During his term in office, the monks constructed two cathedrals, a brickyard, many water-mills and storehouses, and a network of canals connecting 72 lakes. They also built a hospital. It is said that Philip took part in all these toils together with other monks. As a result, the monastery experienced a spiritual revival. He also adopted a new monastic rule (typicon) for the community. Most of Philip's projects in Solovki survive to this day.

The tsar heard about the indefatigable monk and asked him to fill the vacant metropolitan see of Moscow. Philip agreed on condition that Ivan would abolish the oprichnina. On 25 July 1566 Philip was consecrated a bishop and enthroned as Metropolitan of Moscow and all Russia.

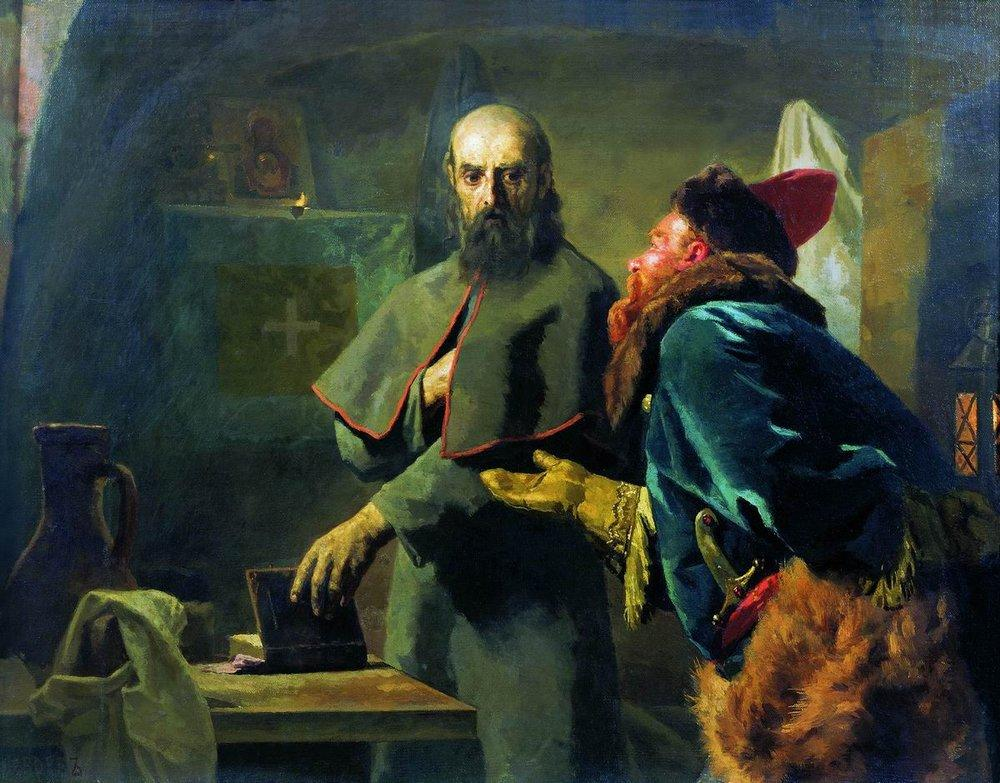
Malyuta Skuratov approaching Metropolitan Philip in order to kill him (painting by Nikolai Nevrev, 1898).

After only two years, however, Ivan the Terrible persisted with committing murders under the aegis of the oprichnina. During the Great Lent, on the Sunday of the Veneration of the Cross, 2 March 1568, when the Tsar came to the cathedral for Divine Liturgy, Philip refused to bless him and publicly rebuked him for the ongoing massacre. The Massacre of Novgorod ensued, and Philip's condemnation followed.

Ivan eventually deposed Philip from office by raising incredible charges of sorcery and dissolute living. Philip was arrested during Liturgy at the Cathedral of Dormition and imprisoned in a dingy cell of the Epiphany Monastery, fettered with chains, with a heavy collar around his neck, and was deprived of food for a few days in succession. Then he was transferred and immured at the Monastery of the Fathers (Otroch Monastery) at Tver. In November 1568, the tsar summoned the Holy Synod, which had Philip deposed. A year later, on 23 December 1569, he was strangled by the tsar's minion, Malyuta Skuratov at Otroch, two days before Christmas. As if aware of his approaching death, Philip had asked to receive Holy Communion three days earlier.

== Commemoration ==
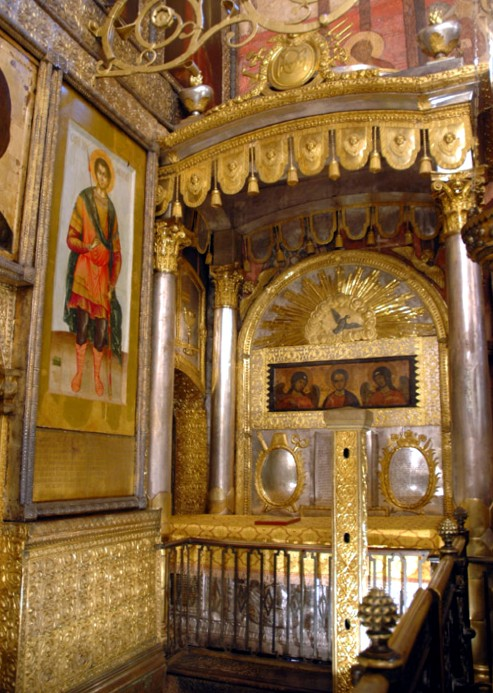
Reliquary of Philip II in the Dormition Cathedral

After his martyrdom, monks from Solovki Monastery asked for permission to transfer the body of St. Philip to their monastery. When they opened up the tomb they found the body of the hierarch was incorrupt, and various healings began to be reported. The transfer of his remains from Tver to the Solovki Monastery took place in 1590.

In 1652, Patriarch Nikon persuaded Tsar Alexis to bring Philip's relics to Moscow, where he was glorified (proclaimed a saint) later that same year. His memory is celebrated three times a year:

- His main feast day falls on 9 January (for those churches which follow the traditional Julian Calendar, 9 January falls on 22 January of the modern Gregorian Calendar).
- The feast of the translation of his relics is celebrated on 3 July (16 July).
- On 5 October (18 October) he is celebrated as one of the Hierarchs of Moscow. The celebration of a special day (Synaxis) to honor Saints Peter, Alexis, and Jonah as "Metropolitans and Wonderworkers of All Russia" was established by Patriarch Job in 1596. In 1875, St. Innocent, Metropolitan of Moscow proposed that St. Philip be included with the others.

== In popular culture ==
- Ivan the Terrible, a 1945 film directed by Sergei Eisenstein
- Tsar, a 2009 drama film directed by Pavel Lungin

== Sources ==
- "Филипп, митрополит московский и всея Руси" . Brockhaus and Efron Encyclopedic Dictionary (in Russian). 1906.
- Attwater, Donald and Catherine Rachel John. The Penguin Dictionary of Saints. 3rd edition. New York: Penguin Books, 1993. ISBN 0-14-051312-4

Eastern Orthodox Church titles
| Preceded by Athanasius | Metropolitan of Moscow and all Rus'; 1566–1568 | Succeeded by Cyril |
