= Seraphim Nikitin =

Seraphim (Nikitin)
- Born: 2 July 1905; St. Petersburg, Russian Empire
- Died: 22 April 1979 (aged 73); Leningrad, USSR

Metropolitan Seraphim (Russian: Митрополит Серафим; born Vladimir Mironovich Nikitin, Russian: Владимир Миронович Никитин; 2 July 1905 - 22 April 1979) was a Bishop of the Russian Orthodox Church, Metropolitan of Krutitsy and Kolomna.

== Biography ==
Born in St. Petersburg in the family servant. In 1928 he graduated from the State Institute of Architecture.

During World War II he served in the Soviet Army.

In November 1951 he was ordained deacon and then priest in the appointment of the Transfiguration Cathedral in Leningrad. As a member of the building committee of the Leningrad diocese. In 1958 he graduated from the correspondence section of the Leningrad Theological Academy with the title of Candidate of Theology.

On 26 June 1962 he was tonsured a monk with the name Seraphim in the Pskov-Caves Monastery, and on July 1 of the same year was elevated to the rank of Archimandrite.

From 8 to 27 February 1968 he served as temporary administrator of the diocese of Voronezh.

On 25 February 1968 he was elevated to the rank of archbishop. He was a member of the Synod Commission for the preparation of the Local Council of the Russian Orthodox Church in 1971. Chairman of the Economic Department of the Moscow Patriarchate from 25 August 1970 to 29 July 1974.

On 25 June 1971 Archbishop of Kursk and Belgorod appointed Metropolitan Seraphim Krutitsy and Kolomna, a permanent member of the Holy Synod.

On 11 June 1977 he was dismissed to rest, according to the petition, due to deteriorating health.

He died during the night of 22 April 1979, the feast of Easter in the Holy Transfiguration Cathedral in Leningrad (near which he lived and which used to come to pray in the last years of his life) during the Divine Liturgy.
