= 1990 Local Council of the Russian Orthodox Church =

- 7–8 June 1990
- Registered: 317 delegates
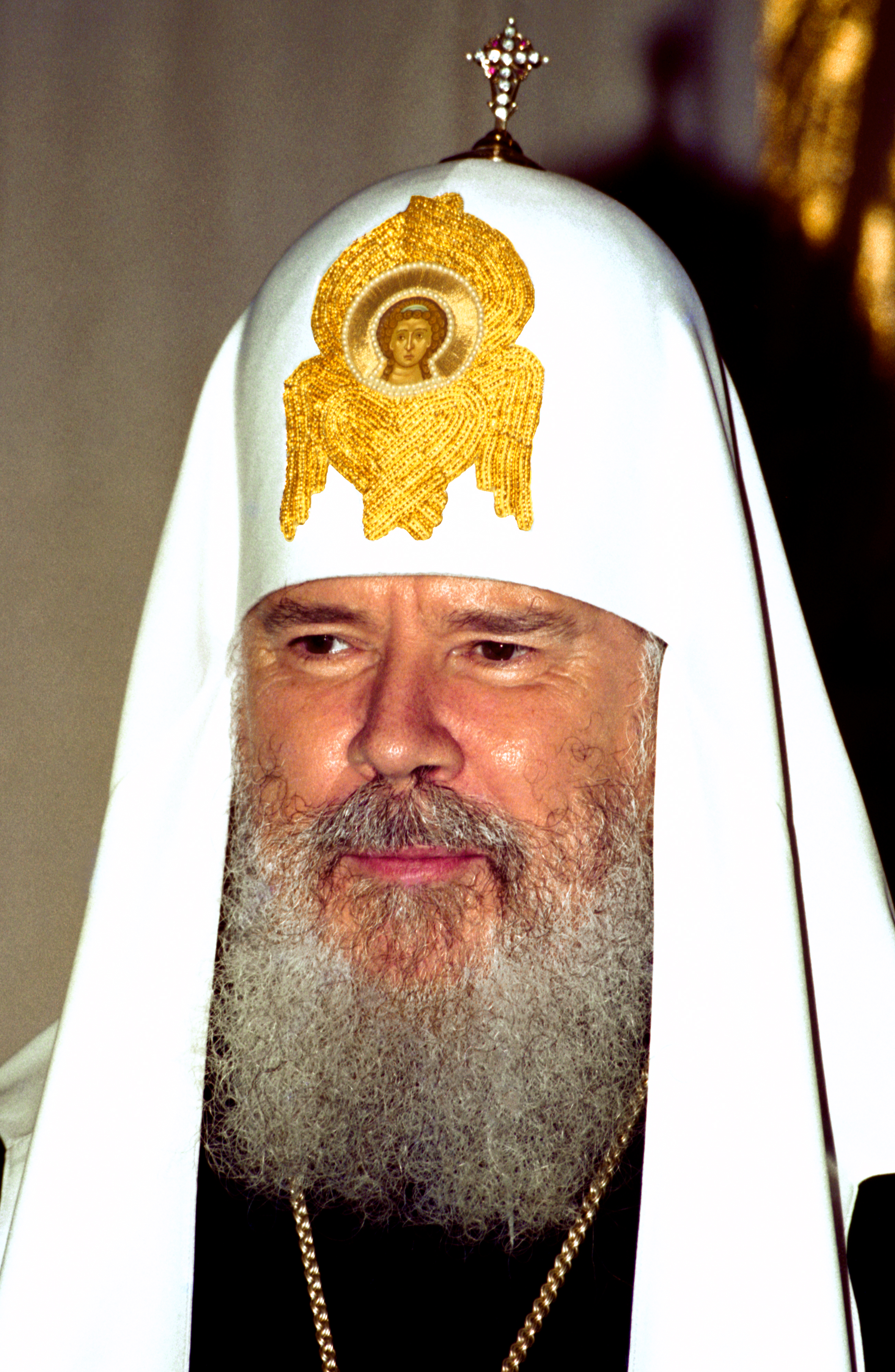

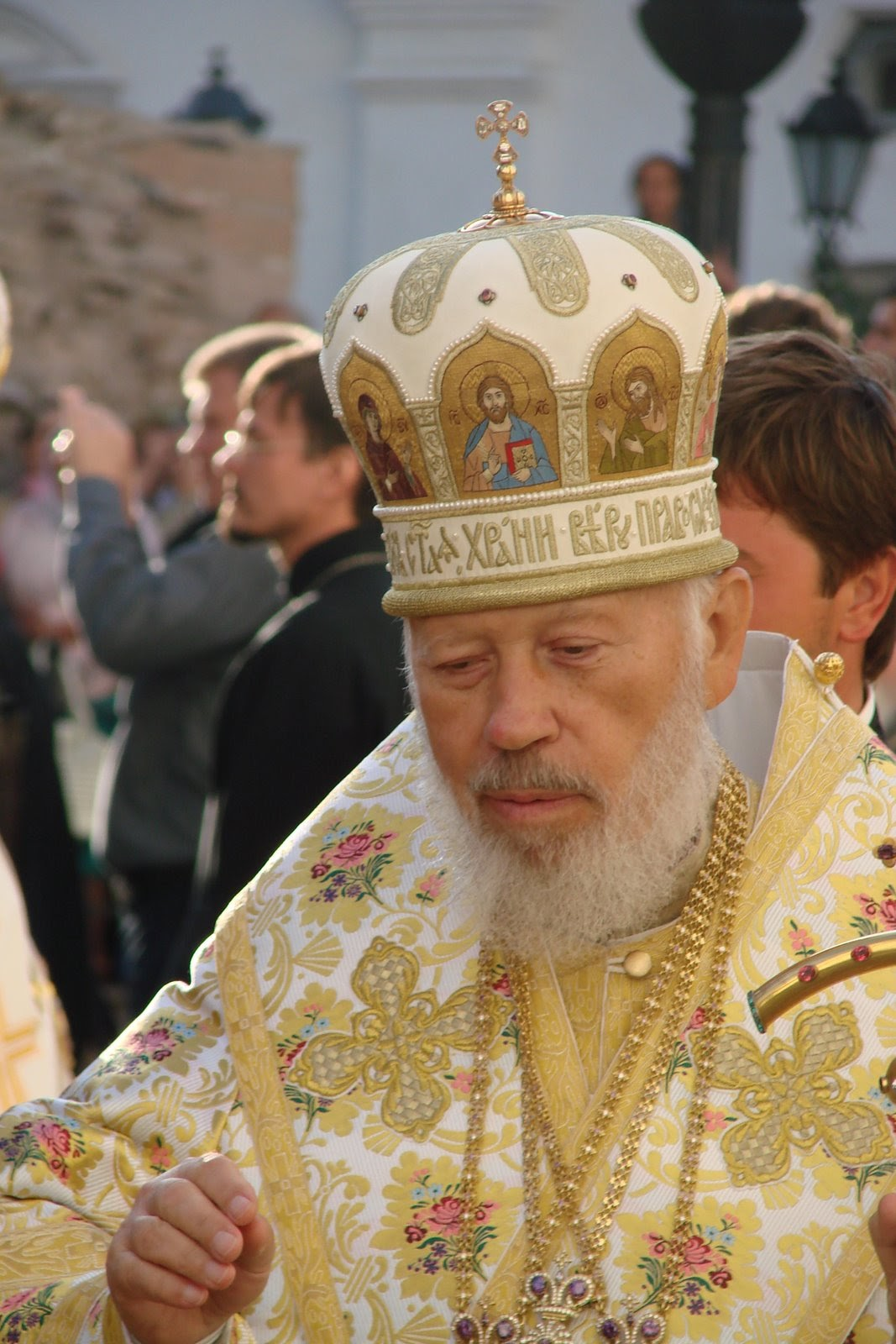

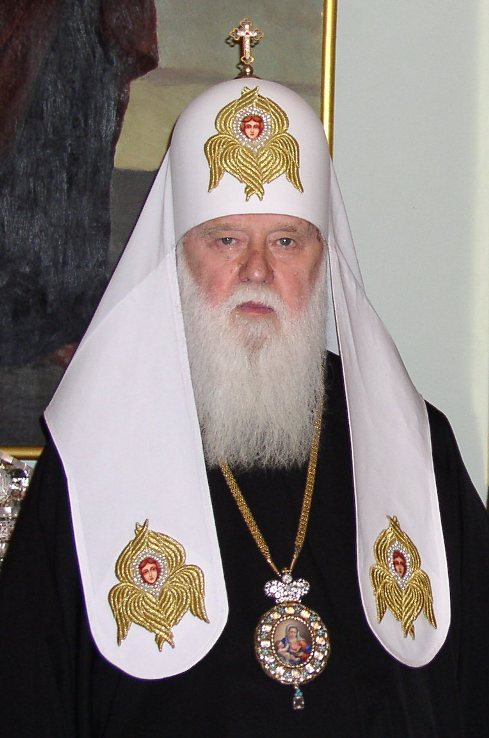
Nominee	Alexy (Ridiger)	Vladimir (Sabodan)	Filaret (Denysenko)
Electoral vote (first ballot)	139	107	66
Percentage (first ballot)	44.55%	34.29%	21.15%
Electoral vote (second ballot)	166	143	eliminated
Percentage (second ballot)	53.72%	46.28%
Metropoly	Leningrad and Novgorod	Rostov and Novocherkassk	Kiev and Galicia
Patriarch of Moscow and all Rus' before election
Pimen
Filaret (locum tenens)
Elected Patriarch of Moscow and all Rus'
Alexy II

The 1990 Local Council of the Russian Orthodox Church was a convocation of the Russian Orthodox Local Council. It took place from 7–8 June 1990 at the Trinity Lavra of St. Sergius. It was the fifth Local Council in the history of the Russian Orthodox Church in its second patriarchal period (since 1917)

The council elected the 15th Patriarch of Moscow and All Rus', Metropolitan Alexy of Leningrad and Novgorod (Ridiger) and canonized confessors, martyrs, and righteous men, including John of Kronstadt. Notable issues discussed by the council included relations with the Russian Orthodox Church Abroad, combating the rise of the Ukrainian Autocephalous Orthodox Church in Western Ukraine, and relations with the state.

== Background ==
Upon the death of Patriarch Pimen I of Moscow on 3 May 1990, a meeting of the Holy Synod was held in accordance with the Charter on the Governance of the Russian Orthodox Church, adopted in 1988 during the 1988 Local Council.

On 7 May, the Holy Synod issued a resolution to convene a Local Council from 6–10 June to elect the next Patriarch of Moscow and all Rus' and formed a commission to prepare the Council, headed by the Locum Tenens. The synod waited until a 26 May diocesan meeting to elect delegates to the Council according to the following quota: one cleric and layman from each diocese, and one representative from each monastery, theological academy, and seminary. Per the charter, all bishops are members of the Local Council.

Archpriest Vladislav Tsypin, responding to a question on whether the government was trying to influence the Council, said:

At the preparatory stage, the Council for Religious Affairs probably tried to interfere and exert influence. It can be assumed [...] that the election of the locum tenens [...] was under some influence of the Council for Religious Affairs, but by the time the Local Council was convened, everything suggests that this influence had not manifested itself in any way.

—

== Bishops' Council meeting ==
On 6 June, the Bishops' Council of the Russian Orthodox Church opened at the Patriarchal residence in the Danilov Monastery to discuss the proposed agenda of the Local Council. The Bishops' Council elected three candidates for the Patriarchal throne and ruled that the Local Council could supplement the number of candidates. Of the 92 bishops of the Russian Orthodox Church, 75 were potential candidates; the charter disqualified any bishop under the age of 40 and or who was not a Soviet citizen. Each bishop could vote for one, two, or three bishops, crossing the rest off the list.

Metropolitan Alexy of Leningrad (37 votes) and Metropolitan Vladimir (Sabodan) of Rostov (34 votes) were elected by secret ballot in the first round. A second round took place because Metropolitan Philaret (Denysenko) of Kiev and Metropolitan Juvenal (Poyarkov) of Krutitsy and Kolomna received 25 votes each. The second round resulted in the election of Metropolitan Philaret by a one-vote margin (34 against 33, excluding invalid ballots).

== Meeting ==
=== 7 June ===
The Local Council opened on 7 June with a Divine Liturgy at the Holy Trinity Cathedral of St. Sergius Lavra. The sessions of the Council were held in the Refectory Church of St Sergius, and 317 delegates participated in them: 90 bishops (Metropolitan Leonid (Polyakov) of Riga and Archbishop Seraphim (Rodionov) of Zurich were unable to attend due to illness), 92 clergy, 88 laymen (including 38 women), 39 representatives from monasteries, and 8 delegates from theological schools. Forty members of the Council represented the foreign dioceses of the Russian Orthodox Church.

At the beginning of the first hour of the day, the Locum Tenens of the Patriarchal throne, Philaret (Denisenko), delivered an introductory speech, in which he touched on the topic of church unity:

The main thing we pray for today is our unity. [...] The thousand-year history of the Russian Church, the two-thousand-year experience of the Ecumenical Orthodoxy, clearly testify that the deviation from the purity of faith and the fullness of Tradition leads only to unrest and schisms that tear apart the seamless robe of Christ. May the Lord enlighten all those who seek human glory, and not the glory of God - their own earthly well-being, and not sacrificial service to the Church of Christ.

A greeting was delivered by the Chairman of the Council for Religious Affairs, Yuri Khristoradnov, on behalf of the Soviet government, then the presiding Metropolitan Filaret read a report and proposed to the Council for voting and approval of the agenda, regulations, and election procedure, the drafts of which had been distributed to the delegates immediately before, as well as the composition of the presidium, secretariat, mandate, editorial, and counting commissions.

The report of the Patriarchal Locum Tenens spoke of the need for the new Patriarch to quickly assume control of the Russian Orthodox Church in order to resolve pressing problems presented the activities of the late Patriarch Pimen, mentioned the past celebration of the 1000th anniversary of the Christianization of Rus', the glorification of John of Kronstadt, and the changes that had occurred since the Local Council of 1988. He paid special attention to the situation that had developed in the Church in Western Ukraine, where, according to him, peace had been disrupted by the actions of the Ukrainian Greek Catholic Church and the Ukrainian Autocephalous Orthodox Church, and condemned the decision of the Bishops' Council of the Russian Orthodox Church Outside of Russia to establish its own (parallel to the ROC) church structures within the USSR was condemned.

The most important act of the first day of the Local Council was the election of the Patriarch. The Local Council approved the election procedure proposed by the Bishops' Council:

1. The Local Council approves, by secret or open vote, a list of three candidates proposed by the Bishops' Council for election from among them as the Patriarch of Moscow and all Rus'.
2. The Local Council has the right to add additional names to this list, guided by Chapter 4, § 17, paragraphs a-e of the Charter on the Governance of the Russian Orthodox Church.
3. To include additional persons in the list of candidates, a secret ballot is to be held: persons who have received the support of at least 12 members of the Local Council are included in the ballot.
4. The Local Council, by secret ballot, elects one of the candidates approved by it.
5. The bishop who has received more than 50% of the votes is considered elected Patriarch.
6. If none of the candidates has received more than 50% of the votes, then a repeat vote is held between the two candidates who have received the greatest number of votes.

In addition to the three candidates from the Bishops' Council, the following metropolitans were proposed as candidates at the Local Council: Juvenal (Poyarkov), Philaret (Vakhromeyev), Pitirim (Nechayev), Gedeon (Dokukin), and Anthony (Bloom). Metropolitan Philaret Denisenko rejected the candidacy of Metropolitan Anthony, recalling that the Charter does not allow the election of a person who does not have Soviet citizenship as patriarch. When the members of the Council proposed changing this point of the Charter, they were told that there was no such point on the agenda that had just been adopted by vote. During the open vote for the four additional candidates, it turned out that less than 12 people supported Metropolitan Gideon, so the names of only three metropolitans were included in the lists for secret voting. Of the 316 voters, Metropolitan Pitirim was supported by 128 members of the Council, Metropolitan Philaret by 117, and Metropolitan Juvenaly by 106. The question arose whether this half should be counted from all voters (316/2 = 158, and then none of the three will pass) or from the number of valid ballots (215/2 = 107.5, and then two more metropolitans are added to the three candidates from the Bishops' Council). This nuance was not taken into account, but Metropolitan Philaret of Kiev announced that none of the additionally nominated candidates received the support of half of the members of the Council. Thus, the three candidates nominated by the Bishops' Council remained on the voting list.

Archbishop Maxim (Krokha) of Mogilev proposed not to vote for candidates, but to elect the patriarch by lot, following the example of the Local Council of 1917. The chairman supported this proposal, but it was not accepted, as it was not supported by the council members. A participant of the council, Archbishop Kirill of Smolensk and Kaliningrad (later Metropolitan and Patriarch) explained the reason for this choice in an interview:

The control of the authorities [during the USSR] was strict and, of course, at that time it was unthinkable for the patriarch to be elected secretly... But in 1988, changes began, and the changes began radically. And at that turning point, in no case should we have drawn lots. Because it was necessary for the entire council to identify itself with this choice. And for His Holiness the Patriarch to know this conscious support of the church. And this gives the primate enormous authority.

—

A secret vote was held. In the evening, the chairman of the counting commission, Metropolitan Anthony of Sourozh, announced the results of the secret ballot: 139 votes were cast for Metropolitan Alexy of Leningrad and Novgorod, 107 for Metropolitan Vladimir of Rostov and Novocherkassk, and 66 for Metropolitan Philaret of Kyiv and Galicia.

The final meeting opened at 10 p.m.. In the second round, 166 members of the Council voted for Metropolitan Alexy and 143 for Metropolitan Vladimir, eight ballots were invalid. At 10:20 p.m., the bell of the Trinity Lavra of St. Sergius announced the election of the fifteenth Patriarch of Russia.

After the final results of the vote were announced, the newly elected patriarch responded to the question addressed to him by the chairman of the Council with the words required by the rite: "I accept with gratitude and do not say anything against my election by the consecrated Local Council of the Russian Orthodox Church as Patriarch of Moscow and all Rus'." The Council then drew up the "Council Act on the election of His Holiness the Patriarch" and the council charter addressed to him. All the bishops who were members of the Local Council signed both documents. At the end of the evening session, the senior archpastor of the Russian Church by ordination, Archbishop Leonty (Bondar) of Orenburg, addressed the newly elected Patriarch Alexy with congratulations: "By the power of the unity of the Holy Spirit, the Local Council of the Russian Orthodox Church has elected Your Holiness to the widowed throne as Patriarch of Moscow and All Rus', the fifteenth luminary of the All-Russian Patriarchal Throne. We rejoice together and with all our hearts and souls we greet Your Holiness. May the Patriarchate of Your Holiness be blessed for the Russian Orthodox Church and salvific for Your Holiness." In his response, Patriarch Alexy II thanked all the members of the Local Council for the election and congratulations and said:

I am aware of the difficulty and feat of the upcoming service. My life, which from my youth has been dedicated to serving the Church of Christ, is drawing to a close, but the Holy Council has entrusted me with the feat of serving as a primatial priest. I accept this election, but in the first minutes I ask the Most Reverend Archpastors, the honest clergy and the entire God-loving flock of all Russia to help me and strengthen me in my upcoming service with their prayers and assistance. Many questions arise today before the Church, before society and before each of us. And in solving them, we need conciliar reasoning, we need a joint decision and discussion of them both at Bishops' Councils and at Local Councils, in accordance with the charter adopted by our Church in 1988. The conciliar principle must extend to diocesan and parish life, only then will we resolve the questions that face the Church and society. Church activity is expanding today. The Church, each of its ministers, and church figures are expected to perform acts of mercy, charity, and education of the most diverse age groups of our believers. We must serve as a reconciling force, a unifying force, even when our lives are often accompanied by divisions. We must do everything to help strengthen the unity of the Holy Orthodox Church. I recognize my weakness and trust in your holy prayers and help in my upcoming ministry.

Almost until midnight, the participants of the Local Council approached the elected patriarch, bringing their congratulations. The first day of the Council's work ended with the singing of a thanksgiving service. Other issues were also raised on the first day, which were examined in detail on the second day.

=== 8 June ===
On 8 June, the meeting was opened by the new chairman of the Council, Metropolitan Alexy, elected as the Patriarch. At 12 p.m., the chairman of the Synodal Commission for the Canonization of Saints, Metropolitan Juvenaly of Krutitsy and Kolomna, presented a report on the canonization of Archpriest John of Kronstadt. Based on this report, the Council issued an act on the glorification of the righteous John of Kronstadt.

The drafts of the Council's definitions and messages, current issues of church life (the legal status of the Church, the unity of the Church and the schism in Ukraine, relations with the Church Outside of Russia) became the subject of long discussions. All the speeches on the second day in one way or another touched on the topic of the unity of the Church. The speech of the Archbishop German (Timofeev) of Berlin, devoted mainly to the relations between the Church and the state both in historical and legal terms and to the draft law on freedom of conscience, published on 5 June, was particularly notable:

The legislators have appropriated the right to substitute their own concepts for the believers' ideas about their Church and, for example, they stubbornly want to replace the monolithic hierarchical structure inherent in the Church with its congregational structure. In this way, they interfere with the internal life of the Church; they deliberately want to distort it and to enshrine this distortion in law.

In conclusion, Archbishop German spoke about the persecutions the Church had endured during the Soviet era, and raised the issue of canonizing the new martyrs. After Bishop German's speech, the first applause was heard at the Council. The Archbishops Kirill of Smolensk and Kaliningrad, Platon (Udovenko) of Yaroslavl and Rostov, and German of Berlin and Leipzig spoke on the draft of the new legislation. At the end of the day, the Council voted for the main theses of the appeal to the Supreme Council and the Council of Ministers of the USSR with three main wishes for the legislator: recognition of the legal rights of the Church as a whole, and not just its communities, granting the right to teach religious subjects in schools (optional), and recognition of the Church's right to own church buildings and other property, which at that time was only leased.

Much attention was paid to relations with the Russian Orthodox Church Outside of Russia. The first time this problem was raised was on 7 June by one of the lay delegates, who proposed to satisfy three demands of the Russian Orthodox Church Outside of Russia: canonization of the Council of New Martyrs and Confessors of Russia, condemnation of the declaration of Metropolitan Sergius (Stragorodsky) of 1927, and rejection of ecumenism. The relations with the ROCOR were the subject of speeches by Metropolitans Juvenaly (Poyarkov) of Krutitsy, Irenaeus (Susemihl) of Vienna, Archbishops Kirill of Smolensk, Pimen (Khmelevsky) of Saratov, Platon (Udovenko) of Yaroslavl, Archpriest Vasily Stoyanov, Priest Vitaly Shastin, Hieromonk Hilarion (Alfeyev), and others.

The decision of the Synod of the Russian Orthodox Church Outside of Russia on 16 May to create its own parishes and hierarchy on the territory of the Russian Orthodox Church was met with general condemnation. The participants of the Council qualified this decision as aimed at sowing unrest and a new schism and emphasized that it would stimulate the emergence of conflicts similar to the one in Suzdal, where Archimandrite Valentin (Rusantsov), who had entered into a canonical conflict with the bishop, announced his transfer to the jurisdiction of the ROCOR. Archbishop Platon proposed to address a pastoral word to all Orthodox Russian people under the jurisdiction of the "Karlovac Church" in order to "somehow bring them to their senses." In conclusion, Archbishop Kirill of Smolensk said:

We have no demands on the "Karlovac" Church, we are ready to begin full communion right now, because we believe that the division was based on historical, political factors, and not canonical or theological ones (if they were canonical, they were conditioned by the political situation). These factors mainly concern the interpretation of history, and it has never been something that divides the Churches. […] dissatisfaction… has given rise to a romantic and nostalgic attitude towards the Church Outside of Russia in part of our society. A simple principle applies here: it is good where we are not… By its nature, this mood is not bad: it could also become a source of inspiration for communion between the two parts of the divided Church. But, unfortunately, some events have brought new drama to these relations. First of all, we are talking about the actions of Archimandrite Valentin (Rusantsov)… It has always been like this in the Church: the unstable ones went into schism. […] The political schism, which has so far been the property of the diaspora, is now being transferred to the depths of our Church at a time when the Church has new opportunities, when the whole society turns to face us. […] Every schism is nourished by unhealthy forces in the Church. And if there are as few unhealthy forces as possible in our Church, the less prospects this schism will have… The parishes of the Church Outside of Russia, if they open here, can turn into a sewer where all unhealthy elements will go. I do not want to characterize Archimandrite Valentin (Rusantsov) here, but I think that most of those present know what kind of person he is…

== Literature ==
- Никитин Д. Н. Поместный собор Русской Православной Церкви 1990 г. // Православная энциклопедия. — М., 2020. — Т. LVII : «Погановская икона Божьей Матери — Православное обозрение». — С. 417–421.
