= Cyril, Metropolitan of Moscow =

Metropolitan of Moscow from 1568 to 1572

Cyril
- Metropolitan of Moscow and all Russia
- Church: Russian Orthodox Church
- See: Moscow
- Installed: 1568
- Term ended: 1572
- Predecessor: Philip II
- Successor: Anthony

Personal details
- Born: 1492
- Died: 8 March 1572 (aged 79–80)

Cyril IV (Russian: Кирилл; died 8 February 1572) was Metropolitan of Moscow and all Rus', the primate of the Russian Orthodox Church, from 1568 to 1572. He was the fourteenth metropolitan in Moscow to be appointed without the approval of the Ecumenical Patriarch of Constantinople as had been the norm.

== Biography ==
There is not much information on Cyril and his deeds. In 1566, Cyril was appointed archmandrite at the Troitse-Sergiyeva Lavra. On 11 November 1568, he was elected metropolitan in favor of the recently deposed Metropolitan Philip.

During Cyril's term, Ivan the Terrible's fierceness reached its climax. In 1571, a Crimean khan Devlet I Giray attacked Moscow and ravaged the city. Metropolitan Cyril had to hide in the Cathedral of the Dormition in the Moscow Kremlin to avoid death. It was Cyril who had asked Ivan IV not to execute Ivan Mstislavsky, accused of bringing the Tatars to the capital.

Metropolitan Cyril died on 8 February 1572, and was interred at the Novinsky Monastery.

== Sources ==
- "Кирилл IV" . Brockhaus and Efron Encyclopedic Dictionary (in Russian). 1906.

Eastern Orthodox Church titles
Preceded by Philip II	Metropolitan of Moscow and all Rus'; 1568–1572	Succeeded by Anthony
