= Anthony, Metropolitan of Moscow =

Metropolitan of Moscow from 1572 to 1581

Anthony
- Metropolitan of Moscow and all Russia
- Church: Russian Orthodox Church
- See: Moscow
- Installed: 1572
- Term ended: 1581
- Predecessor: Cyril
- Successor: Dionysius

Personal details
- Born: 1501
- Died: 1581 (aged 79–80)

Anthony (Russian: Антоний; 1501–1581) was Metropolitan of Moscow and all Rus', the primate of the Russian Orthodox Church, from 1572 to 1581. He was the fifteenth metropolitan in Moscow to be appointed without the approval of the Ecumenical Patriarch of Constantinople as had been the norm.

== Biography ==
Very little is known of Anthony's life prior to being named metropolitan. From 1568 to his appointment as metropolitan, he was the archbishop of Polotsk and Velikiye Luki. He was appointed as the metropolitan by Ivan the Terrible.

Anthony's tenure was sometimes difficult, as Ivan, in addition to setting up the oprichnina and engaging in a number of wars that significantly harmed Muscovite society, set about attacking the church during his reign.

In 1573 and 1580, Anthony convened church councils to deal with monastic landholdings, probably tied to Ivan's efforts since the 1550s to secularize monastic lands, an effort that was checked by the Stoglav Council in 1551.

In 1575, Ivan executed several boyars and okolnichi as well as a number of important ecclesiastics in Cathedral Square in the Moscow Kremlin; among them were Archbishop Pimen of Novgorod and Archimandrite Evstafii of the Chudov Monastery. The heads of the archbishop and archimandrite along with several other churchmen were thrown into the courtyard of the metropolitan's palace, either as a warning to Anthony or as a suggestion that he was somehow tied to or responsible for their fate.

Anthony died in the beginning of 1581.

Eastern Orthodox Church titles
Preceded by Cyril	Metropolitan of Moscow and all Rus'; 1572–1581	Succeeded by Dionysius
