= Ignatius of Moscow =

Patriarch of Moscow (1605–1606)

Ignatius
- Patriarch of Moscow and all Rus'
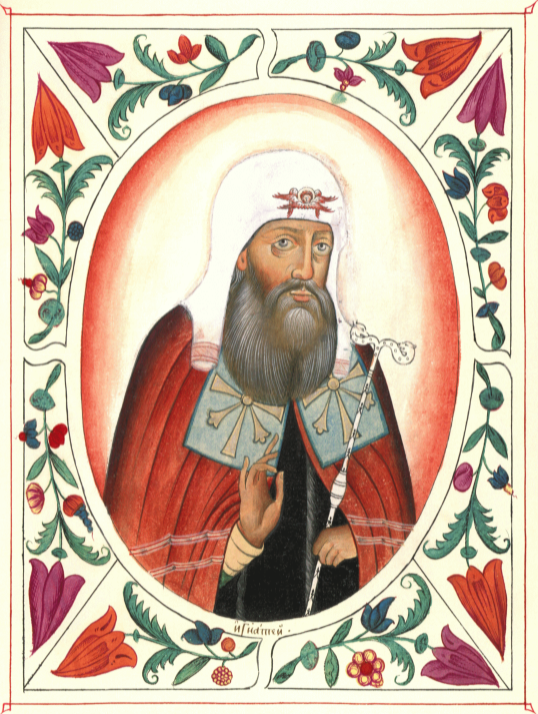
- Portrait in the Tsarsky titulyarnik, 1672
- Church: Russian Orthodox Church (Later Eastern Catholic)
- See: Moscow
- Installed: 30 June 1605
- Term ended: 1606
- Predecessor: Job
- Successor: Hermogenes

Personal details
- Born: c. 1540 Crete
- Died: c. 1620
- Buried: Holy Trinity Church of the Basilian Monastery, Vilnius

Ignatius (Russian: Игнатий, Greek: Ιγνάτιος) (1540–1620) was a Russian Orthodox bishop of Greek descent who was the second Patriarch of Moscow and All Russia in 1605–1606, even though his status is now disputed and he is frequently omitted from the list of Patriarchs of Moscow by the Russian Orthodox Church.

Ignatius was reported to be of Cretan descent. He came to Russia in 1595 as a member of an ecclesiastic mission, sent by the Patriarch of Constantinople. He took part in the coronation of Boris Godunov. In the early 17th century, Ignatius was appointed Archbishop of Ryazan. After the death of Godunov, he expressed support to False Dmitriy I and, even before the pretender reached Moscow, was swearing in his supporters in Tula. On 30 June 1605, Ignatius was elected patriarch by the council of bishops to replace Patriarch Job, who was sent into exile for refusing to acknowledge the pretender's rights for Russian throne. Ignatius performed the coronation of False Dmitriy I on 21 July 1605 and later also celebrated the coronation of his wife Marina Mnishek and their marriage. At that time, Ignatius was also an ardent opponent of the Unia.

After the assassination of False Dmitriy I, Ignatius was removed from his see and confined in the Chudov Monastery by the order of Tsar Vasili IV. In 1610, patriarch Ignatius supported False Dmitriy II. In April this year the patriarch Hermogen, consistently calling on the Russians to participate to arms and the expulsion of the Poles from the country was thrown into prison in the Chudov Monastery. His duties were taken over, this time without the confirmation of this fact by the council, by Ignatius. But the latter did not want to remain in the civil war-stricken Russia and 27 December 1611, made an attempt to escape from Moscow. In the vicinity of Smolensk, Ignatius was assaulted, robbed, and then stopped in the Polish camp outside the city. Polish King Sigismund III Vasa hoped that in the future will be able to renew war with Russia, and intended to use the former patriarch person Ignatius was taken to Vilnius and settled in the Holy Trinity Church of the Basilian Monastery. At that time he also converted from Russian Orthodoxy ("the Disunia") to Byzantine Rite Catholicism ("the Unia"), thus entering into full communion with the Pope.

The date of the death of Ignatius traditionally were positioned around 1640, but in more recent studies mentioned much earlier years 1618 or 1619. The clergyman was buried in the church of the Holy Trinity in the Basilian monastery in Vilnius. His remains were probably removed from the tomb and exported out of the city by the Russian army after the capture of Vilnius in 1655.

Due to his active role in the installation of False Dmitriy I to the Moscow throne and later conversion to the Unia, Ignatius has suffered from damnatio memoriae in subsequent ages and often is not counted among the legitimate patriarchs by the Russian Orthodox Church. Even though his predecessor Patriarch Job was removed from his post by force, the legitimacy of Ignatius' election and his status as patriarch was not questioned by his contemporaries.

Eastern Orthodox Church titles
Preceded by St. Job	Patriarch of Moscow and all Russia; 1605–06	Succeeded by Germogen
