= Patriarch Job of Moscow =

Patriarch of Moscow from 1589 to 1605

Job
- Patriarch of Moscow and all Rus'
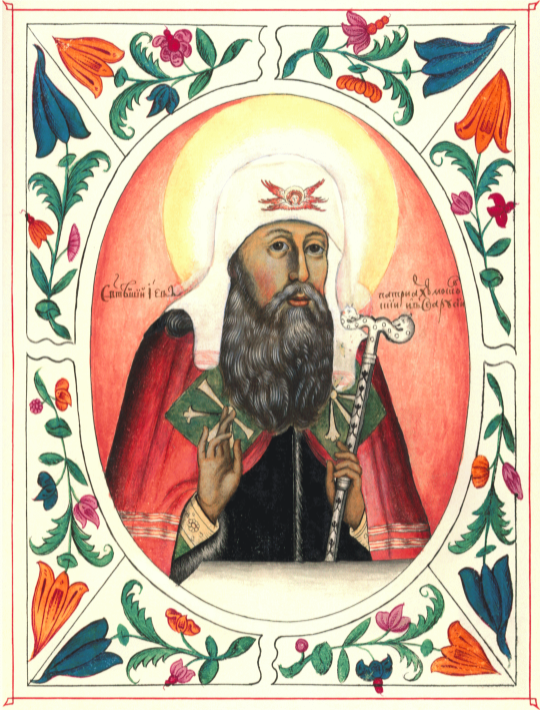
- Portrait in the Tsarsky titulyarnik, 1672
- Church: Russian Orthodox Church
- See: Moscow
- Installed: 26 January 1589
- Term ended: June 1605
- Predecessor: Dionysius (as metropolitan)
- Successor: Ignatius

Personal details
- Died: 19 June 1607 Staritsa, Russia
- Buried: Dormition Cathedral, Moscow

Job (Russian: И́ов, romanized: Iov; died 19 June 1607) was Metropolitan of Moscow and all Rus', the primate of the Russian Orthodox Church, from 1587 to 1589, and the first Patriarch of Moscow and all Rus' from 1589 to 1605.

He was the seventeenth metropolitan in Moscow to be appointed without the approval of the Ecumenical Patriarch of Constantinople as had been the norm. In 1589, Jeremias II, the patriarch of Constantinople, regularized Job's canonical status and raised him to the status of patriarch. 400 years later, the Russian Orthodox Church canonized him in 1989.

== Early life ==
He was born in the 1530s in the town of Staritsa.

His birth name was Ioann (Russian: Иоанн). As a teenager, Ioann knew most of the biblical texts by heart and strove to become a monk. His father, however, insisted that he marry. On his wedding day, Ioann asked his father's permission to see his confessor; upon his arrival, he immediately took monastic vows and assumed the religious name of Job.

== Career ==
=== Abbot and bishop ===
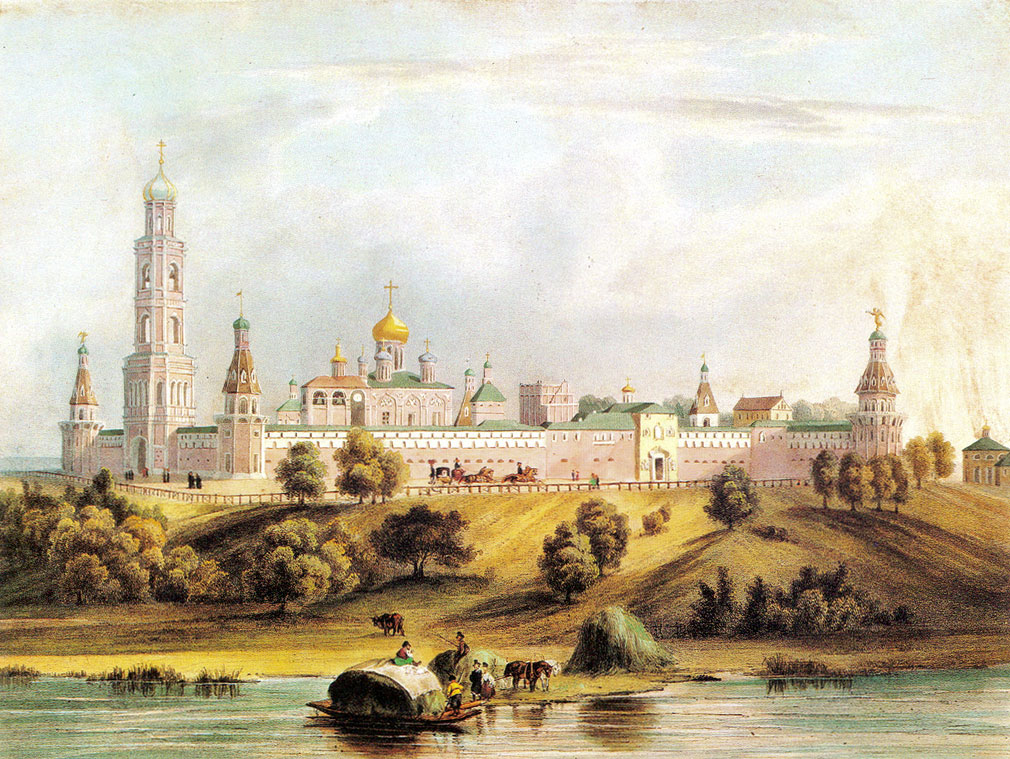
A 19th-century watercolour view of the Simonov monastery

Job spent fifteen years in the Uspensky Monastery and became its abbot in 1566 with the help of Ivan the Terrible, who had made Staritsa his residence during the time of the Oprichnina. According to Debra A. Coulter, "Job was known as a humble man of impeccable morals, learned for his times, who worked for the good of the church and the promotion of Orthodox Christianity."

In 1571, Job was transferred to Moscow and appointed abbot of the Simonov Monastery.

In 1575, he became the abbot of the Novospassky Monastery. In 1581, Job was consecrated as the bishop of Kolomna.

Though a person of mediocre mental abilities, he nevertheless managed to draw the attention of Boris Godunov by his talent for reading the longest of prayers by heart in a very expressive manner. During the reign of Feodor I (whose government was controlled by Boris Godunov), Job was appointed archbishop of Rostov and the metropolitan of Moscow and all Russia in 1587.

=== Patriarch of Moscow ===
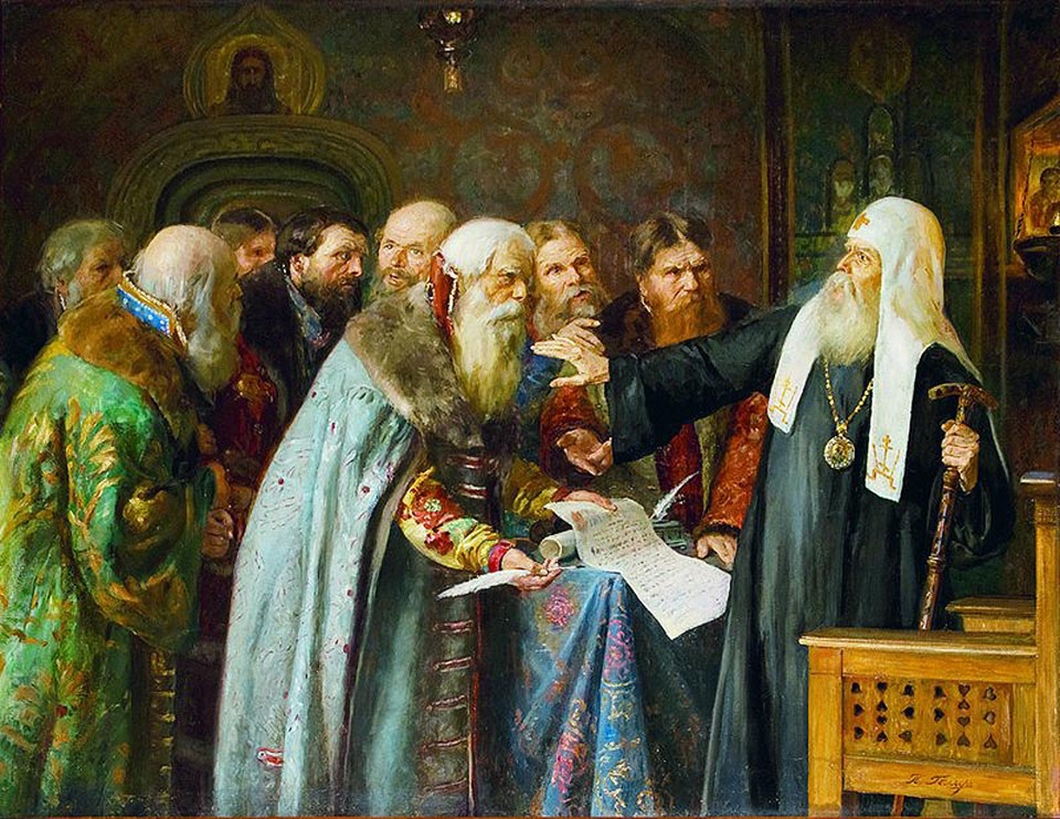
Patriarch Job refusing to recognize False Dmitry I as Ivan IV's son, 19th-century painting by Peter Geller

Arguing that ecclesiastic authority in Russia should be strengthened, Godunov managed to persuade Jeremias II, the patriarch of Constantinople, to establish a patriarchate in Moscow. On 5 February [O.S. 26 January] 1589, Job was consecrated as the first Russian patriarch with the blessing of Jeremias II. In the decree establishing the patriarchate, the whole Russian tsardom is called a "third Rome". As Feodor was poorly suited to ruling, the diplomacy was left to Godunov.

The residence of the patriarch was established in the Moscow Kremlin, in a building adjacent to the Church of the Twelve Apostles with Byzantine features. In 1590, a council held in Constantinople confirmed the new status of Moscow, and three years later, the four other Orthodox patriarchs ratified this at another council with the support of 42 bishops.

Job did not approve, however, of Godunov's proposal to open a university in Moscow staffed with foreign professors because he believed their influence and non-Orthodox faith would spread heterodoxy and endanger the purity of the Russian Church. Under Job's supervision, the Russian churchmen corrected books for the divine services and prepared them for publication.

He assisted in the glorification (canonization) of some of the Russian saints, ordering the celebration of the memory of Basil Fool for Christ in 1588, as well as that of Joseph Volotsky and others. Patriarch Job also favored the construction of new cathedrals and monasteries and Christian missionary activities in the recently conquered Astrakhan Khanate and Siberia. He also corresponded with Catholicos Nicholas V of Georgia and exchanged gifts with him. After the mysterious death of Tsarevich Dmitry Ivanovich in 1591, Job accepted the non-criminal version of his demise, supporting Boris Godunov every step of the way.

In 1591, he headed the official enquiry into the death of Tsarevich Dmitry in Uglich. After consulting with the church council and the duma of boyars, the patriarch announced his verdict – the tsarevich had accidentally stabbed himself and not been murdered. In that year he also founded the Donskoy Monastery in Moscow.

== Civil career ==
After the death of Tsar Feodor I and the refusal of his wife, Irina Godunova, to accept the throne, Patriarch Job became the head of state in 1598. As he was much obliged to Boris Godunov for his promotion to the post of patriarch, Job offered his candidature as tsar to the Land Assembly (Zemsky sobor). On 21 February 1598, he headed a religious procession to Boris Godunov at the Novodevichy Convent, imploring him to accept the throne.

Job was known as a harsh critic of False Dmitry I and he tried to persuade the people of Moscow to remain loyal to the deceased tsar. The armed supporters of the impostor burst into the Cathedral of the Dormition and a boyar named P. F. Basmanov declared Job a traitor. Job's formal removal from office was on 24 June 1605, when the council announced his retirement because of old age and ill health. The same council announced the grant of the dignity to the Patriarch Ignatius. Job was sent into exile to his monastery in Staritsa, where he went completely blind.

Job was succeeded by Archbishop Ignatius of Ryazan and only returned to Moscow following the murder of False Dmitry I, the imprisonment of Patriarch Ignatius at the Monastery of the Miracle and the accession of Vasili IV of Russia. On 20 February 1607, at the request of Tsar Vasili Shuisky, Patriarchs Hermogen and Job jointly celebrated the Holy Liturgy at the Dormition Cathedral in the Moscow Kremlin, where he forgave the people of Moscow and gave them his blessing.

== Death ==
He died in 1607. In 1652, his relics were transferred to the Cathedral of the Dormition of the Moscow Kremlin, where they remain to this day. Patriarch Job was glorified as a saint by the Russian Orthodox Church in 1989.

He is commemorated as part of the Synaxis of the Saints of Moscow (October 18), the Synaxis of the Saints of Tver (the first Sunday after the feast of Sts. Peter and Paul), and the Synaxis of the Rostov-Yaroslavl Saints (June 5).

== Sources ==
- "Иов, патриарх всероссийский" . Brockhaus and Efron Encyclopedic Dictionary (in Russian). 1906.
- Gavrilkin, Konstantin (3 February 2014). McGuckin, John Anthony (ed.). The Concise Encyclopedia of Orthodox Christianity. John Wiley & Sons. pp. 401–411. ISBN 978-1-118-75933-2.
- Kent, Neil (2021). A Concise History of the Russian Orthodox Church. Academica Press. ISBN 978-1-68053-907-3.
- Rock, Stella (17 August 2006). Angold, Michael (ed.). The Cambridge History of Christianity: Volume 5, Eastern Christianity. Cambridge University Press. pp. 253–275. ISBN 978-0-521-81113-2.

Eastern Orthodox Church titles
| Preceded by Dionysius | Metropolitan of Moscow and all Rus'; 1587–1589 | Succeeded by Metropolitan of Moscow was elevated to Patriarch |
| Preceded by Office created | Patriarch of Moscow and all Rus'; 1589–1605 | Succeeded by Ignatius |
