= Dormition Cathedral, Moscow =

Assumption Cathedral
- Успенский Собор
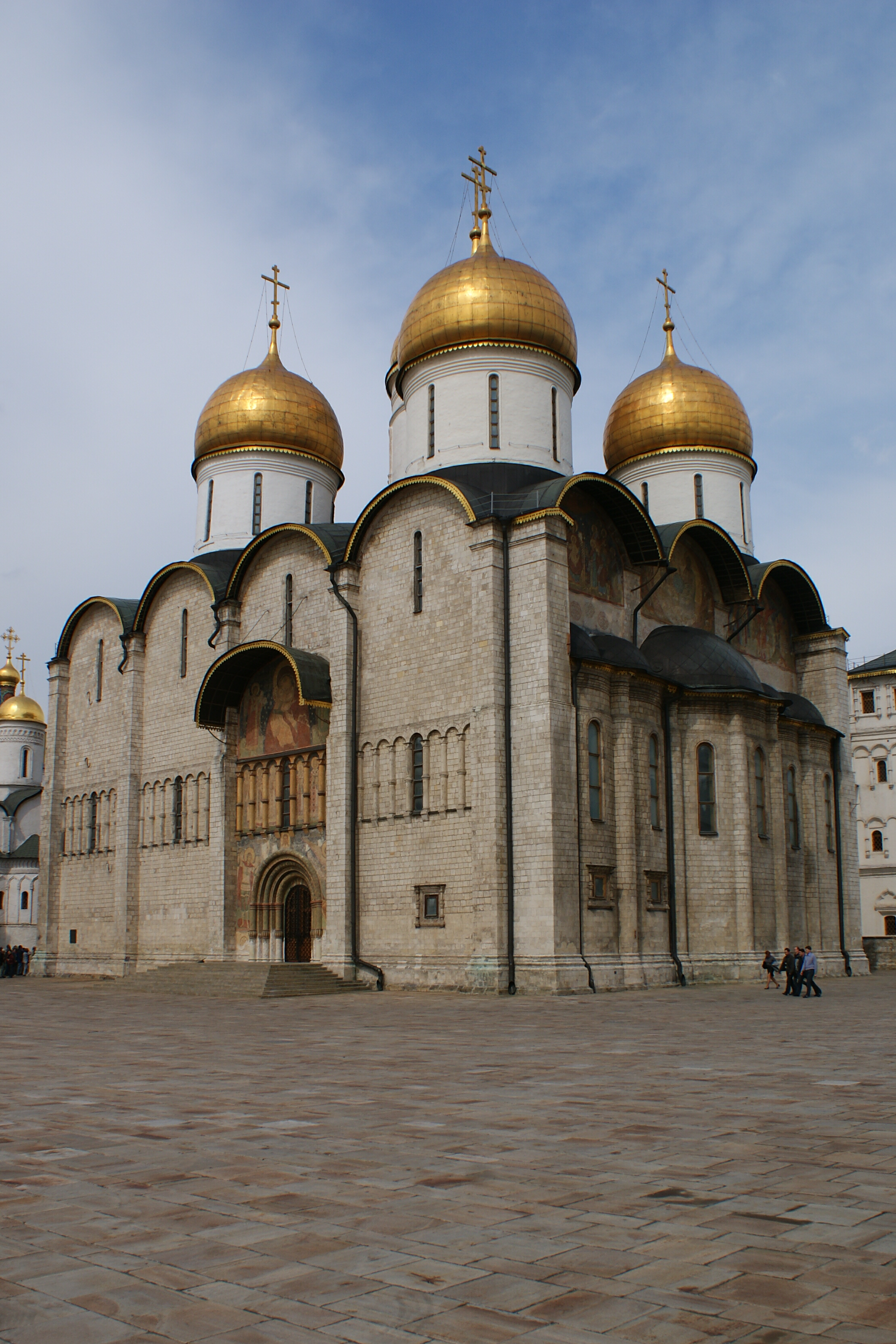
- The Cathedral of the Dormition in the Moscow Kremlin, (south façade, viewed from Cathedral Square, summer)
- Assumption Cathedral
- 55°45′04″N 37°37′01″E
- Location: Moscow
- Country: Russia
- Denomination: Russian Orthodox
- Website: assumption-cathedral.kreml.ru

History
- Consecrated: 1479

Architecture
- Style: Russian
- Years built: 1475–1479
- Groundbreaking: 1326

The Cathedral of the Dormition (Russian: Успенский собор, romanized: Uspenskiy sobor), also known as the Assumption Cathedral or Cathedral of the Assumption, is a Russian Orthodox church dedicated to the Dormition of the Theotokos. It is located on the north side of Cathedral Square of the Moscow Kremlin in Russia, where a narrow alley separates the north from the Patriarch's Palace with the Twelve Apostles Church. Separately in the southwest, also separated by a narrow passage from the church, stands the Palace of Facets. The cathedral is regarded as the mother church of Muscovite Russia.

The cathedral was originally constructed using stone in 1326 under Ivan I. The cathedral was rebuilt between 1475 and 1479 at the behest of the grand prince Ivan III to a design by the Italian architect Aristotele Fioravanti. From 1547 to 1896, the coronation of Russian monarchs took place here. In addition, the cathedral is the burial place for most of the Moscow Metropolitans and Patriarchs of the Russian Orthodox Church; it also serves as a part of the Moscow Kremlin Museums.

== History ==
=== Early history ===
Archaeological investigations in 1968 indicated that the site of the present cathedral was a medieval burial ground, supporting the hypothesis that a wooden church existed on the site in the 12th century. This was replaced by a limestone structure built around 1326, which has been mentioned in historical records.

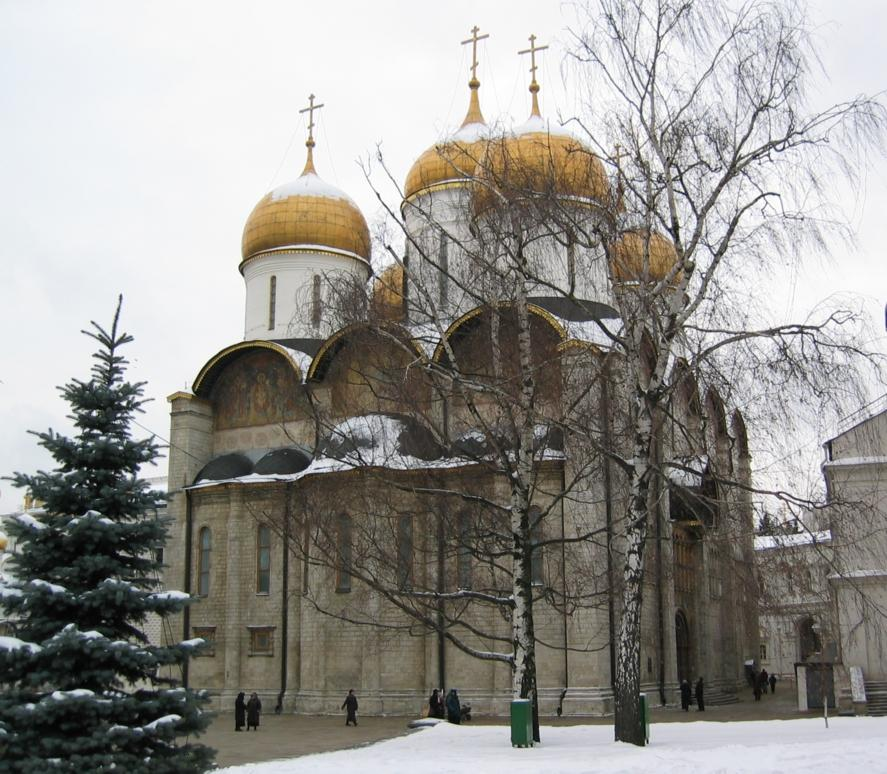
The Cathedral of the Dormition, Moscow Kremlin (east façade, winter).

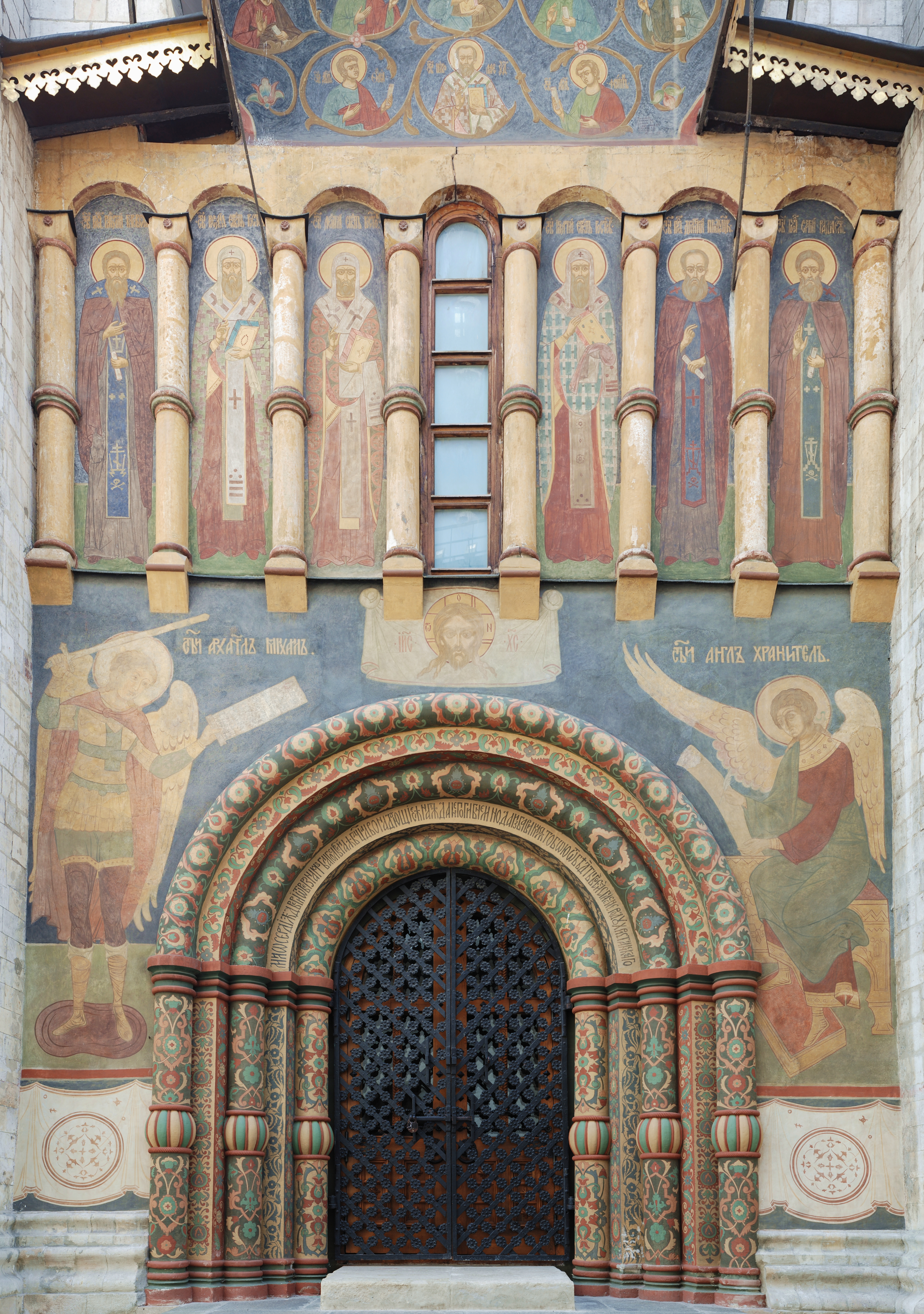
Northern door

In the 14th century, Metropolitan Peter persuaded Ivan I (Ivan Kalita) that he should build a cathedral to the Theotokos (Blessed Virgin Mary) in Moscow like the Cathedral of the Dormition in the capital city of Vladimir. Construction of the cathedral began on August 4, 1326, and the cathedral was finished and consecrated on August 4, 1327. At that time, Moscow became the capital of the Vladimir-Suzdal principality.

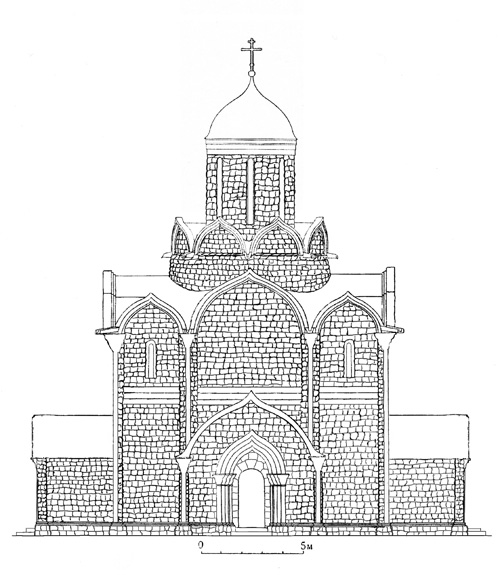
Dormition Cathedral of Ivan Kalita. Reconstruction by Sergey Zagraevsky.

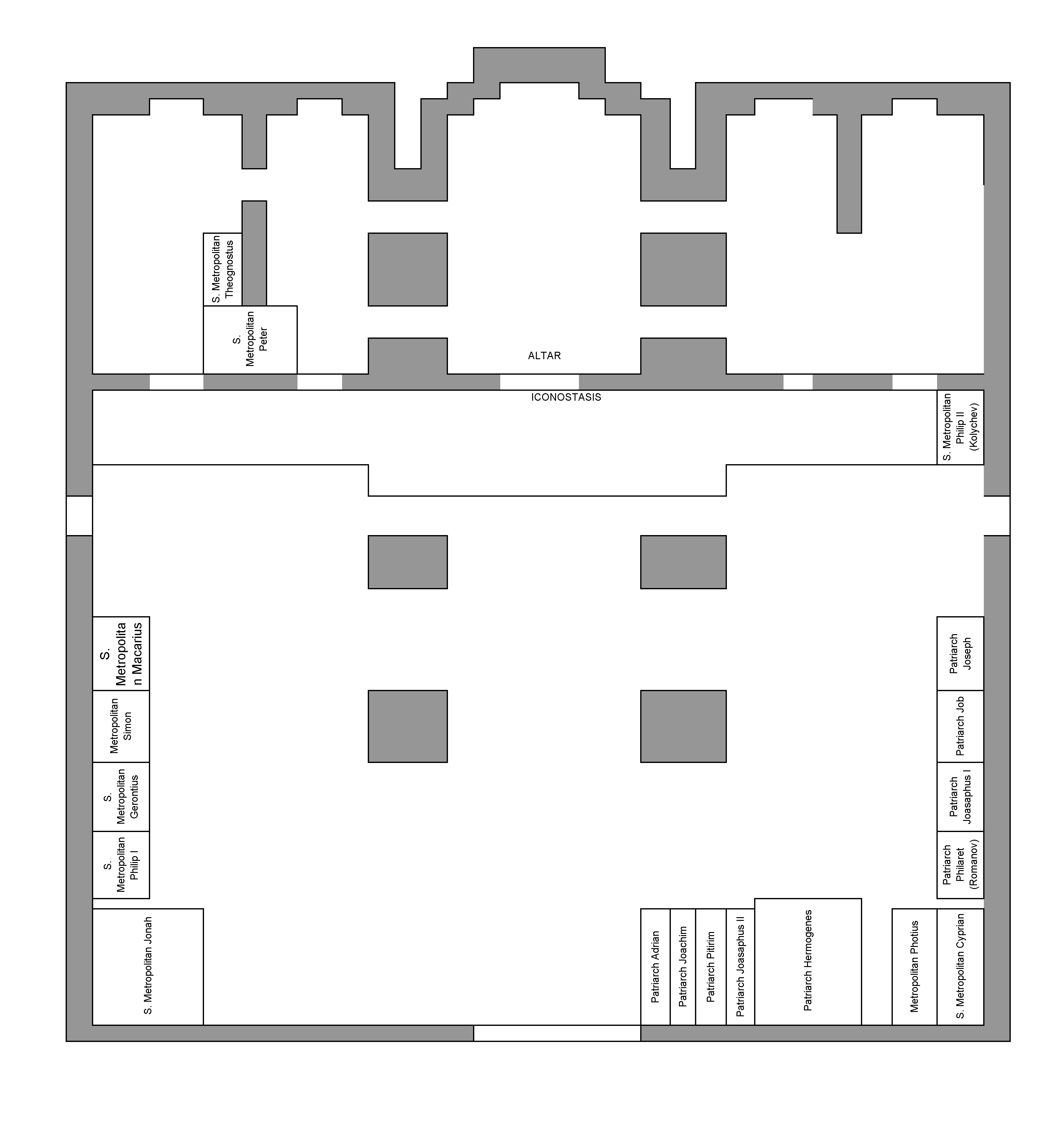
Scheme of Metropolitans' and Patriarchs' graves in the Cathedral.

By the end of the 15th century, the old cathedral had become dilapidated, and in 1472, the Moscow architects Kryvtsov and Myshkin began construction of a new cathedral. Two years later, in May 1474, the building was nearing completion when it collapsed due to an earthquake.

=== Present structure ===
Following the disaster, Ivan III then invited Aristotele Fioravanti, a celebrated architect and engineer from Bologna, Italy, to come to Moscow and entrusted him with the task of designing the cathedral from scratch in the traditions of Russian architecture. The Assumption Cathedral in Vladimir was once again taken as a model for the building, and so Fioravanti travelled to Vladimir in order to study Russian methods of building. He designed a light and spacious masterpiece that combined the spirit of the Renaissance with Russian traditions. The foundation for the new cathedral was laid in 1475, and in 1479 the new cathedral was consecrated by Metropolitan Geronty. The interior was painted with frescoes and adorned with many icons, including the Theotokos of Vladimir and Blachernitissa.

The design of the new church, with its five domes (symbolic of Jesus Christ and the Four Evangelists), proved immensely popular and was taken as a template for numerous other churches throughout Russia.

In 1547, the coronation of the first Russian Tsar, Ivan the Terrible, took place in this cathedral. From 1721, it was the scene of the coronation of the Russian emperors. The ritual installation of metropolitans and patriarchs of the Russian Orthodox Church also took place in this cathedral, and their tombs are to be found here.

The cathedral suffered from many disasters in its history, including fires in 1518, 1547, 1682, and 1737 and looting under the armies of the Polish–Lithuanian Commonwealth during the Time of Troubles in 1612. During the French occupation of Russia, it was looted and used as a horse stable.

It was thoroughly restored in 1894-1895 and from 1910 to 1918. On November 21, 1917, the cathedral was the setting for the installation of Tikhon (Bellavin), the Metropolitan of Moscow, as the first patriarch of the restored Patriarchate of Moscow. However, following the 1917 Russian Revolution, the new Bolshevik government closed all churches in the Moscow Kremlin and converted the cathedral into a museum. By special permission from Vladimir Lenin, the last Pascha (Easter service) was held in 1918. The final moment of this Paschal service was the subject of an unfinished painting by Pavel Korin entitled Farewell to Rus. Most of the church treasures were transferred to the Kremlin Armory, or were sold overseas.

The building was repaired in 1949/50, 1960 and 1978.

In 1990, the Dormition Cathedral was returned to the church for periodic religious services, shortly before the dissolution of the Soviet Union. It was restored to the Russian Orthodox Church in 1991.

== Architecture ==
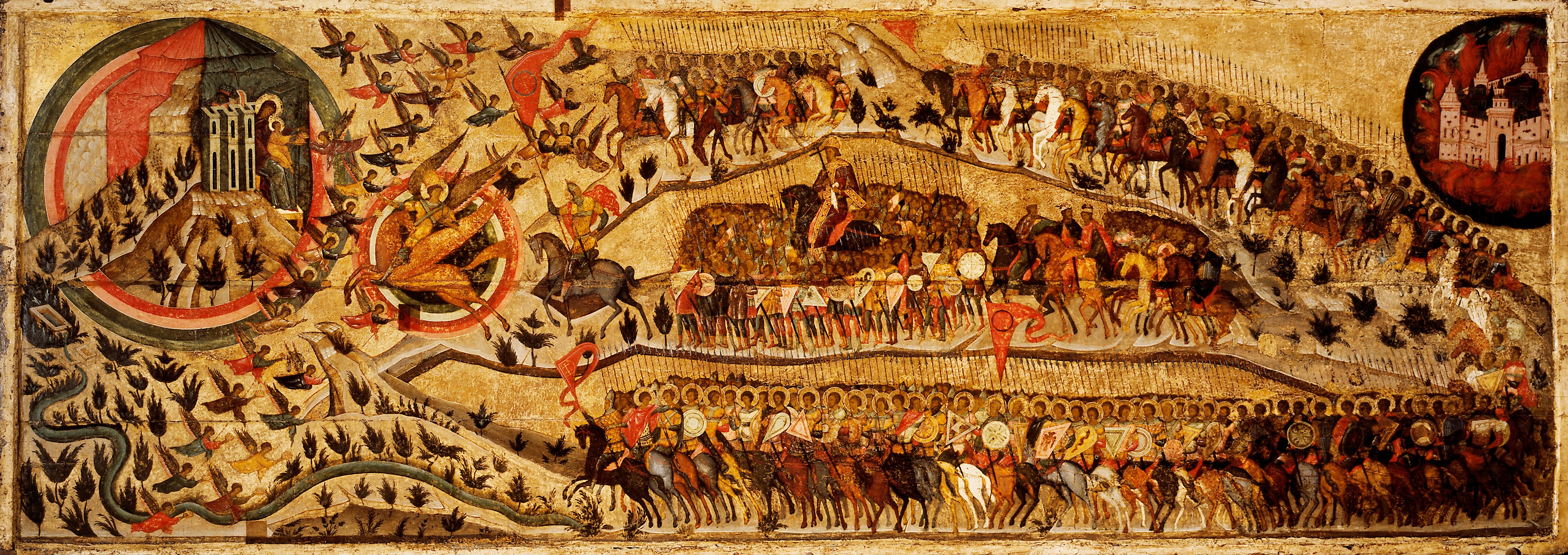
Blessed Be the Host of the King of Heaven, the cathedral's famous icon, measuring 4 meters in width

The Dormition Cathedral is an impressive structure, featuring six pillars, five apses, and five domes. Its design was inspired by the Assumption Cathedral in Vladimir, especially in its use of limestone masonry set on a raised limestone foundation. The cathedral follows a three-nave layout and includes a vaulted cross-dome, showcasing classic elements of its architectural roots. It is built of well-trimmed white-stone blocks. However, Fioravanti did not use cantilever vaults as was common in Russian architecture, but introduced groin vaults and transverse arches. For the upper portion of the building, he used specially-made bricks, larger than the standard Russian size, which reduced weight and allowed for more slender arch supports. Thus, the easternmost pair of columns in front of the apses is typically Russian in the use of massive rectangular open piers, whereas the remaining four are simpler Corinthian columns. The slim shape of these columns contributes significantly to the light, spacious effect of the interior.

Inside, the church decoration is dominated by its fresco painting. The huge iconostasis dates from 1547, but its two highest tiers are later additions from 1626 and 1653/1654 under Patriarch Nikon. In addition to its liturgical function, the iconostasis also served as a sort of trophy wall, in that Russian Tsars would add the most important icons from cities they had conquered to their collection. One of the oldest, icons with the bust of Saint George dates from the 12th century and was transferred to Moscow by Tsar Ivan IV on the conquest of the city of Veliky Novgorod in 1561.

However, one of the most important icons of the Russian Orthodox Church, the Theotokos of Vladimir kept at the cathedral from 1395 to 1919, is now at the Tretyakov Gallery.

Near the south entrance to the cathedral is the Monomach Throne of Ivan IV (1551).

== In the arts ==
The plaza in front of the cathedral is the setting for the famous Coronation Scene in Mussorgsky's opera Boris Godunov.

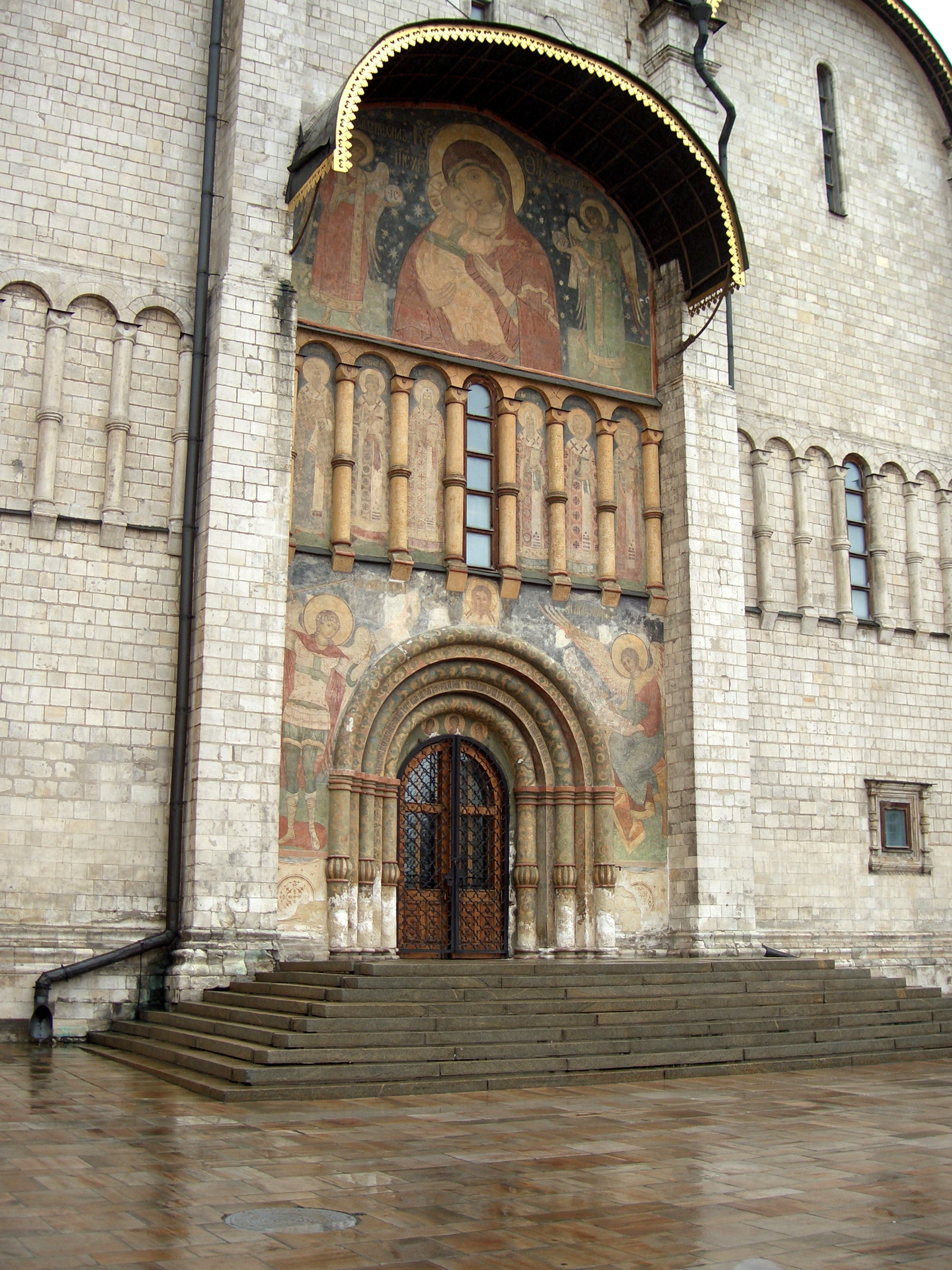
Royal Procession door of the cathedral

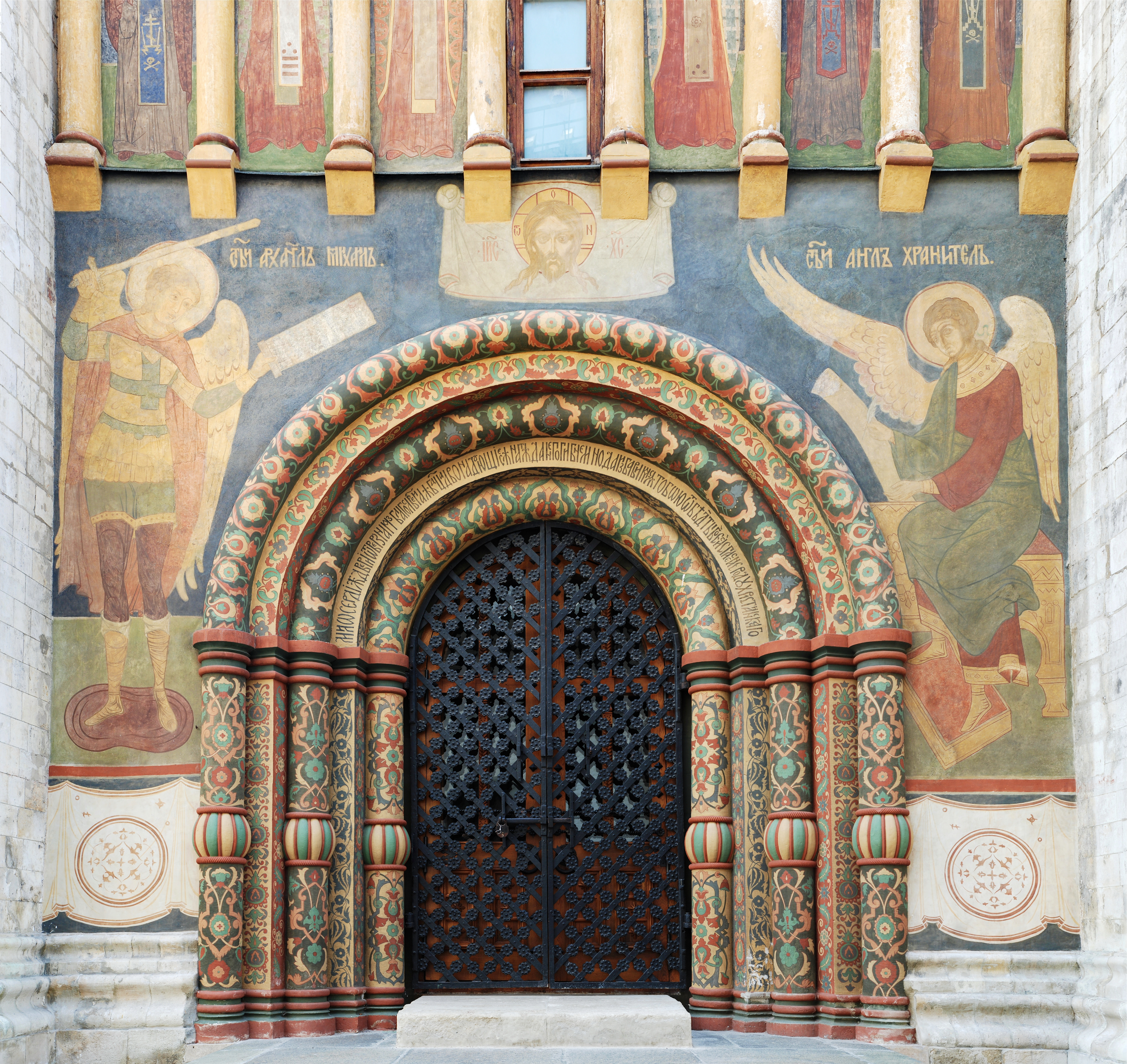
Northern portal

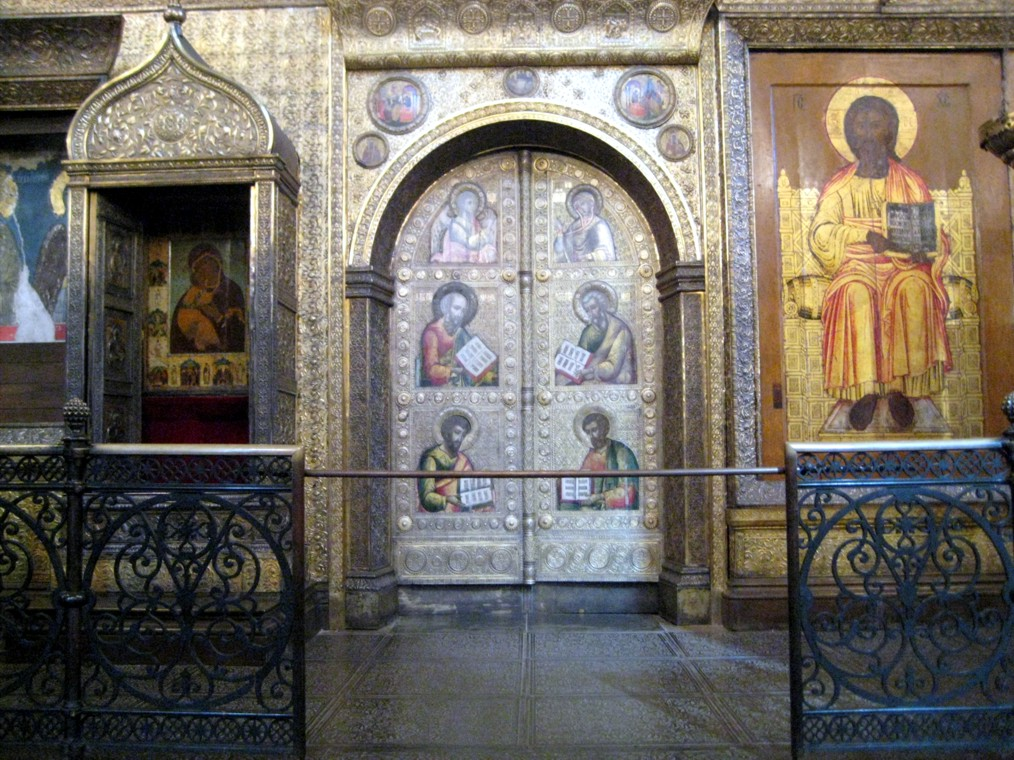
Portion of the Iconostasis and Holy Doors of Uspensky Cathedral

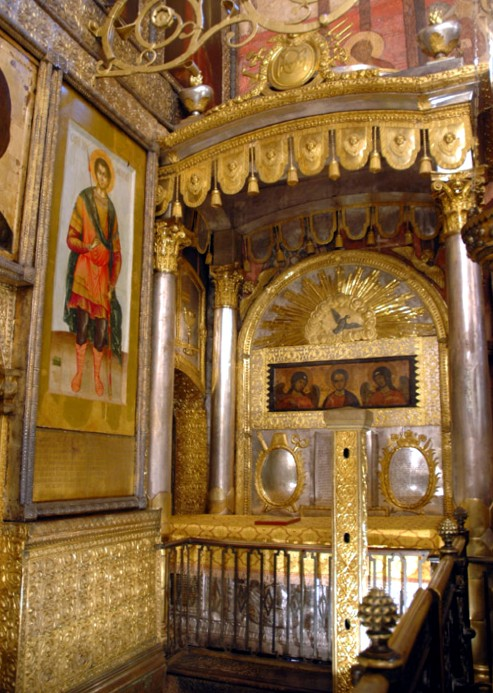
Reliquary of Philip II, Metropolitan of Moscow

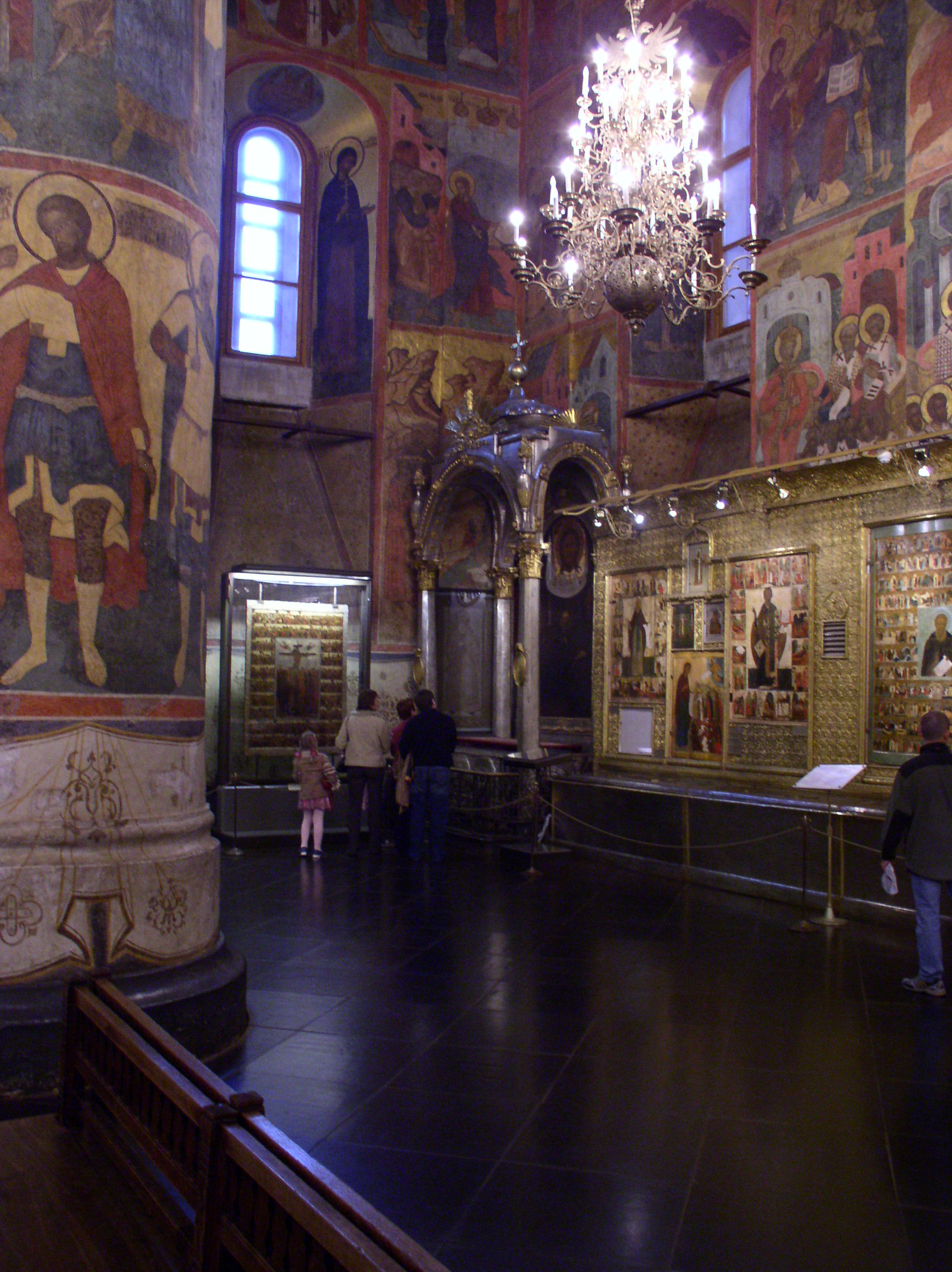
Inside the nave of the cathedral

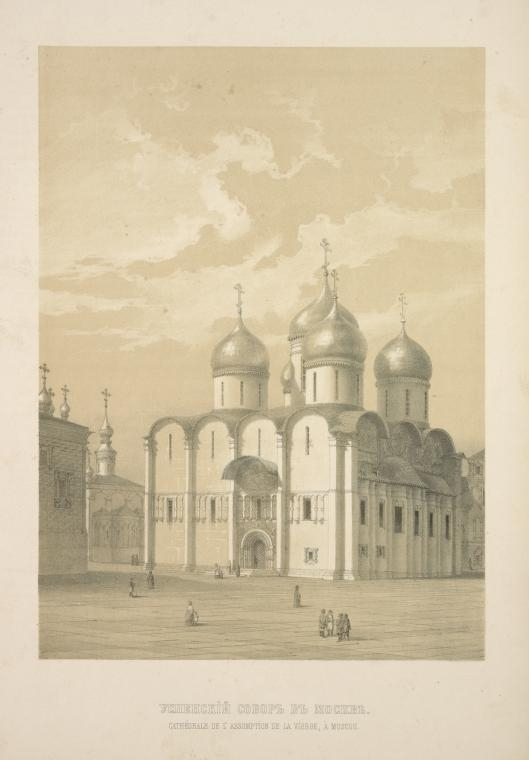
Ivan Mikhailovich Snegirev: Dormition Cathedral, Moscow (1856)

== See also ==
- Dormition of the Theotokos
