= Patriarch of Moscow and all Rus' =

Primate of the Russian Orthodox Church

Патриарх Московский и всея Руси Patriarch of Moscow and all Rus'
- Bishopric

Eastern Orthodox
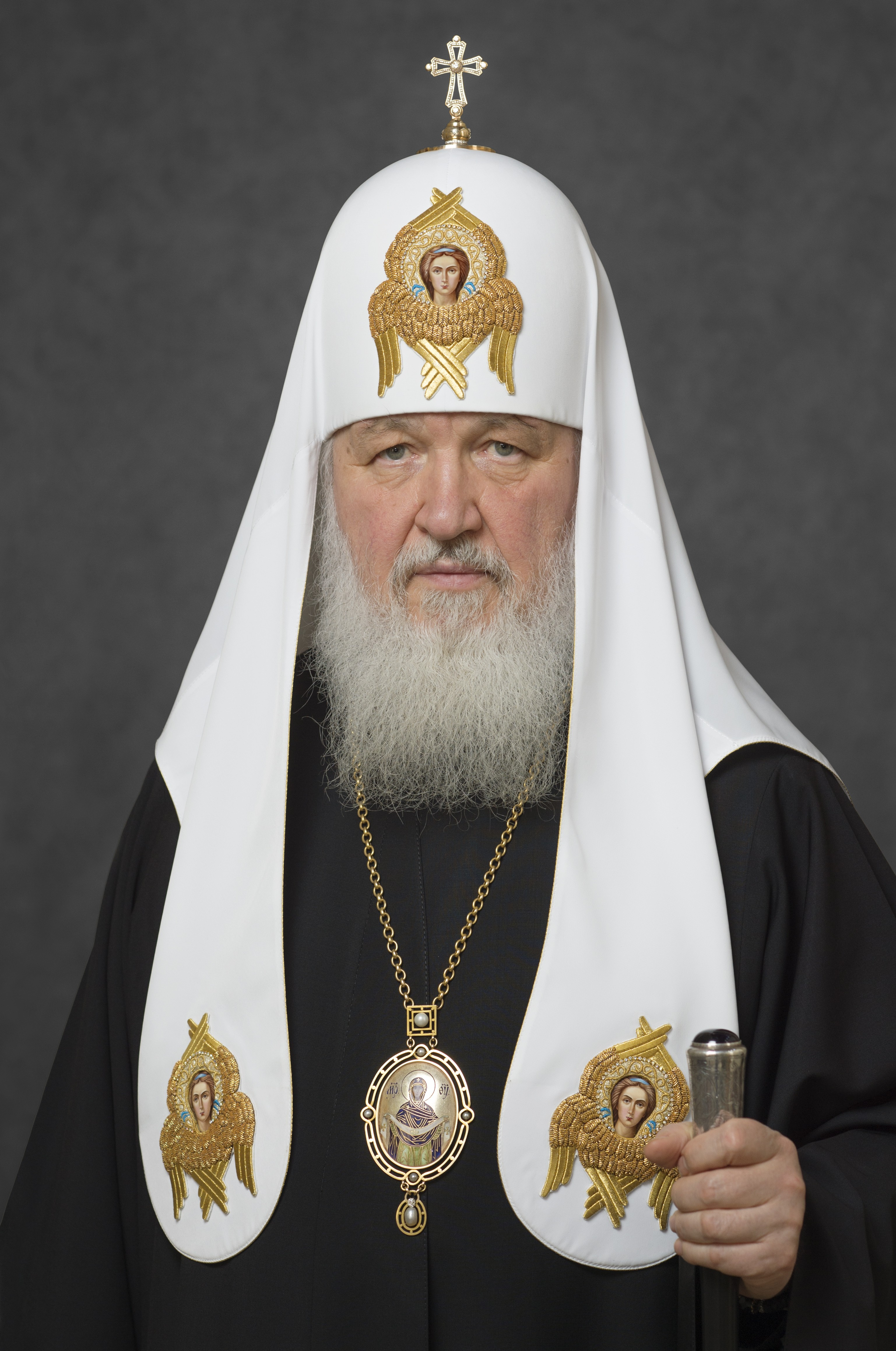

- Monogram of Patriarch Kirill
- Incumbent; Patriarch Kirill; Since 1 February 2009
- Style: His Holiness

Location
- Residence: Patriarchal Residence in Chisty Lane; Patriarchal and Synodal Residence in Danilov Monastery

Information
- First holder: Job
- Established: 1589
- Cathedral: Cathedral of Christ the Saviour and Epiphany Cathedral at Yelokhovo

Website
- patriarchia.ru

The patriarch of Moscow and all Rus' (Russian: Патриарх Московский и всея Руси, romanized: Patriarkh Moskovskiy i vseya Rusi), also known as the patriarch of Moscow and all Russia, is the title of the primate of the Russian Orthodox Church (ROC). It is often preceded by the honorific "His Holiness". As the ordinary of the diocese of Moscow, the office holder's direct canonical remit extends only to Moscow; however, as the patriarch, the office holder has a number of church-wide administrative powers as laid down by the charter of the ROC.

The patriarchate was established in 1589 when the status of the Russian metropolitan was elevated, with Job becoming the first patriarch. The patriarchate was abolished in 1721 by Peter the Great and replaced with the Most Holy Synod as the supreme governing body of the ROC, before being restored on 10 November [O.S. 28 October] 1917, by decision of the All-Russian Local Council. The current patriarch is Kirill, who acceded to the position in 2009.

== Title ==
The title refers to Rus', the historic medieval territory of the East Slavs (encompassing modern Russia, Ukraine, and Belarus), rather than the modern Russian state alone. The phrase "and all Rus'" was inherited from the medieval Metropolis of Kiev and all Rus', whose seat was transferred to Moscow in the 14th century, and it historically underpins the patriarchate's claim of canonical jurisdiction over Belarus and Ukraine.

Different variations of the title have been used over time. In 1589, Metropolitan Job was installed with the title "Patriarch of Moscow and all Russia" (or "all Rus'"). (Note: Russian: Патриарх Московский и всея Русии, Патриарх Московский и всея России.) In the 17th century, under Patriarch Nikon, it was expanded to "Patriarch of Moscow and all Great and Little and White Russia". (Note: Russian: Патриарх Московский и всея великия и малыя и белыя России.) When the patriarchate was restored in 1917, Patriarch Tikhon officially held the title "Patriarch of Moscow and all Russia" (всея России). The current phrasing, "Patriarch of Moscow and all Rus'" (всея Руси), was officially adopted in September 1943 with the election of Patriarch Sergius.

== History ==
The history of the Russian Orthodox Church (ROC) begins with the Christianization of Kievan Rus' in 988 during the reign of Vladimir the Great. Under Vladimir, the metropolis of Kiev was established and it remained under the jurisdiction of the patriarch of Constantinople until 1589. After Kiev lost its significance, the seat of the metropolitan was moved to Vladimir in 1299. In 1325, it was moved to Moscow.

The ROC declared autocephaly in 1448, shortly before the fall of Constantinople, owing to its protest over the Council of Florence. The Russian Church came to function independently as a council of Russian bishops elected their own metropolitan without reference to Constantinople.

After Constantinople fell in 1453, Moscow became the only independent Orthodox power and its leaders soon began to advance the claim that Moscow was the successor to the Byzantine Empire, calling it the "third Rome". The fall of Constantinople, viewed by the Russians as divine punishment, confirmed the nascent independence of the Russian Church. The political and territorial consolidation of Russia was reflected by the unification and standardization of Orthodoxy.

=== Regularization of canonical status ===
In 1589, Metropolitan Job was consecrated as the first Russian patriarch with the blessing of Jeremias II of Constantinople. As a result, the patriarchate was granted equal status to those of Constantinople, Antioch, Jerusalem and Alexandria. In the decree establishing the patriarchate, the whole Russian tsardom is called a "third Rome".

In 1590, a council held in Constantinople confirmed the new status of Moscow, and three years later, the four other Orthodox patriarchs ratified this at another council with the support of 42 bishops. Moscow differed in that it was the only independent Orthodox power and this led to the culmination of the idea that Moscow was the "third Rome". The Russian Church was accorded the fifth place in the diptych of the Eastern Orthodox Church.

=== Disestablishment by the state ===
Upon the death of Patriarch Adrian in 1700, Peter I of Russia (r. 1682–1725) decided against an election of a new patriarch. Peter believed that Russia's resources, including the church, could be used to establish a modern European state and he sought to strengthen the authority of the monarch. He established a commission for drafting new legislation that would limit church privileges and introduce taxation of dioceses.

Peter replaced the patriarch with a council known as the Most Holy Synod in 1721, which consisted of appointed bishops, monks, and priests. The church was also overseen by an ober-procurator that would directly report to the emperor. Peter's reforms marked the beginning of the synodal period of the Russian Church, which would last until 1917. He also soon secured the agreement of the other patriarchs to recognize the synod as the legitimate successor of the Russian patriarch in all ecclesiastical affairs of the ROC. Peter's reforms created a centralized administrative structure with effective control over all dioceses.

=== Restoration ===
The office of the patriarch was restored by decision of the All-Russian Local Council on 11 November [O.S. 28 October] 1917. The first patriarch elected after its restoration was Tikhon. However, the October Revolution and resulting civil war disturbed the unity of the ROC as Tikhon was unable to maintain communication with various dioceses. In the following years, a number of entities in newly independent states declared their independence from the ROC. The main body of the ROC, led by Tikhon, was subject to persecution by the Soviet government.

In 1990, Alexy II was elected as the patriarch of Moscow and he oversaw the revival of the ROC with the reopening of numerous dioceses and the restoration of thousands of churches and monasteries. He was succeeded by Kirill in 2009. The ROC is administered according to the Church Statute of 2000, overseeing all Orthodox parishes in Russia directly or providing jurisdictional guidance to autonomous churches.

== Selection ==
According to the Charter of the Russian Orthodox Church adopted in 2000, the tenure of a patriarch is for life, and the right to trial a deposed patriarch as well as the question of his retirement belong to the Council of Bishops.

Between terms, the Holy Synod of the Russian Orthodox Church elects the chair from among its permanent members of the locum tenens of the Patriarchal throne. "Not later than six months after the release of locum tenens of the patriarchal throne, and the Holy Synod of the local council ... shall convene to elect a new Patriarch of Moscow and all Rus'."

The candidate for the patriarch must be a bishop of the Russian Orthodox Church, not younger than 40 years old, have a "higher theological education, the expertise of the diocesan administration".

The procedure for the election of the patriarch of the charter was not detailed, "place-holder establishes the procedure for electing the Holy Synod". In 2011, the Presidium of the Inter-Council Presence reviewed the draft document "The procedure and criteria for the election of the Patriarch of Moscow and all Rus'" and decided to send it to the diocese for comment and publish the discussion. In the 20th century, Metropolitan Tikhon as patriarch was elected by lot from the three pre-approved for the Local Council candidates; between rigid state control over the affairs of the Russian Orthodox Church Sergius, Alexy I and Pimen were elected uncontested open vote on the approval of the government.

Alexius II was elected to the Local Council in 1990 by secret ballot in the first round, which was attended by three candidates approved by the Council of Bishops earlier (and local council had the right to add to the list of new candidates), and the second — the two candidates with the most votes in the first round.

Kirill I was elected on 27 January 2009 by the ROC Local Council (the 2009 Pomestny Sobor) as Patriarch of Moscow and all Rus' and Primate of the Russian Orthodox Church, with 508 votes out of 700. He was enthroned on 1 February 2009. The Patriarch enters the dignity during a special ceremony of enthronement, which is held a few days after the election.

== See also ==
- List of heads of the Russian Orthodox Church
  - List of metropolitans and patriarchs of Moscow

== Sources ==
- Fennell, John (14 January 2014). A History of the Russian Church to 1488. Routledge. ISBN 978-1-317-89720-0.
- Kent, Neil (2021). A Concise History of the Russian Orthodox Church. Academica Press. ISBN 978-1-68053-907-3.
- Krindatch, Alexey D. (25 August 2011). "Religious Communities in Russia". In Juergensmeyer, Mark (ed.). The Oxford Handbook of Global Religions. Oxford University Press. pp. 299–315. ISBN 978-0-19-976764-9.
- Gavrilkin, Konstantin (3 February 2014). McGuckin, John Anthony (ed.). The Concise Encyclopedia of Orthodox Christianity. John Wiley & Sons. pp. 401–411. ISBN 978-1-118-75933-2.
- Patte, Daniel (2010). The Cambridge Dictionary of Christianity. Cambridge University Press. ISBN 978-1-139-00681-1.
- Rock, Stella (17 August 2006). Angold, Michael (ed.). The Cambridge History of Christianity: Volume 5, Eastern Christianity. Cambridge University Press. pp. 253–275. ISBN 978-0-521-81113-2.
- Shevzov, Vera (2012). Casiday, Augustine (ed.). The Orthodox Christian World. Routledge. pp. 15–40. ISBN 978-0-415-45516-9.
