= Dionysius, Metropolitan of Moscow =

Metropolitan of Moscow from 1581 to 1587

Dionysius
- Metropolitan of Moscow and all Russia
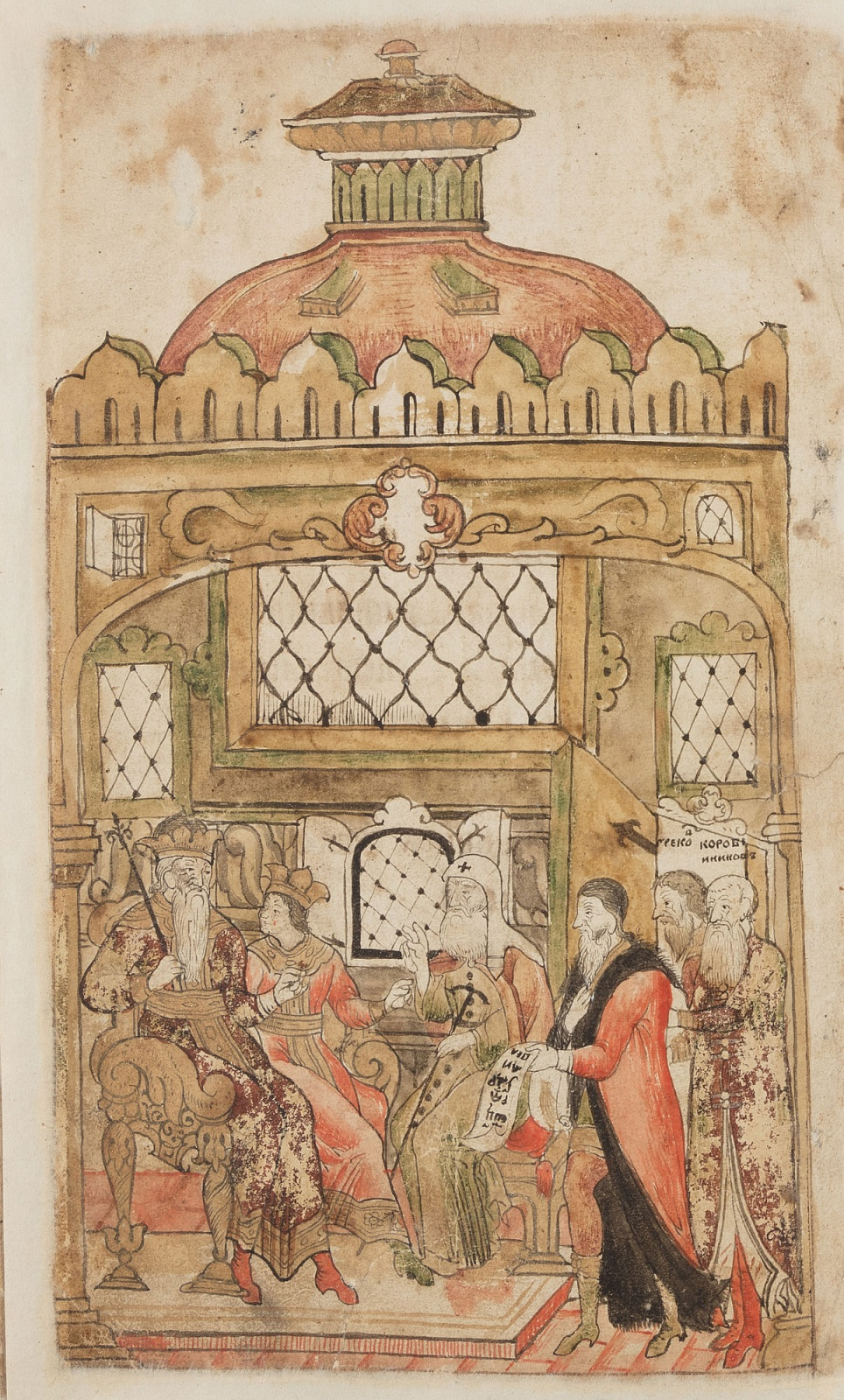
- Ivan the Terrible and Metropolitan Dionysius receive merchants
- Church: Russian Orthodox Church
- See: Moscow
- Installed: 1581
- Term ended: 1587
- Predecessor: Anthony
- Successor: Job

Personal details
- Born: 1500s
- Died: 1591

Dionysius (Russian: Дионисий; died 1591) was Metropolitan of Moscow and all Rus', the primate of the Russian Orthodox Church, from 1581 to 1587. He was the sixteenth metropolitan in Moscow to be appointed without the approval of the Ecumenical Patriarch of Constantinople as had been the norm.

== Biography ==
He first served at the Khutyn Monastery. Dionysius was selected as the metropolitan bishop by Ivan IV in 1581. He was notable for his eloquence and a number of works (all of them lost), and was known as a "wise grammarian". Being a close friend of the Shuisky family, Dionysius managed to reconcile them with the Godunovs in 1585. At the same time, he attempted to persuade Tsar Feodor I to divorce Irina Godunova. For this, he was deposed at the instigation of Boris Godunov in 1587 and was exiled to the Khutyn Monastery outside Novgorod the Great. He died there in 1591.

Eastern Orthodox Church titles
Preceded by Anthony	Metropolitan of Moscow and all Rus'; 1581–1587	Succeeded by Job
