= 1971 Local Council of the Russian Orthodox Church =

1971 meeting of the Local Council of the Russian Orthodox Church was the third in the history of the Russian Orthodox Church, and second in the second patriarchal period (since 1917), which took place from May 30 to June 2, 1971, in the Trinity Lavra of St. Sergius. The Local Council meeting was held in connection with the need to elect a new primate of the Church after the death of Patriarch Alexy I. Metropolitan Pimen of Krutitsy and Kolomna, locum tenens of the patriarchal throne was elected new patriarch. Another important act of the council was the abolition of the anathema on the old rites that was issued by the Great Moscow Council of 1667, thus recognizing full communion to the Old Believers.

== Background ==
On 17 April 1970, Patriarch Alexy I died. On 12 June, the Council for Religious Affairs received permission from the CPSU Central Committee to open the council. However, the authorities did not allow the council to be held in the year of the centenary of the birth of Vladimir Lenin. The decision to convene the council was adopted on 25 June 1970, by the Holy Synod of the Russian Orthodox Church. The commission on the preparation of the Council consisted of 16 people, including two lay persons.

== Composition ==
The Local Council of 1971 was the most representative of the councils that met in the post-revolution period. It was attended by the heads of six, and representatives of five other autocephalous churches of the Eastern Orthodox world, and the heads of all three autonomous Eastern Orthodox churches, as well as the leaders of several ecumenical organizations: World Council of Churches, Christian Peace Conference, Conference of European Churches and other representatives of the non-Orthodox churches.

Council has 234 members, including 72 bishops of the Russian Orthodox Church, 84 representatives of the clergy and 78 lay faithful. In addition, 25 foreign nationals were present in the meeting, representing 124 foreign parishes of the Moscow Patriarchate.

== Meeting ==
Participants heard and discussed the report of the Patriarchal locum tenens Metropolitan Pimen, "The life and work of the Russian Orthodox Church". The reports and speeches of participants positively evaluated relation between the Russian Orthodox Church and the socialist political system, domestic and foreign policy of the Soviet government. Satisfaction was expressed towards the existing legislation on religious life, the relations between Church and State, expressed commitment to the episcopate and clergy to continue to develop "good relations with our country". The Council unanimously approved the anti-canonical changes in the Regulations on the Administration of the ROC imposed by the Council for the Affairs of the ROC on the Bishops' Council of 1961. Local Council granted autocephaly to the Orthodox Church in America and autonomy to the Japanese Orthodox Church, and also ordered church leaders to take "the necessary canonical sanctions" to the leadership of the Russian Orthodox Church Abroad.
