= 2009 Local Council of the Russian Orthodox Church =

- 27–28 January 2009
- Registered: 702 delegates
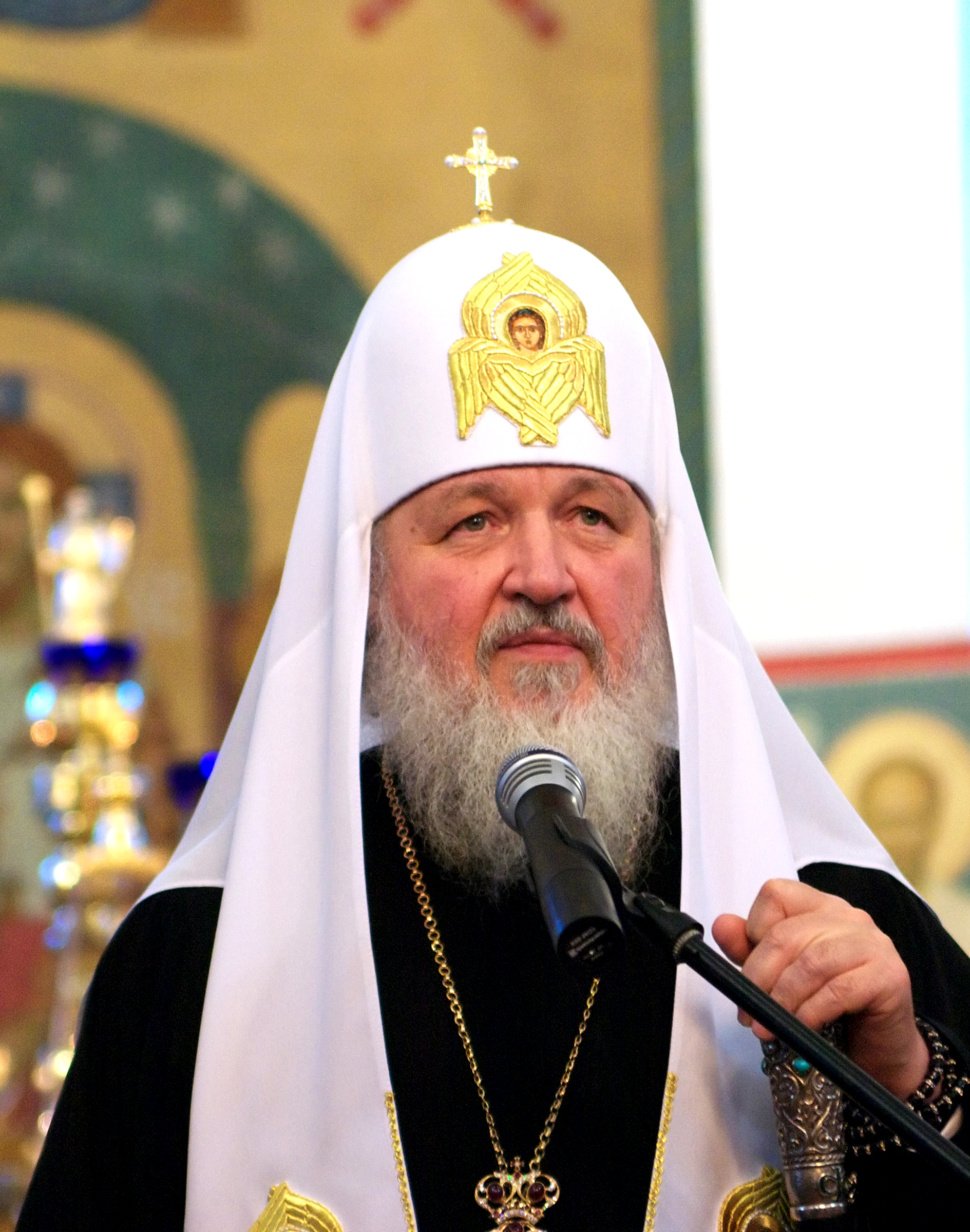

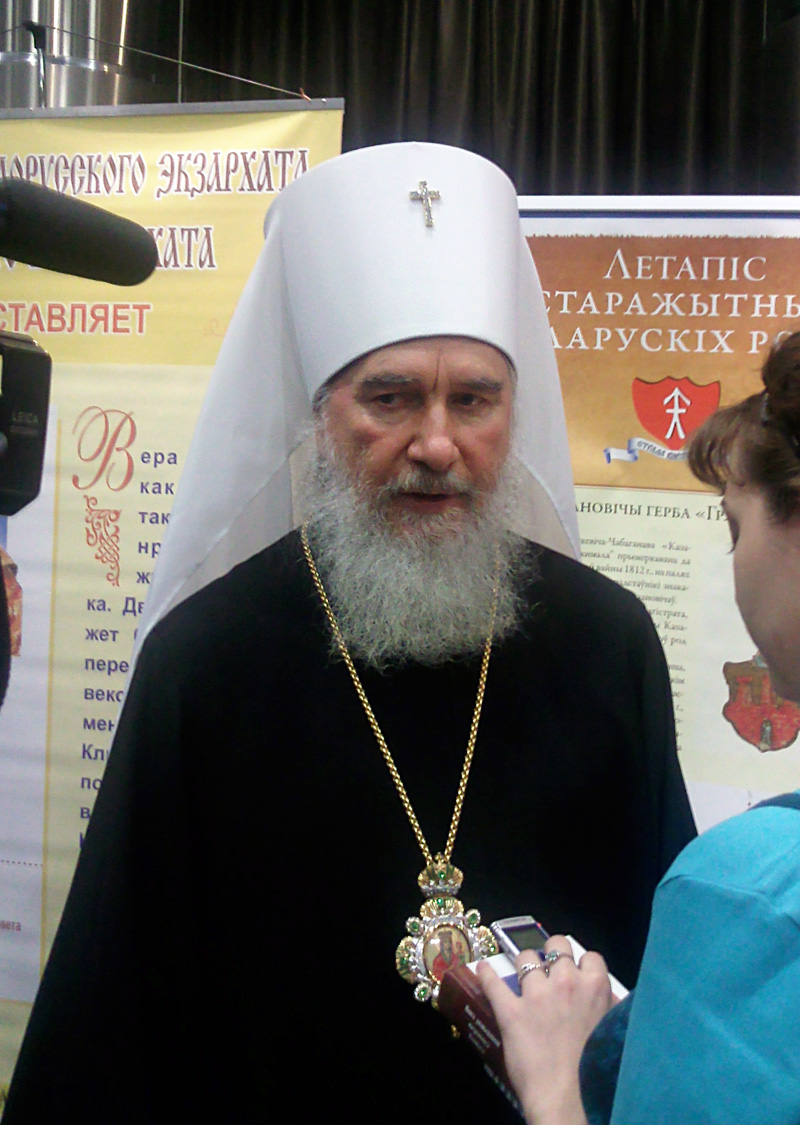
| Nominee | Kirill (Gundyayev) | Kliment (Kapalin) |
| Electoral vote | 508 | 169 |
| Percentage | 75.04% | 24.96% |
| Metropoly | Smolensk and Kaliningrad | Kaluga and Borovsk |
Patriarch of Moscow and all Rus' before election
Alexy II
Kirill (locum tenens)
Elected Patriarch of Moscow and all Rus'
Kirill

The Local Council of the Russian Orthodox Church of 2009 (Russian: Поместный собор Русской православной церкви (2009)) was the sixth Local Council in the second patriarchal period (since 1918) of the history of the Russian Orthodox Church, held from January 27 to 28, 2009, in the Moscow Cathedral of Christ the Savior. It was the first Local Council of the Russian Orthodox Church after the Local Council of 1990. Metropolitan Kirill (Gundyaev) of Smolensk and Kaliningrad was elected as the 16th Patriarch of Moscow and all Rus'.

== Background ==
Following the death of Patriarch Alexy II of Moscow and All Rus' on December 5, 2008, in accordance with the charter of the Russian Orthodox Church, the Holy Synod at its meeting on December 10, 2008 decided to hold a Local Council of the Russian Orthodox Church on January 27-29, 2009, to, in particular, elect the next Patriarch of Moscow. A Bishops' Council was scheduled for January 25-26, 2009, at which candidates for the patriarchal throne were to be determined. At the meeting of the Synod on December 10, a regulation was adopted on the composition of the Local Council (Part 2, Clause 4, Chapter II of the Charter of the Russian Orthodox Church); A commission for the preparation of the Local Council of the Russian Orthodox Church was formed, consisting of 29 people, headed by the patriarchal locum tenens, Metropolitan Kirill (Gundyaev) of Smolensk and Kaliningrad. The enthronement of the newly elected patriarch was scheduled for February 1, 2009.

On December 24, 2008, the Holy Synod of the Russian Orthodox Church reviewed the results of the work of the first plenary session of the commission for the preparation of the Local Council of the Russian Orthodox Church; the Synod approved the draft documents prepared by the commission: the agenda, program, and regulations of the Bishops' and Local Councils of the Russian Orthodox Church; the procedure for electing candidates for the patriarchal throne from the Bishops' Council; the procedure for electing His Holiness the Patriarch of Moscow and All Rus' by the Local Council; and drafts of a number of working documents of the councils. The above documents were subject to final approval at the Bishops' and Local Councils. It was proposed that the Bishops' Council determine three candidates for the patriarchal throne by secret ballot (from among bishops over 40 years of age, with higher theological education and experience in managing a diocese); in addition, candidates for the patriarchal throne could also be nominated at the Local Council, with candidates determined by secret ballot; it was proposed that the election of the patriarch at the Local Council also be conducted by secret ballot.

On January 17, 2009, a pre-council meeting of the delegates of the Ukrainian Orthodox Church to the Local Council of the Russian Orthodox Church was held in the Kiev-Pechersk Lavra. After the Divine Liturgy, Metropolitan Vladimir of Kiev and All Ukraine addressed his flock with a message dedicated to the election of the new Patriarch of Moscow and All Rus'. After a short meal, a bishops' conference was held in the hall of bishops' meetings of the Kiev-Pechersk Lavra, at which the administrator of the Ukrainian Orthodox Church, Archbishop Mitrofan Yurchuk of Belotserkovsky and Boguslavsky, acquainted all the delegates of the Local Council from the Ukrainian Orthodox Church with the program and regulations of the work of the Bishops' Council of the Russian Orthodox Church on January 25-26, 2009 and the Local Council of the ROC on January 27-29, 2009, as well as with the upcoming enthronement of the newly elected patriarch. The Primate of the Ukrainian Orthodox Church, Vladimir, Metropolitan of Kiev and All Ukraine, also addressed the delegates of the Council with an exhortation to preserve unity, peace, and brotherly love during the work of the Bishops' Council and Local Council of the ROC.

== Participants ==
On January 15, 2009, the nomination of delegates to the local council from dioceses and other structures was completed. According to the chairman of the department of external church relations of the Ukrainian Orthodox Church, Archimandrite Kirill (Govorun) (interview published on January 21, 2009), "out of over 700 delegates to the local council, about 200 will be from Ukraine".

Among the members of the council were 72 women (both nuns and laywomen); most participants in the council were citizens of countries other than Russia. The total number of delegates was 711, of which 44.8% were citizens of Russia, 28.6% were citizens of Ukraine, and 7.1% were citizens of Belarus; Bishops - 30.4%, clergy - 40%, laity - 23.4%; men - 89.7%, women - 10.3%.

== Security and secrecy measures ==
The Council was held in an atmosphere of heightened security and secrecy: in particular, during its sessions (as well as the Bishops' Council on January 25, 2009), unnamed "special services" blocked the operation of mobile phones and any possible means of communication and sound recording in the church building; the church building was surrounded by employees of the Ministry of Internal Affairs.

== Agenda of the Council ==
The convocation of the Council was caused by the need to elect a new primate of the Russian Orthodox Church, according to the Charter of the Russian Orthodox Church (2000). The work of the Council was scheduled for three days, from January 27 to 29, and nine plenary sessions were to be held. On January 28, the Council was closed. According to the head of the press service of the Moscow Patriarchate, priest Vladimir Vigilyansky, this happened because the main goal of the Council, the election of a new patriarch, was fulfilled on January 27.

== Media coverage ==
A week before the Council, Stanislav Minin wrote in Nezavisimaya Gazeta: “The excitement around the upcoming elections is unprecedented ... Beginning in December, the hierarchs of the Russian Orthodox Church called on the public not to view the election of the Patriarch through the prism of general ideas about political elections. Of course, this was an attempt to cast a spell on reality. The reality is that there are no real competitive political elections in today's Russia, and church elections have become a kind of outlet for us".

In the Russian media, the main candidates were initially named as Metropolitan Kirill of Smolensk and Kaliningrad, Metropolitan Kliment of Kaluga and Borovsk (Kapalin), Metropolitan Juvenal Poyarkov of Krutitsy and Kolomn, and Metropolitan Filaret of Minsk and Slutsk (Vakhromeev).

The composition of the Council caused active discussion in the Russian media: a significant proportion of the lay members of the Council were representatives of government and business.

The missionary, Deacon Andrey Kuraev, who spoke out in statements and articles as an unequivocal supporter of Metropolitan Kirill, took an active part in the discussion of the upcoming Council and the candidates for patriarch.

On January 15, 2009, the Administrator of the Moscow Patriarchate, Metropolitan Kliment Kapalin of Kaluga and Borovsk, called on secular media to exercise restraint in covering the pre-council process: “Unfortunately, external sources are projecting a secular election campaign onto a church one. We have no factions, parties, or divisions into groups”.

On January 22, 2009, the Kommersant newspaper claimed that "...on the eve of the elections, supporters of Metropolitan Clement, who is considered the leader of the "conservatives", and Kirill, who is considered the leader of the "modernist" wing, have begun actively distributing incriminating evidence".

The Vedomosti newspaper claimed that the delegates to the Council it interviewed, who are members of the United Russia party, do not hide the fact that they will vote for Metropolitan Kirill, believing that "it is he who is supported by the leadership of the party and the country".

The government-owned Rossiyskaya Gazeta published an interview with the patriarchal locum tenens, Metropolitan Kirill, in which he, rejected accusations against the leadership of the patriarchate that it is betraying Orthodoxy by participating in ecumenical organizations, in particular, in the World Council of Churches; In response to the question of "why, in addition to respected priests and theologians, an actress, a circus director, and entrepreneurs will be chosen as the Patriarch," Metropolitan Kirill said: "The fact that active laypeople representing various strata of society will participate in the Council does not contradict church tradition. Delegates to the Local Council were chosen in the dioceses. I believe that this choice should be respected. By the way, why should the aforementioned professions be considered shameful from the outset?..." On the same day, the portal interfax-religion.ru, which closely cooperates with the Department for External Church Relations of the Moscow Patriarchate (the synodal institution headed by Metropolitan Kirill), posted on its website an interview with the representative of the Russian Orthodox Church to international organizations in Europe, member of the pre-Council commission, Bishop Hilarion (Alfeyev) of Vienna, in which he actively defended Metropolitan Kirill from accusations of commercial activity and dogmatic errors.

== Bishops' Council ==
The opening of the Bishops' Council of the Russian Orthodox Church on January 25, 2009 was preceded by a liturgy in the upper (main) Cathedral of Christ the Savior, led by the Patriarchal Locum Tenens Metropolitan Kirill; members of the Holy Synod of the Russian Orthodox Church, other archpastors who had arrived for the Council, and Moscow clergy prayed at the liturgy.

After the meal, the Bishops' Council opened in the Hall of Church Councils (basement floor of the Cathedral of Christ the Savior), with 198 of the 202 bishops of the Russian Orthodox Church taking part.

The Bishops' Council nominated the following bishops as candidates for the Patriarchal throne:

- Metropolitan Kirill (Gundyaev) of Smolensk and Kaliningrad (97 votes);
- Metropolitan of Kaluga and Borovsk Kliment Kapalin (32 votes);
- Metropolitan of Minsk and Slutsk Philaret Vakhromeyev (16 votes).

In addition, Metropolitan of Krutitsy and Kolomna Juvenaly received 13 votes, Metropolitans of Kiev Volodymyr Sabodan and Chernivtsi Onufriy (Berezovsky) received 10 votes each; Metropolitan of Voronezh Sergiy (Fomin) - 7 votes, of Chisinau Vladimir (Kantaryan) - 4 votes, of Odessa Agathangel (Savvin) - 3 votes; five bishops of the Russian Orthodox Church received one vote each, who apparently voted for themselves.

The Definitions "On the Preparation of the Local Council of the Russian Orthodox Church" and "On Candidates for the Patriarchal Throne" were also adopted; the Charter on the convocation of the Local Council of the Russian Orthodox Church was approved; the Regulation on the composition of the Local Council was approved; a number of documents concerning the organization of the work of the Council were reviewed and preliminarily approved for subsequent approval by the Local Council.

In connection with the fact that the agenda of the Bishops' Council was exhausted during the meeting on January 25, the Locum Tenens of the Patriarchal Throne, Presiding over the Council, announced the end of its work. At the end of the meeting, the Most Reverend Bishops, participants of the Council, sang the prayer "It is truly worthy".

The approaches to the Cathedral of Christ the Savior were blocked by law enforcement officers. About 200 people gathered at the monument to Friedrich Engels, calling themselves members of the public movement in support of the local council. The movement included: the Orthodox corps of the "Nashi" movement, the Union of Orthodox Banner Bearers, the Union of Orthodox Brotherhoods, and the Union of Orthodox Citizens.

== The course of the Local Council ==
After the liturgy celebrated by the permanent members of the Synod in the lower Transfiguration Church, the Local Council opened in the upper Cathedral of Christ the Savior. Before the beginning of the session, the Locum Tenens of the Patriarchal Throne, Metropolitan Kirill, performed a prayer service before a copy of the Feodorovskaya Icon of the Mother of God.

At the first plenary session, a presidium of the Local Council of 13 people was elected. At the suggestion of the Bishops' Council, the following were formed:

The Secretariat of the Council — Secretary, Administrator of the Affairs of the Moscow Patriarchate, Metropolitan Kliment Kapalin of Kaluga and Borovsk; the Credentials Committee — Chairman, Archbishop Mark Petrovtsy of Khust and Vinogradov; the Editorial Committee — Chairman, Archbishop Alexander Mogilyov of Kostroma and Galich; Counting commission — Chairman Metropolitan Isidore Kirichenko of Yekaterinodar and Kuban. Metropolitan Kirill read a report on the state of the Russian Orthodox Church during the years of the Patriarchate of Alexy II.

At the second plenary session, Metropolitan Vladimir of Kiev and All Ukraine spoke, telling about the current state of the Ukrainian Church - Moscow Patriarchate. He also announced that he would cast his vote for Metropolitan Kirill in the elections. During the session of the Council, no additional candidates for patriarch were nominated: the proposal for the Council to renounce this right came from Metropolitan Hilarion Shukalo of Donetsk and Mariupol. Metropolitan Filaret of Minsk and Slutsk recused himself and asked those who voted for him to vote for Metropolitan Kirill. In his statement, the Metropolitan emphasized: “We must consolidate before electing the Patriarch”. At this meeting, the participants of the Council approved the program, regulations, and agenda, as well as the procedure for electing the Patriarch. The Chairman of the Credentials Committee, Archbishop Mark, reported the presence of a quorum.

According to information from the Nezavisimaya Gazeta of January 28, 2009, the Council did not add to the list of candidates and decided to choose from the two remaining candidates; the proposal of Archbishop Feodosiy Bilchenko of Polotsk to elect the Patriarch by lot was rejected.

At 17:30 Moscow time, according to the program of the Local Council, the third plenary session began, and the participants of the Council began to elect the Patriarch of Moscow and All Rus'.

Around 19:00, the end of voting was announced, and the counting commission began to count the votes. The press service of the Local Council reported that the announcement of the results will take place after 20:00 in the Cathedral of Christ the Savior.

At 22:00, the official results of the vote have been announced. Metropolitan Kirill, having received 508 votes out of 677, was elected the sixteenth Patriarch of Moscow and All Rus'. Metropolitan Kliment (Kapalin) of Kaluga and Borovsk received 169 votes. Of the 702 delegates, two did not place their ballots in the ballot box, 700 ballots participated in the vote, 23 of which were invalid.
