= Diocese of Barysaŭ =

Eparchy of the Belarusian Orthodox Church

Diocese of Barysaŭ Барысаўская епархія
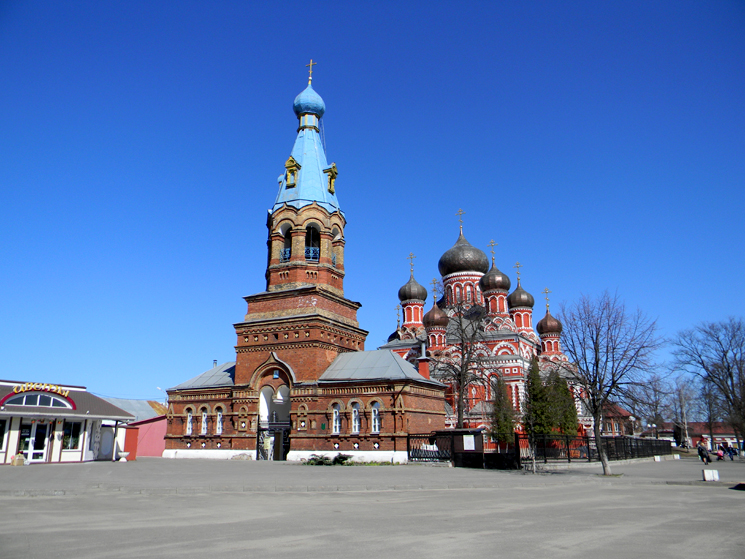
- the Holy Resurrection Cathedral

Location
- Country: Belarus
- Territory: Minsk Region (partial)

Information
- Established: 23 April 2014
- Cathedral: Cathedral of the Holy Resurrection

Current leadership
- Metropolitan: Vienijamin (Tupieka)

Map
- Diocese of Barysaŭ

Website
- borisoveparhia.by

The Diocese of Barysaŭ (Belarusian: Барысаўская епархія, romanized: Barysaŭskaja jeparchija; Russian: Бори́совская епа́рхия, romanized: Borisovskaya yeparkhiya) is an eparchy of the Belarusian Orthodox Church (an exarchate of the Russian Orthodox Church) located in Minsk Region in Belarus.

== History ==
The Diocese of Barysaŭ was first established as a vicariate of the Diocese of Minsk by the Holy Synod of the Russian Orthodox Church on 13 March 2002. On 31 March 2002, John (Khama) was ordained as bishop of Barysaŭ at Holy Spirit Cathedral in Minsk. However, on 4 June 2002, Khama was appointed as bishop of Brest, and the vicariate was left without a head.

At another meeting of the Holy Synod on 5 March 2010, the vicariate was again given a bishop at the request of Philaret. Vienijamin (Tupieka), then head of the Holy Annunciation Church and Basilian Monastery in Malyja Liady, was appointed as bishop of the diocese.

On 23 April 2014, the Holy Synod chose to promote the vicariate of Barysaŭ to a diocese. The diocese, along with the Dioceses of Minsk, Maladziečna, and Slutsk, became part of the Metropolis of Minsk.

In January 2023, the Diocese of Barysaŭ awarded two letters to the head of a local penal colony and the commander of the 740th Anti-Aircraft Regiment.
