= Patriarchal Residence in Chisty Lane =

Patriarchal residence in Chisty Lane
- Патриаршая резиденция в Чистом переулке
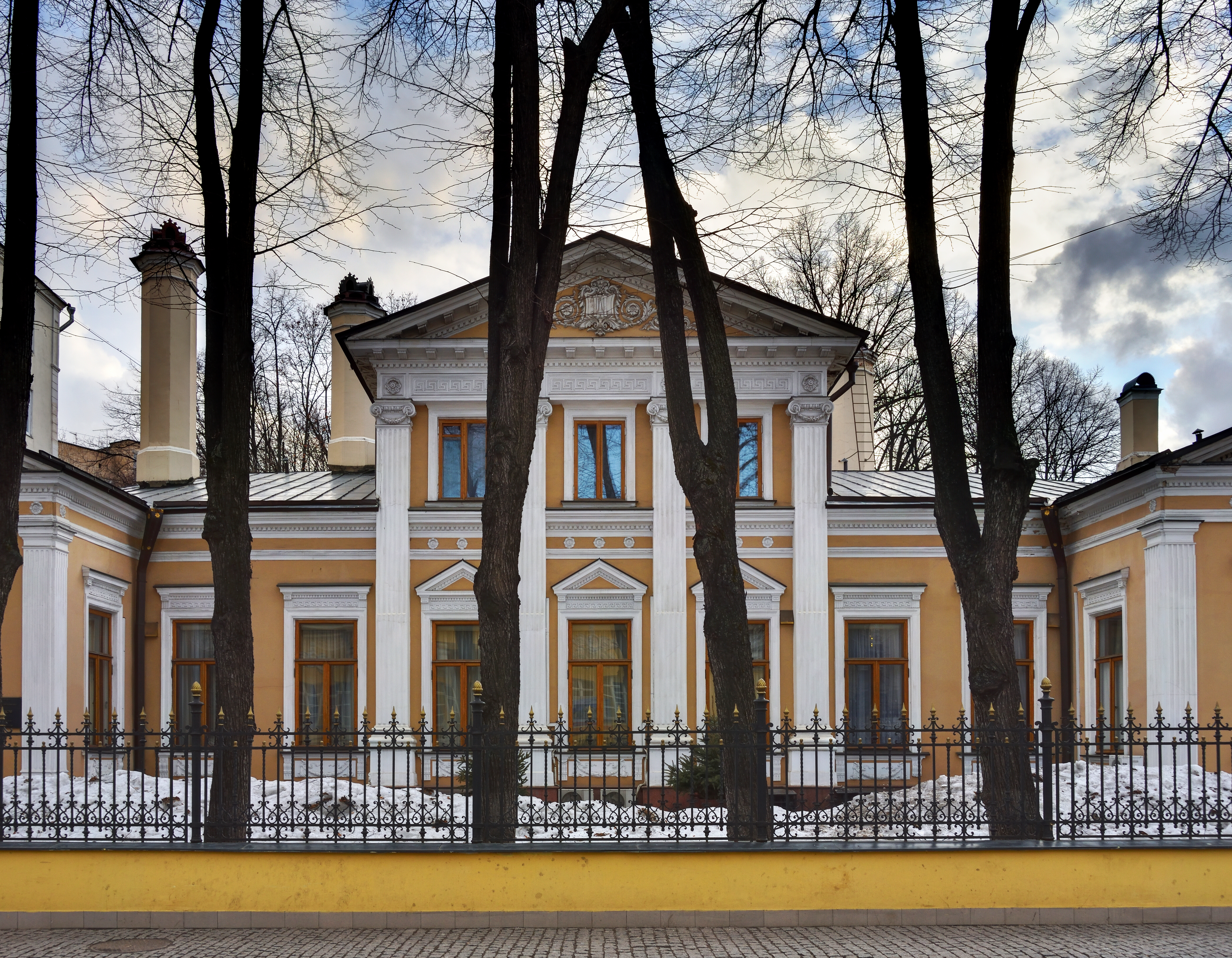
- Interactive map of the Patriarchal residence in Chisty Lane area

General information
- Type: Residence
- Architectural style: Eclectic; Neo-Manueline
- Location: 5 Chisty Lane, Moscow, Russia
- Coordinates: 55°42′39″N 37°37′40″E
- Current tenants: Patriarch of Moscow and all Rus'
- Completed: 1833 (current building)
- Owner: Russian Orthodox Church

Design and construction
- Architect: Fyodor Sokolov

The Patriarchal residence in Chisty Lane (Russian: Патриаршая резиденция в Чистом переулке) is the former city estate of the Ofrosimov family, located at Chisty Lane 5, in the Khamovniki District of the Central Administrative Okrug of Moscow. It is an architectural monument of federal significance. Since 1943, institutions of the Moscow Patriarchate have been located here, including the working residence of the Patriarch of Moscow and all Rus', the office and administration of the affairs of the Moscow Patriarchate. In 1922–1941, the heads of the German diplomatic mission to the USSR lived here.

== History ==
The household on the site of modern house No. 5 in Chisty Lane was founded in the 18th century by captain Artemy Alekseevich Obukhov, after whose last name the lane was named Obukhovsky or Obukhov.

Since 1796, the estate belonged to the Ofrosimov family. Since 1805, the owner of the property, which included the territory of house No. 7, was Major General Pavel Ofrosimov. After his death, the estate belonged to his wife Nastasya Ofrosimova, the prototype of Maremyana Babrovna Nabatova (“News, or the Living Murdered” by Fyodor Rostopchin), Anfisa Nilovna Khlestova (“Woe from Wit” by Alexander Griboyedov) and Marya Dmitrievna Akhrosimova (“War and Peace” Leo Tolstoy).

The estate, like the entire Obukhov Lane, burned out in the 1812 Great Fire of Moscow and was rebuilt according to the design of the architect Fyodor Sokolov. All manor buildings were built of wood. The main house was built in 1833, and in 1847 it was expanded and received brick extensions on the sides. At that time it was the largest building in Obukhov Lane.

In 1878, the façade was redesigned and acquired its current appearance, and redevelopment was carried out inside the building. In 1897, a new fence with an entrance gate was built.

=== Diplomatic residence ===
In 1918, the estate was requisitioned and various institutions were located there.

In 1922, Obukhov Lane was renamed Chisty, and house No. 5 was transferred to the jurisdiction of the People's Commissariat of Foreign Affairs. At the same time, the German ambassador Count Ulrich von Brockdorff-Rantzau, former foreign minister and head of the German delegation at the Paris Peace Conference of 1919–1920, settled in the house. His activities contributed to the establishment of diplomatic relations between Germany and the USSR.

On September 11, 1928, Count Brockdorff-Rantzau died. Herbert von Dirksen was appointed ambassador to Moscow, who in his memoirs described the ambassador's residence in Chisty Lane:

A modest one-story villa in a quiet side street suited our requirements: five living rooms, most of them small in size but well furnished (partly with our own furniture), a dining room capable of seating 25 people, several tiny meeting rooms, and on the top floor our bedroom and dressing room, downstairs excellent kitchen, garage and servants' quarters. In Moscow there was no need to organize crowded official dinners, and those guests who were going to a regular evening reception could not be difficult to accommodate in the available rooms, the location of which allowed those present to easily move from one room to another. The garden adjacent to the house was spacious enough to accommodate a tennis court.

In June 1941 the German diplomatic mission was expelled following the start of Operation Barbarossa and NKVD task force led by the head of the counterintelligence department, Captain Vasily Ryasny, carried out a thorough search, and all the documentation discovered during it was taken away. After this, the main house of the estate was sealed and remained empty for two years.

=== Patriarchal residence ===
On September 4, 1943, Soviet leader Joseph Stalin met with Metropolitans Sergius (Stagorodsky), Alexy (Simansky) and Nicholas (Yarushevich). Stalin raised the issue of providing the Moscow Patriarchate with premises and transport, in response to which Metropolitan Sergius asked to provide the abbot's building in the former Novodevichy Convent for the placement of the Patriarchate and the residence of the Patriarch. Stalin responded to this by offering a mansion in Chisty Lane:

No, that won't do. Comrade Karpov was there and examined everything. The building is poorly equipped, damp, cold, and requires major repairs. And we would like to provide you with equipped and prepared premises immediately. Therefore, tomorrow the mansion at Chisty Lane, building five, will come under your jurisdiction to house the Patriarchate... This is a Soviet building; before the war, the German ambassador to the USSR, Schulenburg, was only temporarily housed there. And besides, you will be provided with all the property located in it, and the territory adjacent to the house.

After this, Stalin's assistant Alexander Poskrebyshev read out a note describing the estate:

The main building of the estate is a one-story wooden house on a stone foundation, with a mezzanine and mezzanines. On the ground floor there are thirteen bright rooms, four dark closets and a corridor. A wooden staircase leads to a mezzanine, which has a dark room and three light ones. The usable area of the mansion was increased by installing mezzanines - low rooms in the mezzanine above the ground floor premises. The mezzanine has four bright rooms with eleven windows facing the courtyard. In the stone basement there are rooms for people, a kitchen, a dining room and a cook's room. The house has stove heating, water supply and sewerage. Behind the main building there is a small garden and a utility yard with two stone barns and service buildings: stables, cellars, storerooms, gatehouses and janitors' quarters.

On September 5, 1943, the buildings of the former estate were transferred to the Moscow Patriarchate along with furniture, decorations and household utensils.

In the right risalit of the main house of the estate, a Cross Church was built in the name of the Vladimir Icon of the Mother of God. According to the memoirs of Metropolitan Pitirim (Nechaev), “at first the temple was very simple: a lectern and only two icons. The iconostasis appeared only in 1957”. The main house was equipped with a meeting room of the Synod, called the “Red Hall,” workrooms for employees of the Moscow Patriarchate institutions, as well as the personal chambers of Patriarch Sergius. The Moscow diocesan administration, synodal departments and economic divisions of the Moscow Patriarchate were located in the one-story courtyard building located in the depths of the property.

On September 8, 1943, a Council of Bishops took place, in which 19 hierarchs took part, unanimously electing the Patriarchal Locum Tenens Metropolitan of Moscow and Kolomna Sergius (Stragorodsky) as Patriarch of Moscow and All Rus'. On September 20 of the same year, at the Patriarchal residence in Chisty Lane, foreign guests were received for the first time - a delegation of the Church of England led by Archbishop of York, Cyril Garbett.

On November 5 of the same year, Renovationist Archbishop Michael (Postnikov) brought repentance in the meeting room of the Holy Synod of the Russian Orthodox Church. Following him, other renovationist bishops began to repent. Repentance took place, as a rule, in the meeting room of the Holy Synod.

On May 15, 1944, at 6:50 a.m., that Patriarch Sergius suddenly died. At 8 o'clock on the same day, Metropolitan Nicholas (Yarushevich) of Krutitsy arrived here and performed the first litany at the bed of the deceased. From November 21 to 23, 1944, the Council of Bishops was held in this building, consisting of 50 bishops, the main purpose of which was to prepare the upcoming Local Council.

On February 2, 1945, the Local Council was meeting in the Church of the Resurrection of Christ in Sokolniki, elected Metropolitan Alexy (Simansky) as the new Patriarch of Moscow and All Rus'. Soon he moved into a residence in Chisty Lane. In the left risalit, where the cell of Patriarch Sergius was previously located, the personal library of Patriarch Alexy I was placed.

In 1948, the Moscow Patriarchate, after repeated petitions to the authorities, obtained permission to move the Moscow diocesan administration to the Lopukhinsky building of the Novodevichy Convent. The editorial office of the Journal of the Moscow Patriarchate moved to the premises at the Assumption Refectory Church of the Novodevichy Convent.

The Patriarchal residence in Chisty Lane of that time was described by the future regent of the Patriarchal Choir of the Cathedral of Christ the Saviour, Nikolai Georgiyevsky:

Through a small room to the left, with a desk for the attendant, a mirror and two Venetian chairs, we walked into the hall where the Patriarch’s home church was built in honor of the Vladimir Icon of the Mother of God. The scent of strong dewy incense prevailed here. Exactly at 10:30 in the morning, with the striking of the large grandfather clock in the sacristy, which adjoined the cross church, the internal doors opened and, leaning lightly on a stick, His Holiness Patriarch Alexy came out, making a general half-bow, thus greeting us and leading us around. smiling with his wonderful eyes, he walked to his place in the corner, where there was his chair and an eagle under his feet... The service took place in an hour - an hour and fifteen minutes. The Patriarch, smiling graciously, always said to those present: “Come to the table,” and went into the inner chambers. Then we went to the dining room, through the sacristy and the Red Hall, in which I always liked the image of the Holy Great Martyr and Victorious George on a horse, slaying the serpent, executed on glass. In a beautiful gilded frame, placed in front of the window “in the light”, the image looked like a very colorful stained glass window...This image was also very loved by His Holiness the Patriarch, who carefully transported it from besieged Leningrad to Moscow. There was never tension or silence at the table

.

Under Patriarch Pimen, the sacristy was rebuilt into a living room, called the White Hall where patriarchal vestments were kept in closed cabinets. On the mezzanine, Patriarch Pimen placed a collection of orders and gifts from his predecessor. Patriarch Pimen lived in this building permanently; he rarely went to his dacha in Peredelkino near Moscow, which appeared under his predecessor Alexy I; since Patriarch Pimen was limited in travel, he was called the “recluse of Chisty Lane”.

In 1983, the Moscow Patriarchate managed to obtain the right wing of the estate for use. On June 23, the consecration of a new administrative building took place in this building, which housed the administration of the affairs of the Moscow Patriarchate, the educational and pension committees of the Holy Synod.

In 1988, on the 1000th anniversary of the Baptism of Rus', a new official synodal residence was built and consecrated in the Danilov Monastery, but Patriarch Pimen lived in his residence in Chisty Lane, where he died on May 3, 1990.

By that time, the house in Chisty Lane had not been renovated for about twenty years, and the new Patriarch Alexy II, having inspected it, ordered repair work, and during this period he himself lived in the Patriarchal residence in Peredelkino, but later on Patriarch Alexy II did not live here, but only worked and received visitors and held meetings. By his own admission, made in 2005, "in 15 years I only spent the night in Chisty Lane once". The patriarchal residence in Chisty Lane began to be officially called the workers' residence. Here, according to tradition, the Patriarch voted, and with him the monks working in the residence. The ballot box was brought here from the nearest - 312th - polling station of the Voykovsky District of the Northern Administrative Okrug in Moscow.

Under Patriarch Alexy II, a tradition arose of erecting a Christmas tree on the eve of the winter holidays. A figurine of Grandfather Frost and a nativity scene were placed next to the tree. The Christmas tree was usually decorated by nuns who are assistants to the primate. Over the course of several years, the residence managed to accumulate a whole collection of New Year's decorations purchased by Alexy II. The Christmas tree in Chisty Lane was considered “intimate”; was staged for the inner circle of the Patriarch and specially invited guests.

After the death of Patriarch Alexy II, a commission was established to inventory the Patriarch's church property, which is stored in the sacristies of the patriarchal residences in Peredelkino and Chisty Lane near Moscow. Metropolitan Kirill (Gundyaev), who became the locum tenens of the Patriarchal Throne, came to Chisty and worked there, but the rooms that Patriarch Alexy occupied during his lifetime were sealed. The so-called White Hall was chosen as the office of the Locum Tenens, which was usually empty, sometimes only hosting the annual meetings of Patriarch Alexy II with journalists. On February 6, 2009, Patriarch Kirill removed the seals from the workrooms in the patriarchal residence in Chisty Lane.

Since the Patriarchal residence in Chisty Lane is too small for large delegations, Patriarch Kirill receives them in the Patriarchal chambers of the Cathedral of Christ the Savior.

Under Patriarch Kirill, the Patriarchal residence in Chisty Lane was for some time the place where clergy elected by the Holy Synod were named bishops.
