= St Elisabeth Convent, Minsk =

Russian Orthodox convent in Belarus

St Elisabeth Convent
- Свята-Елісавецінскі манастыр
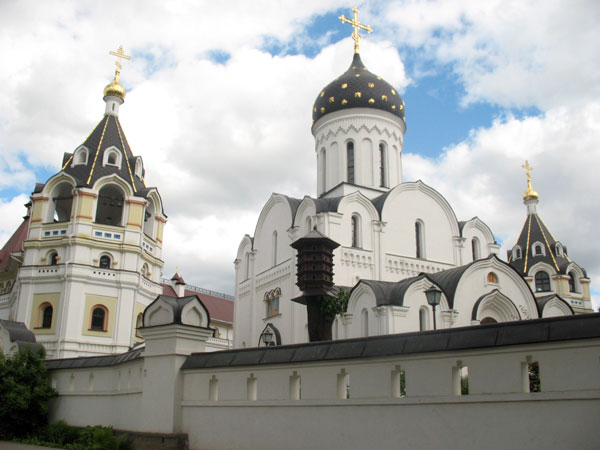
- Interactive map of St Elisabeth Convent

Monastery information
- Established: 1999
- Diocese: Diocese of Minsk (Belarusian Orthodox Church)

Site
- Public access: Accessible
- Website: http://obitel-minsk.org

St Elisabeth Convent (Belarusian: Свята-Елісавецінскі манастыр, Russian: Свято-Елисаветинский монастырь) is a Russian Orthodox convent on the outskirts of Minsk, Belarus. Currently, it is the only functioning monastery in the city.

== Convent Churches ==
- Church of the Reigning Icon of the Mother of God: consecrated on October 18, 2008 by Patriarch Alexy II of Moscow. Serves as the Convent's Katholikon. Patronal feast: March 15, New Style.
- Church of the Holy Martyr Grand Duchess Elisabeth Romanov: consecrated on January 2, 2005 and mainly used for everyday services. Patronal feast: July 18, New Style.
- Church of St. John of Shanghai and San Francisco: built on the territory of the National Mental Health Center and consecrated on June 2, 2019. Patronal feast: July 2, New Style.
- Crypt Church of St. Nicholas the Wonderworker: the first of the Convent's churches. Consecrated on January 10, 1999. Patronal feast: May 22 and December 19, New Style
- Church of the Holy Royal Martyrs: consecrated on October 13, 2012. Used for weekday services once a week and serves as a Baptistery. Patronal feast: July 17, New Style.
- Church of the "Inexhaustible Chalice" Icon of the Mother of God: built on the Convent farm in the village of Lysaya Gora, Minsk region and consecrated on January 3, 2010. Patronal east: May 18, New Style.
- Church of the Resurrection of the Righteous Lazarus "of the Four Days in the Tomb": located at the Northern Cemetery in Minsk. Consecrated on May 10, 2005. Patronal feast: Lazarus Saturday.
- Church of St. Sergius of Radonezh: located on the Convent farm near the village of Nelidovichi. Patronal feast: October 8, New Style.
- House Church of the Holy Blessed Xenia of St. Petersburg: located on the territory of residential care facility No. 3 for the elderly and the disabled in Minsk. Consecrated on February 6, 1998. Patronal feast: February 6, New Style.
- Church of St. Nektarios of Aegina: located on the territory of the boarding home for mentally and physically disabled children with special needs in Novinki (Minsk). Patronal feast: November 22, New Style.
- House Church of the Holy Martyrs Faith Hope and Love and Their Mother Sophia: located in the building of the St Elisabeth Convent Sunday school. Patronal feast: September 30, New Style
- House Church of the Kykkos (Merciful) Icon of the Mother of God: Patronal feast: November 25, New Style.

== Activities ==
The convent was founded in 1999 and was named after the holy martyr Elisaveta Fyodorovna Romanova. It has its beginning in the activities of the Sisterhood in honor of the same saint, established in 1996. The sisters were permitted to wear the white robes of the Sisters of Mercy, including for the collection of donations in the streets and selling religious items and items associated with monastic activities (honey, soft drinks, herbs, balms, and the like).

Currently, 130 nuns live in the convent. Men's and women's farmsteads accept former drug addicts, alcoholics and the homeless for temporary stay. The convent has a large retail chain in Belarus and actively trades in Europe and North America. Workshops produce church utensils, vestments, lay clothes, souvenirs and food. It owns a movable collapsible structure transported to various places and countries to hold sales of religious goods and souvenirs and offer puppet theatre performances to children.

The sisters provide spiritual support and assistance to patients of the Republican Center for Mental Health, the Second Clinical Hospital and other medical institutions, a psychoneurological boarding school, and a boarding school for children with special needs.

== Controversies ==
=== Nationalism (2017) ===
The convent used its retail network to promote the ideas of Russian irredentism and its head priest supported the capture of Crimea by Russia. In 2017, Russian GRU lieutenant colonel Anton Manshin gave a talk at the convent describing his participation in the Russian army's Chechen, Ukrainian, and Syrian campaigns and promoting the ideas of the Russian world. The editor of the convent's website later said that Manshin's invitation was their mistake. In the same year, the convent hosted an exhibition dedicated to the Russian Emperor Nicholas II and his family.

=== Collecting signatures for prohibition of homosexual propaganda (2019) ===
In November 2019, the convent joined the campaign of collecting signatures in an appeal to President Alexander Lukashenko to prohibit "propaganda and public demonstration of homosexuality and other sexual perversions to minors", and make such propaganda and public demonstration a criminal offence. Earlier, this appeal was initiated by pro-life organizations. It was also supported by Roman Catholic Archbishop, Tadevuš Kandrusievič. Signatures for the appeal were collected in the convent and at its retail outlets.

The convent's priest confessor, Archpriest Andrei Lemyashonak, produced a video address in which he warned against the evils spreading across Europe: same-sex marriages and the adoption of children by same-sex couples. He referred to them as the beginning of the end of the world. He called to stop this evil — imposing itself on young people and spoiling their lives and destroying families — from spreading to Belarus.

Lemyashonak took part in a press conference presenting the results of the campaign. In his speech, he stated that LGBT are sick people whose souls need to be prayed for. He said, that "there is no mother, nor father, nor sacramental life, nor examples of love" in their unions.

Some Orthodox priests criticised the convent's involvement into the campaign. Sergy Lepin, a spokesperson for the Belarusian Orthodox Church, stressed that the collection of signatures was not the convent's initiative, though the convent joined it. He confirmed that the Orthodox Church did not supported the campaign. He referred to Lemyashonak's video appeal as a "personal initiative". According to Lepin, "there should be no private initiatives in this direction." Pavel Siardzyuk, chairperson of the Synodal Commission of the Belarusian Orthodox Church on Family, Protection of Motherhood and Childhood, described the petition as discriminatory. He emphasised that supporting the campaign was "an initiative of solely St Elisabeth's convent."

=== COVID-19 outbreak (2020-21) ===
In April 2020, Belarusian and foreign media published reports of an outbreak of coronavirus in St Elisabeth Convent. The Belarusian government did not declare quarantine allowing all churches in the country remain open.

At a press conference on 14 April, the Belarusian Orthodox Church, Metropolitan Pavel, announced that Patriarch Kirill of Moscow had blessed the faithful to refrain from visiting churches. Metropolitan Pavel called on the Orthodox Christians of Belarus to adhere to the words of the Patriarch. He condemned the "pseudo-pastors" who called to ignore the Patriarch and to continue going to churches. He said all churches would remain open, but encouraged faithful to stay home during Holy Week and on Easter, and to follow services broadcast on television and online. He said the consecration of the dishes would take place in the open air.

Despite the warnings of the Patriarch and Metropolitan Pavel, the Easter services on 19 April were crowded, especially in the churches of St Elisabeth Convent, as evidenced by videos from the churches and confirmed by the convent's priest confessor, Archpriest Andrei Lemyashonak. Believers were given Communion with one spoon. On 23 April, Russian journalist Marina Akhmedova cited three nuns who reported that 970 people had received Communion with the same spoon in one of the convent's churches during the Easter service despite the cases of coronavirus had been registered in the convent. According to Akhmedova, 100 out of 130 nuns were in isolation, however she did not specify whether all the cases were due to the coronavirus infection.

On 20 April, a statement published on the convent's website denied the coronavirus cases among the convent's clerics and nuns and called the reports of such cases fake.

Sergy Lepin, a spokesperson for the Belarusian Orthodox Church, acknowledged that the safety of the St Elisabeth Convent's nuns and visitors had not been ensured.

On 30 April, the head of the Belarusian Orthodox Church, Metropolitan Pavel, addressed the clergy, monks, nuns and all laity, noting that not all of them followed the recommendations of the Ministry of Health and the Church's authorities with due attention and obedience. He called for the observance of the decrees of the Patriarch and the Holy Synod, and all previous instructions. He pointed out that negligence and deliberate disregard for sanitary norms, and calls to ignore the instructions of the Church's authorities during the epidemic were not evidence of faith, but rather "a crime against one's neighbor and therefore against God."

On the same day, 30 April, an article by Archpriest Lemyashonak was published on the St Elisabeth Convent's website. He urged the readers "not to shut oneself off from one's neighbor, but on the contrary, to come together and ask together for help with this disease. [...] If a person is destined to be infected, he will be infected. Sooner or later we will all leave this passing world."

On 21 May, the head of the polyclinic serving the convent told a journalist that in late April there were 59 positive tests for coronavirus among the convent's residents. Most cases were mild or asymptomatic. Several nuns were hospitalized and discharged by the time of the interview.

==== Vaccination scepticism ====
In the video shared on 6 June 2021, the convent's priest confessor, Archpriest Andrei Lemyashonak, announced that he would follow the country President's advice not to get vaccinated against Covid. He said that "neither illness is a random incident, nor death is random [...] all life — yours and mine — is in God's hands. Whether we get vaccinated or whatever else we do, we won't live a single additional minute on this earth."

=== Politically-motivated dismissals (2020) ===
The Christian Vision Working Group of the Coordination Council of Belarus reported about cases of political pressure on the clergy and staff of the convent during the socio-political crisis in Belarus after the presidential election in August 2020. At the general meeting of the convent on 18 August 2020, the convent's priest confessor Andrei Lemyashonak spoke in support of Alexander Lukashenko. He explained that the protests in the country were due to the conspiracy against the Russian Orthodox Church and warned that under Sviatlana Tsikhanouskaya there would be gay prides and same-sex marriages in Belarus. He stated that the people associated with the convent have univocal view on the events in Belarus, and those who do not like it should not feel obliged to stay. According to those reports, a significant number of employees were dismissed or left their posts within a few months of the meeting. In particular, a supply management specialist, Vitaly Leonovich, was fired.

The convent ceased collaboration with actor Alyaksandr Zhdanovich after he was detained by riot police and arrested for nine days. Zhdanovich was detained after appealing to the officer not to shout at the woman on the street; Zhdanovich was holding a small wooden cross in his hands. The actor was a longtime member of the convent parish. The convent denied reports of politically motivated dismissals, including the cessation of collaboration with Alyaksandr Zhdanovich.

=== Support of the Russian aggression against Ukraine ===
The Convent has been accused of raising funds for the Russian military in Eastern Ukraine. Archpriest Andrei Lemyashonak has been vocally supportive of Russia, having described the war as "a liberation struggle". In 2022, Ukrainians in Winchester, England issued complaints about the pro-Russian ties of St Elisabeth-based merchant nuns at a Christmas fair, leading to the fair's closure. The Convent has publicly denied supporting Russia's war in Ukraine.

In late 2025 and early 2026, the Church of Sweden issued warnings to its parishes urging them not to host nuns from the Convent, alleging their fundraising activities in Swedish churches raised money to support Russia's war in Ukraine and that the group has close ties to Russian military intelligence (GRU) and the Moscow Patriarchate. Swedish authorities raised concerns about the use of religious settings for pro-Russian influence operations.

=== Finances ===
In March 2024, the Buro Media investigation into the finances of the Convent was published. According to the investigation, the Convent understates the tax burden, disguises income as donations, and accepts payments mainly in cash. The authors of the investigation describe the Convent as an 'Orthodox business holding'.

== See also ==
- Testimonies of former novices and employees of the monastery (in Russian)
- St Elisabeth Convent of Minsk: Unveiling the Truth
