= Benjamin Tupieka =

Metropolitan of Minsk and Slutsk, Patriarchal Exarch of All Belarus

Vienijamin
- Exarch of the Belarusian Orthodox Church; Metropolitan of Minsk; Metropolitan of Barysaŭ
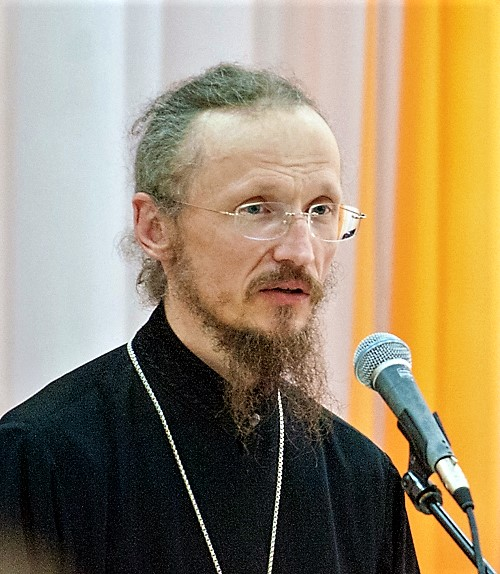
- Vienijamin in 2016
- Church: Russian Orthodox Church
- See: Belarus; Minsk; Barysaŭ
- Installed: 6 September 2020
- Predecessor: Paul Ponomaryov

Personal details
- Born: Vital Ivanavič Tupieka; 16 September 1968 (age 57) Luninets, Byelorussian SSR, Soviet Union (now Belarus)

Metropolitan Benjamin (Belarusian: Мітрапаліт Веніямі́н; Russian: Митрополит Вениамин, romanized: Mitropolit Veniamin; secular name Vital Ivanavič Tupieka (Belarusian: Віта́ль Іва́навіч Тупе́ка; Russian: Виталий Иванович Тупеко, romanized: Vitaly Ivanovich Tupeko; born 16 September 1968) is a Belarusian Orthodox bishop currently serving as Metropolitan of Minsk and as Patriarchal Exarch of the Belarusian Orthodox Church since 2020. He has also been Metropolitan of Barysaŭ since 2010. He is the first Belarusian to be head of the Belarusian Orthodox Church.

== Early life and career ==
Vital Ivanavič Tupieka was born on 16 September 1968 in the city of Luninets, then part of the Soviet Union. His father, Ivan Tupieka, was a police officer. He graduated from secondary school in 1985, and then studied at the Belarusian State University in Minsk. He later continued his studies at the Faculty of Radiophysics and Electronics. He graduated in 1992, specialising in radiophysics engineering. In August of the same year, Tupieka entered the first course of the Minsk Theological Seminary. After completing the third course in 1994, he was sent to Zhyrovichy Monastery. On 16 December 1994, he was christened under the name of Vienijamin (after Benjamin of Petrograd) by the deputy administrator of Zhyrovichy Monastery, and entered the monastery. On 9 January 1995, he was consecrated as a hierodeacon by Metropolitan Philaret during liturgical services at Zhyrovichy Monastery. On 13 February of the same year, he was promoted to hieromonk.

On 20 June 1996, Vienijamin was appointed as treasurer of the monastery. The same year, he graduated from the Minsk Theological Seminary with a bachelor's degree in theology from the Minsk Theological Academy, and was appointed as a teacher at the theological seminary. On 14 December 1999, he became a hegumen. On 12 January 2005, Vienijamin became part of the deanery of Zyrovichy Monastery. He was promoted to the title of archimandrite on 20 May 2006. On 1 July 2009, he became abbot of the Liady Monastery.

== Metropolitan of Barysaŭ (2010–present) ==
On 20 March 2010, Vienijamin became Metropolitan of the Diocese of Barysaŭ. The ceremony of his appointment was at the Cathedral of Christ the Saviour, supervised by Patriarch Kirill of Moscow. Three months later, he was appointed head of the publishing house of the Belarusian Orthodox Church. On 19 November 2014, he became a voting member of the Holy Synod of the Belarusian Orthodox Church. However, on 3 June 2015, he was removed from the Holy Synod and his positions as abbot of Liady Monastery and the publishing house of the BOC.

Since his appointment as Patriarchal Exarch of the BOC, Vienijamin has remained as Metropolitan of Barysaŭ on an acting basis.

== Patriarchal Exarch of the Belarusian Orthodox Church (2020–present) ==
Vienijamin was appointed as Patriarchal Exarch of the Belarusian Orthodox Church on 25 August 2020 by the Holy Synod of the Russian Orthodox Church. At the time of his appointment, he was the first Belarusian to serve as head of the BOC; his two predecessors, Filaret and Paul, had both been Russians. His appointment was confirmed by Patriarch Kirill at a Divine Liturgy in the Cathedral of Christ the Saviour on 6 September 2020.

In January 2022, Vienijamin was diagnosed with COVID-19, reportedly following a public event held with Belarusian President Alexander Lukashenko, according to Belarusian opposition organisation Christian Vision.

Vienijamin is a supporter of the All-Russian nation and Russian world ideology, having called for the unification of Belarus, Ukraine, and Russia into a singular country. He has promoted the policies of Alexander Lukashenko's government, including modifications to the Constitution of Belarus and anti-protest laws. Lukashenko praised Vienijamin for his support during the 2020–2021 Belarusian protests, claiming Vienijamin's support had stopped a conspiracy involving "almost all" Catholics and some Orthodox Christians.

Vienijamin has been criticised by members of the Belarusian opposition, such as Charter 97, for his refusal to condemn the 2022 Russian invasion of Ukraine. He criticised Belarusian Orthodox Church clergymen who protested against the crackdown on the 2020–2021 protests and signed the Appeal of the Clergy of the Russian Orthodox Church for Reconciliation and an End to War, stating that a priest "does not need to interfere" on political topics.
