= 1943 Bishops' Council of the Russian Orthodox Church =

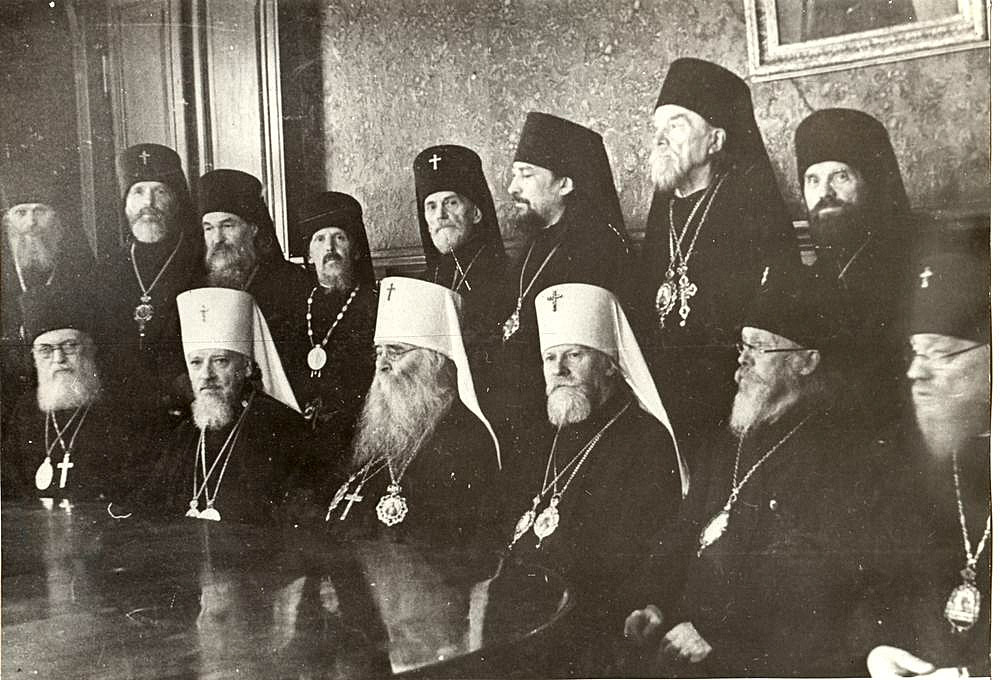
1943 meeting of the Bishops' Council of the Russian Orthodox Church

The 1943 meeting of the Bishops' Council of the Russian Orthodox Church held on September 8, 1943, was the first sobor of the Russian Orthodox Church since the 1917–18 Local Council. The assembly was held in Moscow in the Patriarchal Residence in Chisty Lane in Khamovniki District of the city, that just had been returned to the Moscow Patriarchate by the Soviet Government.

The assembly unanimously elected Metropolitan Sergius of Moscow and Kolomna to be the Patriarch of Moscow and all Rus'.

The assembly also excommunicated everyone who collaborated with the Axis powers, and reestablished the Holy Synod of the Russian Orthodox Church.

== Participants ==
The assembly was attended by 19 bishops: all the bishops of the Russian Orthodox Church who at that time held their positions on the territories not occupied by Nazi troops, except Bishop Photius (Topiro) of Kuban and Krasnodar, whose reasons of absence are unknown, and Archbishop Barlaam (Pikalov) of Sverdlovsk, assigned to his office from the Komi ASSR field-crop-walkers one day before the opening of the Council. Besides the bishops Archpriest Nikolai Kolchitsky, rector of the Yelokhovo Cathedral in Moscow also participated in the assembly. He became a Synod member as the head on the Property Management Directorate of the Moscow Patriarchate.

1. Sergius (Stragorodsky), Metropolitan of Moscow and Kolomna, locum tenens of the patriarchal throne
2. Alexius (Simansky), Metropolitan of Leningrad
3. Nicholas (Yarushevich), Metropolitan of Kiev and Galich
4. Luke (Voyno-Yasenetsky), Archbishop of Krasnoyarsk
5. John (Bratolyubov), Archbishop of Sarapul
6. Andrew (Komarov), Archbishop of Kazan
7. Alexius (Palitsyn), Archbishop of Kuybyshev
8. Stephen (Protsenko), Archbishop of Ufa
9. Sergius (Grishin), Archbishop of Gorky and Arzamas
10. John (Sokolov), Archbishop of Yaroslavl and Rostov
11. Aleksius (Sergeyev), Archbishop of Ryazan
12. Basil (Ratmirov), Archbishop of Smolensk and Kalinin
13. Bartholomew (Gorodtsov), Archbishop of Novosibirsk and Barnaul
14. Gregory (Chukov), Archbishop of Saratov and Stalingrad
15. Alexander (Tolstopyatov), Bishop of Molotov
16. Pitirim (Sviridov), Bishop of Kursk
17. Benjamin (Tikhonitsky), Bishop of Kirov
18. Demetrius (Gradusov), Bishop of Ulyanovsk
19. Eleutherius (Vorontsov), Bishop of Rostov

== See also ==
- Local Council of the Russian Orthodox Church
  - 1945 Local Council of the Russian Orthodox Church
