= Belarusian Orthodox Church =

Church in Belarus under jurisdiction of the Russian Orthodox Church

Belarusian Exarchate of the Moscow Patriarchate
- Беларускі Экзархат Маскоўскага Патрыярхата; Белорусский Экзархат Московского Патриархата
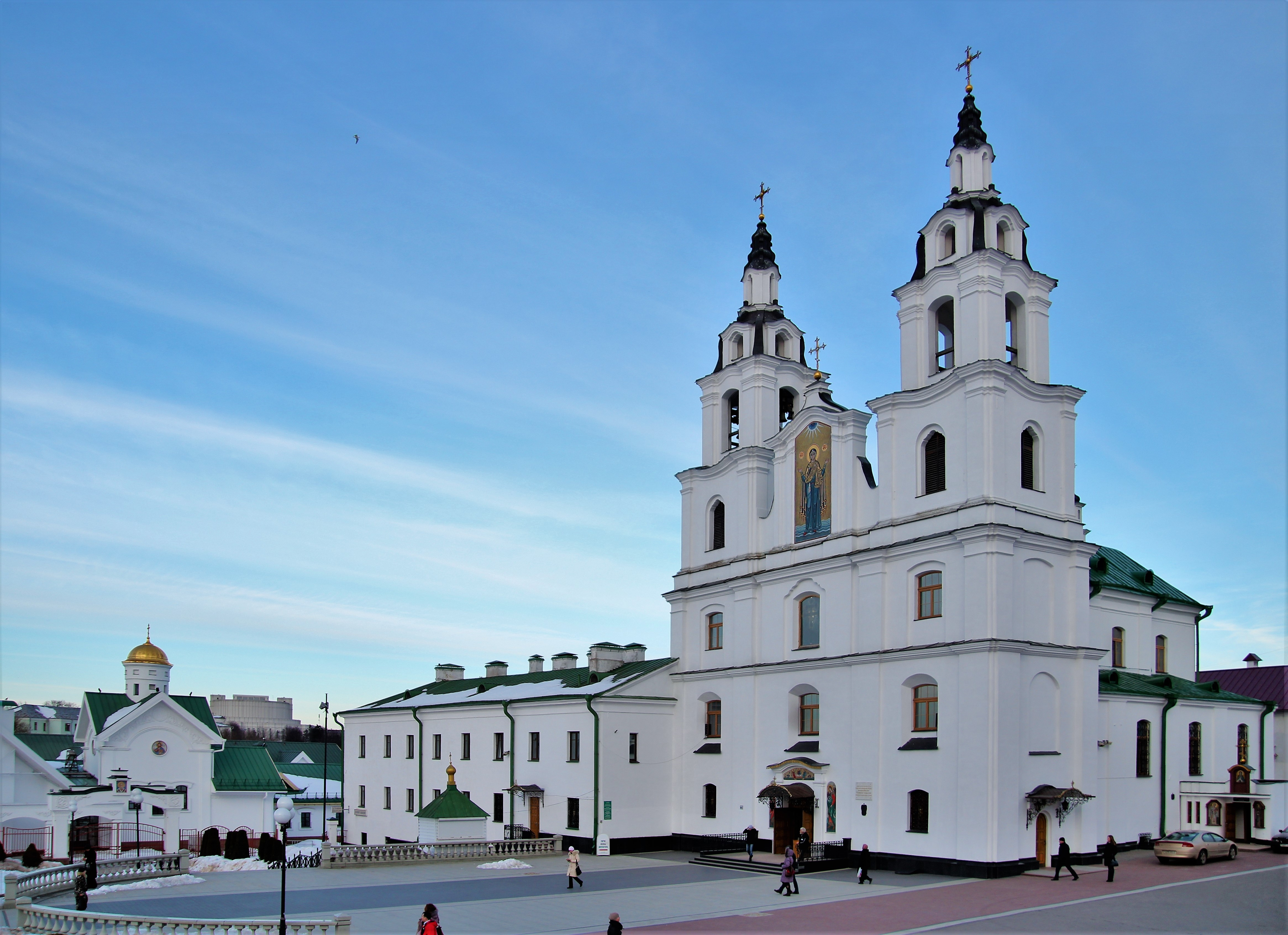
- The Holy Spirit Cathedral in Minsk
- Type: Exarchate
- Classification: Christian
- Orientation: Eastern Orthodox
- Scripture: Septuagint, New Testament
- Theology: Eastern Orthodox theology
- Polity: Episcopal
- Metropolitan: Benjamin Tupieka
- Bishops: 17 (2024)
- Parishes: 1,737 (2024)
- Priests: 1,676 (2019)
- Dioceses: 15 (2024)
- Monasteries: 36 (2024)
- Language: Church Slavonic; Russian; Belarusian
- Headquarters: Holy Spirit Cathedral, Minsk
- Territory: Belarus
- Origin: 16 October 1989 (autonomy granted by the Moscow Patriarchate)
- Recognition: Recognised as part of the Russian Orthodox Church
- Members: 81% of the Belarusian Christian population, according to own claims
- Official website: church.by

The Belarusian Orthodox Church (Note: Officially known as Byelorussian Orthodox Church.) (BOC; Belarusian: Беларуская праваслаўная царква, romanized: Biełaruskaja pravasłaŭnaja carkva, Russian: Белорусская православная церковь, romanized: Belorusskaya pravoslavnaya tserkov',) is the official name of the exarchate of the Russian Orthodox Church in Belarus. It represents the union of Russian Orthodox eparchies in the territory of Belarus and is the largest religious organization in the country, uniting the predominant majority of its Eastern Orthodox Christians.

Bishop Vienijamin (Vital Tupieka) became the Patriarchal Exarch of the Belarusian Orthodox Church in 2020.

== History ==
The Belarusian Orthodox Church (BOC) was established on 16 October 1989, on the foundation of the Minsk Eparchy. This occurred following decisions made at the 1989 Bishop's Council of the Russian Orthodox Church, which appointed Metropolitan Philaret as the Exarch of Belarus.

In 1990, Philaret and three other clergymen were elected to the Supreme Soviet. When their terms ended in 1995, the Synod of the BOC asked clergy not to run for public office again, and none did.

When Belarus declared independence in 1991 and was recognized by more than 50 states, Metropolitan Philaret said:

The independent Republic of Belarus has been revived! Its national symbols are restored, its spiritual values and cultural achievements are seen. It means that people did not lose their faith in God and their love for their Motherland.

Between 1988 and 2003, the BOC obtained 709 buildings through the transfer of former Soviet property to the Church.

The Church's role in Belarus was formally recognized in the 2002 Law on Religion, which stated that the BOC played a "determining role" in the development of the "state traditions of the Belarusian people". A year later, the BOC and the government signed a cooperation agreement

In the 2000s, the BOC proposed to change abortion law, introduce religious teaching in schools, and recognize doctoral degrees conferred by theological seminaries. Despite pro-Church rhetoric by state officials, these efforts were mostly unsuccessful, and the Church achieved only elective courses in schools. The Church's relationship with the Ministry of Education further worsened when the latter prohibited displays of religious symbols in educational institutions.

The BOC reiterated its ban on political activity by its clergy in 2011. A new Exarch, Paul, was appointed in 2013. Less than a year later, in 2014, he oversaw the creation of four new eparchies. Paul served until 2020, when Benjamin was appointed as the new Exarch.

== Structure ==
The Belarusian Exarchate is a national territorial organization of the Russian Orthodox Church. Its head, the Exarch, is elected by the Holy Synod of the Russian Orthodox Church. The Exarch can appoint bishops, which requires the approval of the Holy Synod, and establish new eparchies with the approval of the Bishops' Council of the Russian Orthodox Church.

As of 2024, the Belarusian Orthodox Church includes 1,737 Orthodox parishes, organized into 15 eparchies. It also oversees 6 theological educational institutions, 36 monasteries, 15 brotherhoods, 9 sisterhoods, and 1 mission. 1,878 Orthodox churches are active, with another 147 under construction. The BOC's episcopate includes 17 bishops, of whom one is retired and two are Vicar Bishops. Metropolitan Benjamin oversees two eparchies.

As of 2020, the Belarusian Orthodox Church was organized into 15 eparchies:

Structure of the BOC in 2020
Eparchy	Parishes	Monasteries	Priests	Deacons	Region	Year established
Turov	77	2	76	5	Gomel	1992
Slutsk	105	1	75	6	Minsk	2014
Polotsk	111	2	56	5	Vitebsk	1992
Pinsk	183	1	184	7	Brest	1989
Novogrudok	59	3	70	6	Grodno	1992
Molodechno	117	0	76	4	Minsk	2014
Mogilev	80	2	77	8	Mogilev	1989
Minsk	96	5	237	52	City of Minsk	1793
Lida	46	0	39	1	Minsk	2014
Grodno	103	0	120	9	Grodno	1992
Gomel	159	4	175	16	Gomel	1990
Vitebsk	185	6	150	47	Vitebsk	1992
Brest	203	4	210	20	Brest	1990
Borisov	120	3	101	9	Minsk	2014
Bobruisk	58	2	55	5	Mogilev	2004
Total	1702	35	1701	200		

Belarusian law establishes three tiers for registered religious groups. The smallest of them is a religious community, it needs at least 20 adults from the same or adjacent areas.

Number of the BOC religious communities over time
1991	1996	2005	2010	2015	2020	2024
603	938	1,315	1,509	1,643	1,709	1,737

== Exarchs ==
No.	Portrait	Primate	Term			Notes
No.	Portrait	Primate	Took office	Left office	Duration	Notes
1		Philaret; Kirill Varfolomeyevich Vakhromeyev (1935-2021)	16 October 1989	25 December 2013	24 years, 2 months and 9 days	Hero of Belarus (2006)
2		Paul; Georgiy Vasilevich Ponomaryov (born 1951)	25 December 2013	25 August 2020	6 years and 8 months	
3		Benjamin; Vital Ivanavič Tupieka (born 1968)	25 August 2020	Incumbent	6 years, 1 month and 20 days	First ethnically Belarusian exarch

== Polling ==
The percentage of the population identifying as Orthodox in Belarus rose from 22% in 1989 to 43.5% in 1993, then continued to increase to 67.4% in 2002 and 78.8% in 2010.

In 2010 8.2% of Orthodox attended Church weekly compared to 34.9% of Catholics in Belarus and 63.6% of Protestants.

According to a 2017 Pew Research, 73% of Belarus's population identifies as Orthodox, and 71% express pride in their religious identity. Among Orthodox believers, 17% consider religion very important in their lives, 12% attend church weekly, 22% pray daily, and 88% believe in God.

On the role of religion in public life, 44% support public funding for churches. While 42% believe the government should promote religious values, 50% disagree with this stance. 45% of Belarusians deem religion important for their national identity, the lowest among surveyed countries, compared to 57% in Russia and 64% in Poland.

According to a 2021 poll supported by Chatham House, the Orthodox Church was the second most trusted institution, behind independent media.

Public trust in the Orthodox Church
2003	2005	2007	2009	2011	2013	2015	2021
64.7	63.4	68.1	60.6	63.3	63.0	65.2	45.4

== Criticism and controversies ==
In 2023, the exiled Rada of the Belarusian Democratic Republic described the BOC as a "Russian colonial institution". The Rada also said that the church supported the Russian invasion of Ukraine, failed to condemn human rights abuses by the Lukashenko government, and enjoyed privileges while other denominations were repressed.

In 2022 and 2023, the Orthodox St Elisabeth Convent in Minsk has been holding public events supporting the Russian invasion of Ukraine and raised funds to support Russian troops. The convent has also been involved in promoting homophobia, and other controversies.

== See also ==
- Religion in Belarus
- Catholic Church in Belarus
- Belarusian Evangelical Reformed Church
- Freedom of religion in Belarus
