= Minsk Theological Academy =

University of Applied Sciences

- Минская духовная академия Мінская духоўная акадэмія
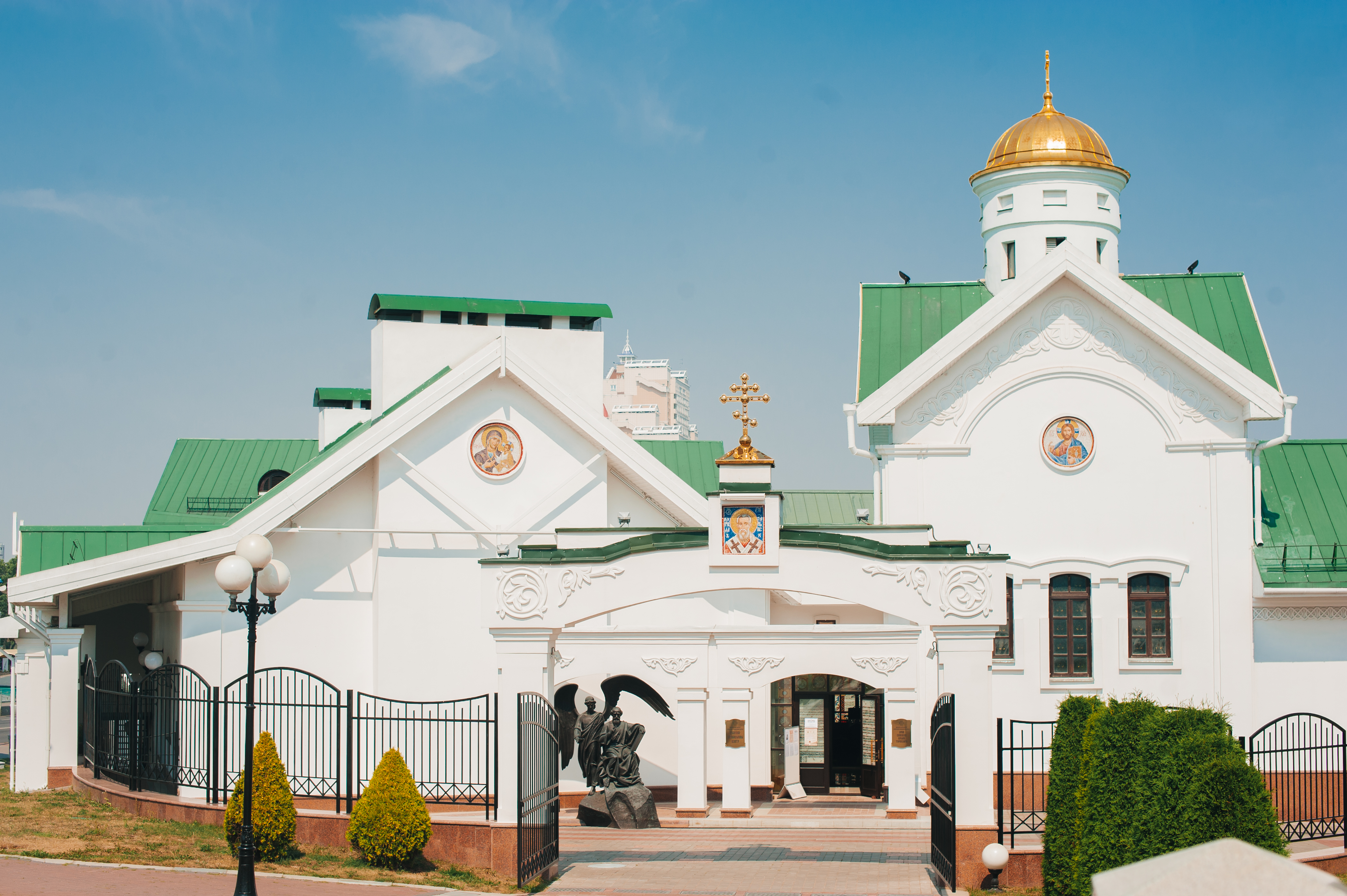
- Type: Seminary
- Established: 1996
- Location: Minsk, Belarus; 53.90569°N 27.55594°E
- Website: minda.by

Minsk Theological Academy (Russian: Минская духовная академия имени святителя Кирилла Туровского, Belarusian: Мінская духоўная акадэмія імя свяціцеля Кірылы Тураўскага) is a university of Applied Sciences of the Belarusian Exarchate of the Russian Orthodox Church. It was named after Saint Kirill of Turov. Geographically located within the Church of the Assumption in Žyrovičy (also Zhyrovichy), Slonim District, Grodno Voblast.

The Academy is a private educational institution. Its training programs comply with the standards and regulations set by the Education Committee of the Holy Synod of the Russian Orthodox Church. The standard duration of study at the Academy is three years. In the future, there are plans to relocate the Academy to Minsk.

== History ==
In 1996, the Holy Synod of the Russian Orthodox Church, having heard the report of Metropolitan of Minsk and Slutsk, Patriarchal Exarch of all Belarus Philaret (Vakhromeyev), on the meeting of the Synod of the Belarusian Exarchate of 3 February 1996 (№ 34), "blessed the start of the Minsk Theological Academy". The first issue of the Minsk Theological Academy took place in September 1999.

From 1996 to 2015, the Academy was based in Zhyrovichy Monastery.
