= 1945 Local Council of the Russian Orthodox Church =

Council of the Russian Church in 1945

NKGB Directive No. 122, on the 1945 Local Council.

The 1945 Local Council of the Russian Orthodox Church took place in the period from January 31 to February 4, 1945, in Moscow, in the Church of the Resurrection in Sokolniki District of the city. The assembly was attended by all registered bishops of the Russian Orthodox Church, together with representatives of the clergy and laity of their dioceses. Among the honored guests present at the Council were patriarchs of Alexandria (Christopher II), Antioch (Alexander III), Georgia (Callistratus), and representatives of Constantinople, Jerusalem, Serbian and Romanian churches. To the meeting were also sent 2 representatives of the North American archdiocese, but due to wartime travel difficulties they missed the meeting. At the Council, 171 people attended from various dioceses and provinces. In the list is the 61 dioceses in the USSR and one overseas (North American). In this meeting ruling bishops in the USSR was only 44. The right to vote at the Council was given to some bishops.

The meeting was promoted in Soviet propaganda as an example of freedom of religion in the Soviet Union. For the successful conduct of the meeting Georgy Karpov, chairman of the Council for the Affairs of the Russian Orthodox Church (CAROC) at the Sovnarkom, was awarded the Order of the Red Banner of Labour.

== See also ==
- Bishops' Council of the Russian Orthodox Church
  - 1943 Bishops' Council of the Russian Orthodox Church
