= 1917–18 Local Council of the Russian Orthodox Church =

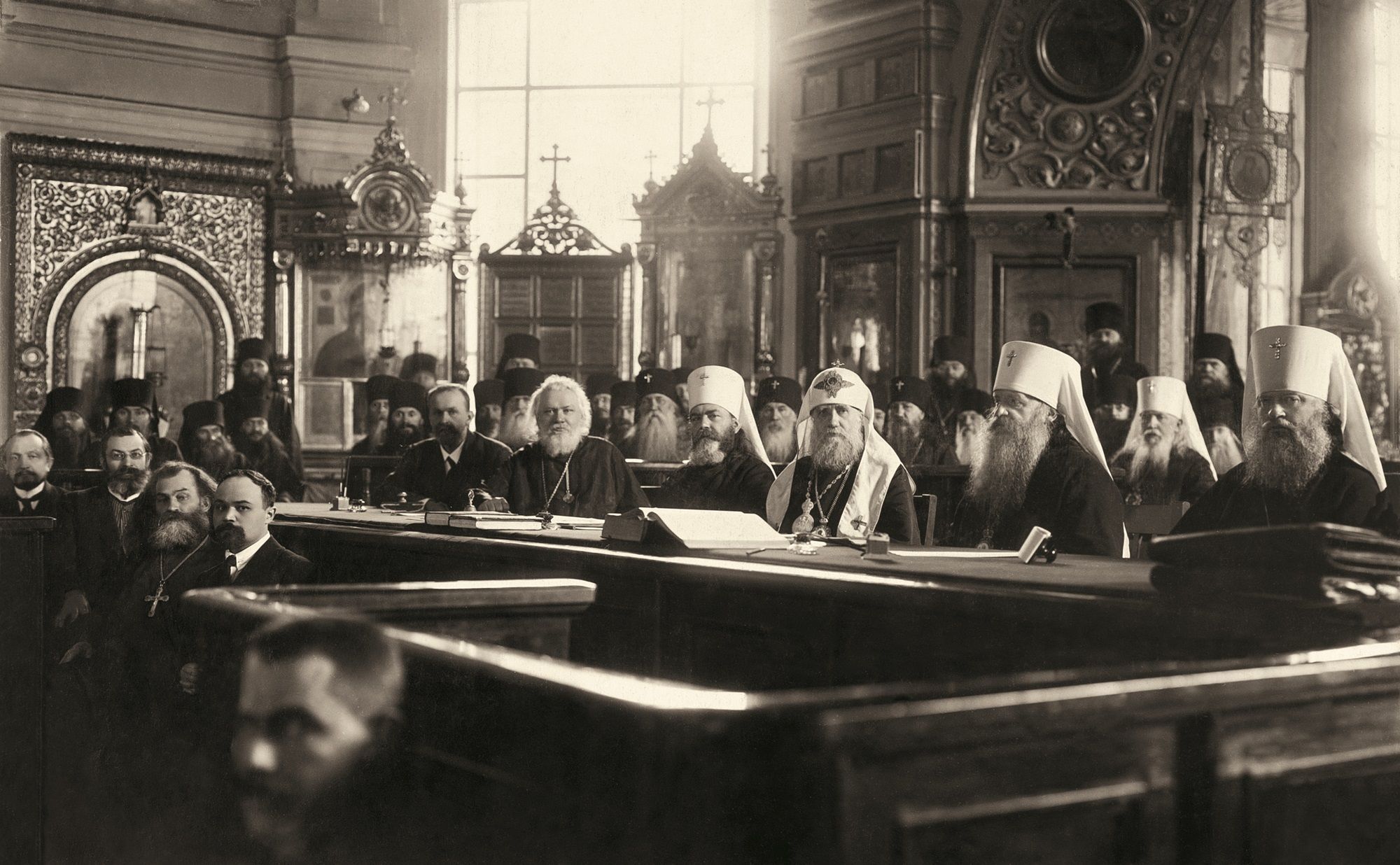
A session of the 1917–18 Local Council

The 1917–1918 Local Council of the Orthodox Church of Russia (Russian: Поместный собор Православной российской церкви) was the first Local Council of the Russian Church since the end of the 17th century. It opened on 15 August 1917 (O.S.) in the Assumption Cathedral of the Moscow Kremlin. Its most important decision was to restore the Patriarchate in the Russian Church, thereby ending a period of c. 200 years when the Russian Church was governed directly by the Emperor through the Most Holy Synod as a result of Peter the Great's ecclesiastical reforms.

== Background and overview ==
The council's sessions were held from August 1917 until mid-September 1918, mainly in the Moscow Diocesan House in Likhov Lane in Moscow. The Council coincided with important events in Russian history such as the continuation of the war with Imperial Germany, the Kornilov affair in August 1917, the proclamation of the Republic in Russia (1 September 1917), the fall of the Provisional Government and the October Revolution, the dispersal of the Constituent Assembly, the publication of the Decree on Separation of Church and State and the beginning of the Civil War. The Council acted in response to some of these events. The Bolsheviks, whose actions were directly condemned by the council (or personally by the Patriarch), did not put direct obstacles to the sessions of the council.

The council, preparation for which had begun in the early 1900s, opened when antimonarchist sentiments both in society and in the Church were dominant. The Council comprised 564 members, including 227 from the bishops and clergymen, 299 from the laity. It was attended by the head of the Provisional Government, Alexander Kerensky, Interior Minister Avksentiev, representatives of the press and the diplomatic corps.

== Restoration of Patriarchate ==
The first session of the council, which lasted from August 15 to 9 December 1917, was devoted to the reorganization of higher church management: restoration of the patriarchate, the election of the patriarch, the determination of his rights and duties, the institution of the cathedral authorities to work together with the Patriarch in management of church affairs, as well as discussion of the legal position of the Orthodox Church in Russia.

The debate on the restoration of the Patriarchate was not a foregone conclusion at the beginning: opponents of the patriarchate pointed to the threat that it could pose to the conciliar nature of the Russian Church and even to the danger of absolutism in the Church; Professor Nikolai Kuznetsov believed that there was a real danger that the Holy Synod, as an executive authority acting in the period between the Councils, might turn into a simple advisory body under the Patriarch, and that that would also be a diminution of the rights of bishops members of the Synod. But the issue gained urgency right after the Bolsheviks seized power in Petrograd on 25 October; and three days after, the debates were suspended and the decision to restore the Patriarchy in the ROC passed on 28 October (O.S.).

On 5 November of the same year, after election as one of the three candidates for the reinstated Moscow Patriarchate, Tikhon Belavin, Metropolitan of Moscow, was selected after a drawing of lots as the new Patriarch of Moscow and all Rus'.

== Literature ==
- Собрание определений и Деяния Священного Собора Православной Российской Церкви 1917—1918 гг.. Moscow, 1994—2000 (scanned text: Священный Соборъ Православной Россійской Церкви. Собраніе опрдѣленій и постановленій. М. 1918. — Изданіе Соборнаго Совѣта)
