= Diocese of Kaluga =

Diocese of Kaluga Калужская епархия
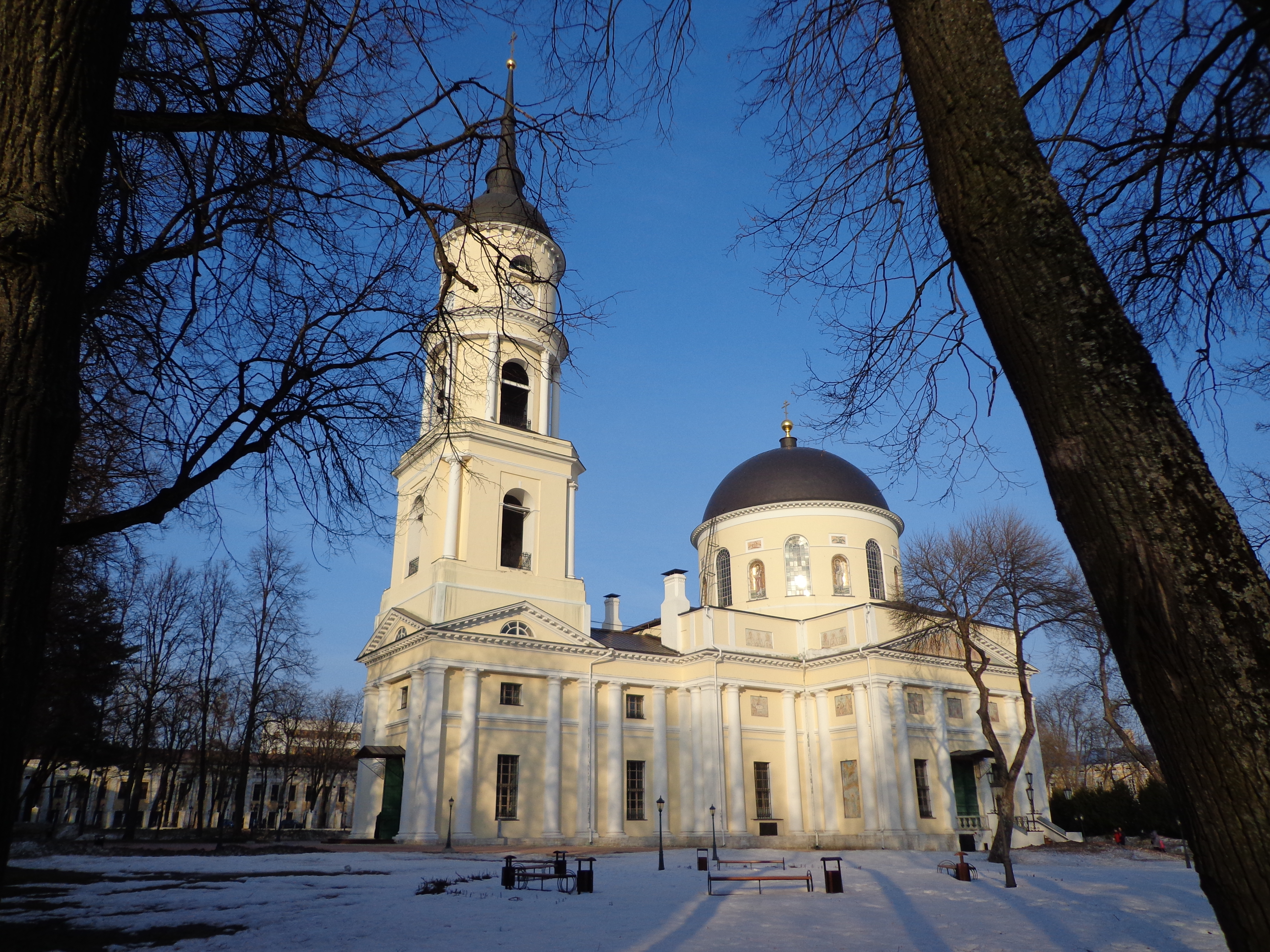
- Trinity Cathedral in Kaluga

Location
- Deaneries: 11
- Headquarters: Kaluga

Information
- Denomination: Eastern Orthodox
- Sui iuris church: Russian Orthodox Church
- Established: 16 October 1799
- Cathedral: Trinity Cathedral
- Language: Church Slavonic

Current leadership
- Governance: Eparchy
- Bishop: Kliment (Kapalin) since 1990

Website
- eparhia-kaluga.ru

The Diocese of Kaluga (Russian: Калужская епархия) is an eparchy of the Russian Orthodox Church. It is a part of the Don Archdiocese, founded in 2011 and consists of various parishes and monasteries in Kaluga Oblast.

== History ==
Established October 16, 1799; Previously, the territory was mainly part of the Krutitsa Diocese (Russian: Крутицкая епархия).

After the Second World War, the number of churches in the diocese reached 25. During a new repression wave on the Church, which started in 1958 number of churches and monasteries in the eparchy were closed. Registration of parish communities resumed only in 1988, the year of the millennium of the Baptism of Rus'. At the beginning of 2010, the diocese had 186 active parishes, 6 monasteries, and 2 monasteries. In addition, on the territory of the diocese, there are two stauropegial monasteries: Optina Hermitage and Kazan Amvrosievskaya Hermitage.

On October 2, 2013, the independent Diocese of Kozelsk and Diocese of Pesochensk were separated from the Kaluga Diocese, all three dioceses became part of the newly formed Kaluga Metropolis. The parishes of Duminichsky, Zhizdrinsky, Kozelsky, Lyudinovsky, Sukhinichsky, Ulyanovsky, Khvastovichsky, Baryatinsky and Yukhnovsky districts were removed from the Kaluga diocese.

By order of the Metropolitan of the Kaluga Diocese on November 12, 2013 (No. 178), deaneries were formed in the territory of the diocese, and the following deans were appointed:

8th district (Medyn deanery): Medynsky district. Dean - Priest Alexander Zemtsov; 9th district (Przemysl deanery): Przemysl district. Dean - Priest Dionysius Dobrov; 10th district (Babyninsky deanery): Babyninsky and Meshchovsky districts. The dean is Archpriest Sergius Yanin.

== Bishops ==
- October 16-21, 1799 - Serapion (Alexandrovsky)
- October 30, 1799 - March 5, 1809 - Theophylact (Rusanov)
- April 16, 1809 - May 2, 1813 - Evlampy (Vvedensky)
- June 9, 1813 - February 7, 1816 - Evgeny (Bolkhovitinov)
- February 7, 1816 - March 15, 1819 - Anthony (Sokolov)
- June 1, 1819 - January 12, 1825 - Filaret (Amphitheaters)
- January 4, 1826 - May 20, 1828 - Grigory (Postnikov)
- May 20, 1828 - September 9, 1831 - Gabriel (Gorodkov)
- September 9, 1831 - September 8, 1834 - Nikanor (Klementyevsky)
- October 26, 1834 - September 15, 1851 - Nikolai (Sokolov)
- October 13, 1851 - April 13, 1881 - Grigory (Mitkevich)
- May 14, 1881 - May 2, 1888 - Vladimir (Nikolsky)
- May 2, 1888 - June 3, 1890 - Anastasy (Dobradin)
- June 3, 1890 - October 30, 1892 - Vitaly (Iosifov)
- October 30, 1892 - January 24, 1894 - Anatoly (Stankevich)
- January 24, 1894 - October 8, 1895 - Alexander (Svetlakov)
- October 10, 1895 - June 20, 1901 - Makariy (Troitsky)
- July 10, 1901 - December 31, 1910 - Veniamin (Muratovsky)
- December 31, 1910 - June 25, 1912 - Alexander (Golovin)
- June 25, 1912 - May 13, 1913 - Tikhon (Nikanorov)
- May 13, 1913 - July 5, 1916 - Georgy (Yaroshevsky)
- July 19, 1916 - September 29, 1927 - Feofan (Tulyakov)
- September 29, 1927 - July 10, 1928 - Stefan (Znamirovsky)
- August 12 - December 12, 1928 - Pavel (Vvedensky)
- January 1, 1929 - September 16, 1930 - Sylvester (Bratanovsky)
- December 2, 1930 - June 16, 1933 - Peacock (Kroshechkin)
- June 29, 1933 - April 5, 1934 - Dimitry (Dobroserdov)
- April 9, 1934 - November 23, 1937 - Augustin (Belyaev)
- 1937-1942 - The position was vacant.
- January 10, 1942 - July 14, 1943 - Pitirim (Sviridov)
- July 14, 1943 - May 1, 1944 - Alexy (Sergeev) temporary, Archbishop of Ryazan
- September 1945 - March 22, 1960 - Onisifor (Ponomarev)
- March 22, 1960 - July 19, 1962 - Leonid (Lobachev)
- July 19, 1962 - April 28, 1963 - Stefan (Nikitin) temporary, bishop b. Mozhaisky
- May 14 - May 29, 1963 - Leonid (Lobachev)
- May 29, 1963 - November 25, 1965 - Ermogen (Golubev)
- November 25, 1965 - April 17, 1975 - Donat (Shchegolev)
- April 17, 1975 - June 11, 1977 - Nikolai (Kutepov)
- June 11, 1977 - July 16, 1982 - Nikon (Fomichev)
- July 16, 1982 - July 20, 1990 - Ilian (Vostryakov)
- from July 20, 1990 - Kliment (Kapalin)
