= Diocese of Minsk (Belarusian Orthodox Church) =

Eparchy of the Belarusian Orthodox Church

Coordinates: 53.9000°N 27.5500°E

Diocese of Minsk Мінская епархія
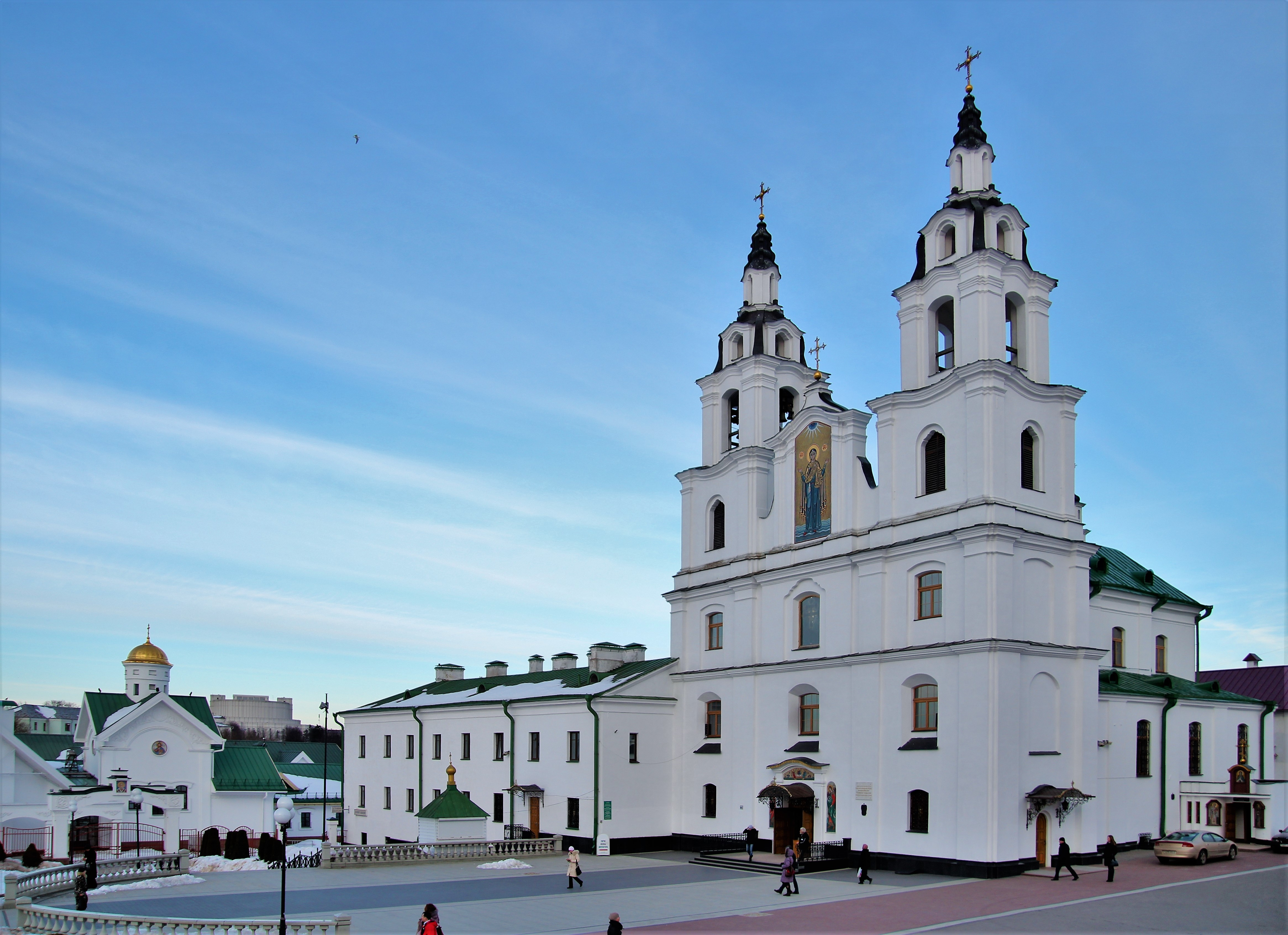
- the Holy Spirit Cathedral in Minsk, the diocese's cathedral

Location
- Country: Belarus
- Territory: Minsk, Minsk District
- Subdivisions: 10 deaneries

Statistics
- Area: 2,348 km^{2} (907 sq mi)
- Parishes: 94

Information
- Established: 13 April 1793
- Cathedral: Holy Spirit Cathedral

Current leadership
- Metropolitan: Vienijamin (Tupieka)

Map
- Diocese of Minsk

Website
- pravminsk.by

The Diocese of Minsk (Russian: Минская епархия; Belarusian: Мінская епархія) is an eparchy of the Belarusian Orthodox Church, which is an exarchate of the Russian Orthodox Church.

== History ==
The diocese was established by the Supreme decree of 13 April 1793. It was established for the regions, which became part of the Russian Empire at the second partition of Poland, instead of Turov diocese, remained until 1798 in the conduct of the Kiev Metropolitanate, and also the bishoprics in Slutsk, formerly frontiers of the Kingdom of Poland. Initially, the Department was located in Slutsk, was moved to Minsk by decree on 12 April 1795, but according to Stepan Runkevich, in fact, it moved to Minsk only on 3 September 1799. Soon the Minsk diocese also included the Lithuanian regions that were regions that were included in Russia during the third partition of Poland. Thus it became extremely large, and the reunion with the Orthodox Church of one and a half million Western Russian Uniates made it even larger. Already in 1795, it was found necessary to separate the independent of Bratslav diocese and Zhytomyr vicar see from the Minsk diocese, with the latter becoming independent on 16 October 1799.

In 1832, the territory of the Vilna Governorate moved from Diocese of Minsk to the newly established Diocese of Polotsk, and in 1840, after the second unification of the Uniates with the Synod of Polotsk, the Minsk diocese entered the borders of the Minsk Governorate.

Since 1922, the Minsk diocese has been a Metropolitan see. In the second half of the Soviet period, it occupied the territory of the entire Byelorussian SSR. On 6 July 1989, the Mogilev, Pinsk and Polotsk dioceses were separated from the Minsk diocese, after which the Minsk and Grodno regions remained under the jurisdiction of the Minsk see. On 18 February 1992, the Grodno and Novogrudok dioceses were also separated, after which the borders of the Minsk diocese coincided with the borders of the Minsk Region.

On 23 October 2014, the independent Barysaw, Maladzyechna and Slutsk dioceses were separated from the Minsk diocese, which left the city of Minsk and the Minsk District under the jurisdiction of the Minsk diocese. At the same time, the Minsk diocese became part of the newly-formed Minsk metropolis.

== Historical names ==
- Minsk, Izyaslav and Bratslav (13 April 1793 - 12 April 1795)
- Minsk and Volhynia (12 April 1795 - 4 August 1799)
- Minsk and Lithuania (1799 - 30 April 1830)
- Minsk and Grodno (30 April 1830 or 1833 - 4 February 1839)
- Minsk and Bobruisk (4 February 1839 or 1843 - 6 April 1878)
- Minsk and Turov (6 April 1878-1928)
- Minsk (1928-1930)
- Minsk and Belarus (1930 - 16 October 1989)
- Minsk and Grodno (16 October 1989 - 18 February 1992)
- Minsk and Slutsk (18 February 1992 - 23 October 2014)
- Minsk and Zaslawye (since 23 October 2014)

== Literature ==
- Рункевич С. Г. История Минской архиепископии (1793—1832 гг.) — Санкт-Петербург: Типография А. Катанского и К°, 1893
- Иерей Евгений Свидерский, Г. Шейкин Минская епархия Белорусского Экзархата: история и современность // Журнал Московской Патриархии. 2008. — № 7. — C. 44—73.
- Sipovič, Č. (1970). "The Diocese of Minsk, its Origin, Extent and Hierarchy". The Journal of Byelorussian Studies. II (2): 177–191.
