= Holy Spirit Cathedral, Minsk =

Belarusian Orthodox cathedral in Minsk

Holy Spirit Cathedral
- Кафедральны сабор Сашэсця Святога Духа
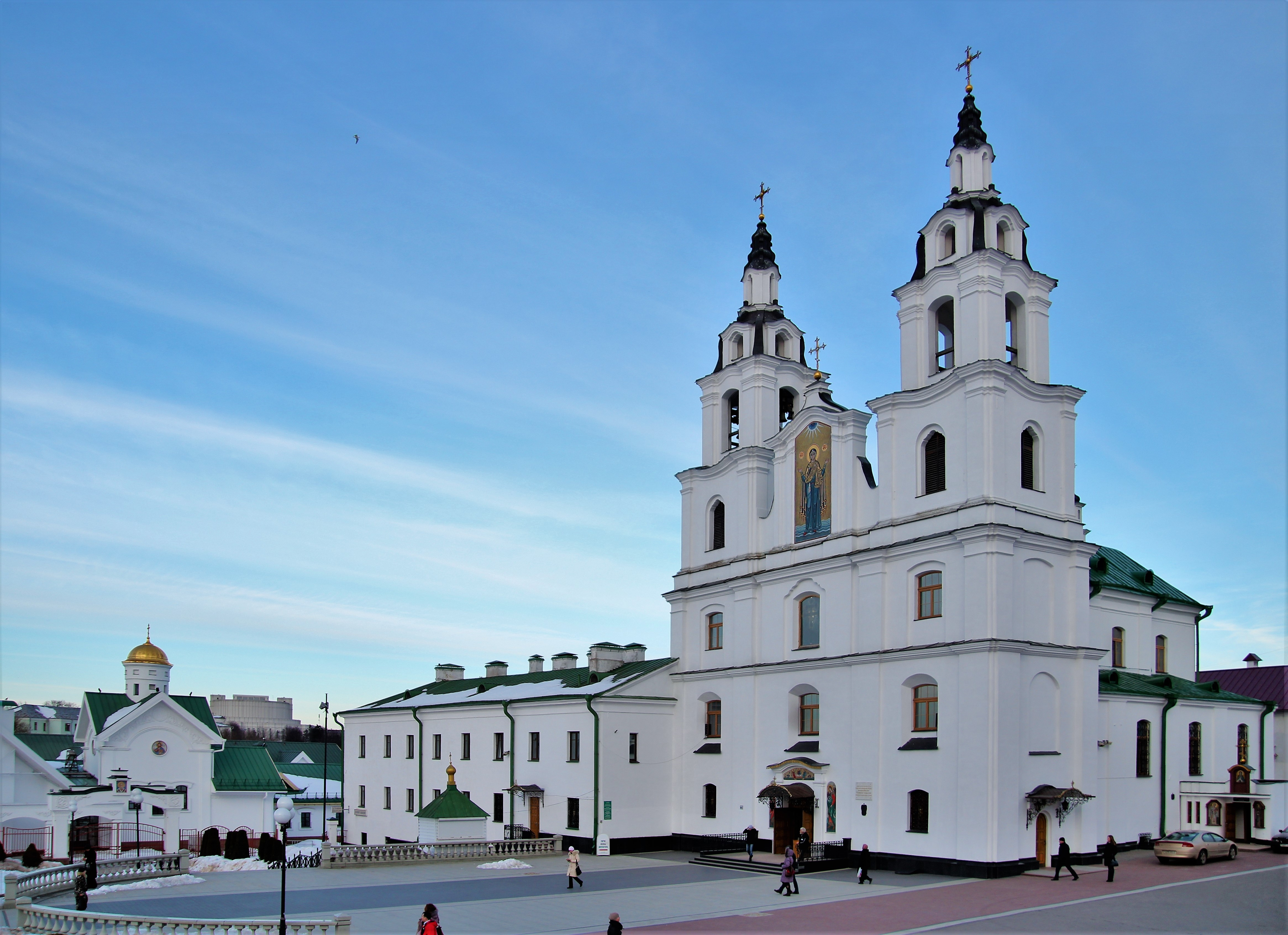
- The cathedral in 2013
- Holy Spirit Cathedral
- 53.9050°N 27.5562°E
- Country: Belarus
- Denomination: Belarusian Exarchate of the Russian Orthodox Church
- Website: https://sabor.by/

Architecture
- Style: Sarmatian Baroque
- Years built: 1633—1642
- Closed: 1741

The Holy Spirit Cathedral or the Holy Ghost Cathedral (Belarusian: Кафедральны сабор Сашэсця Святога Духа) is a cathedral in Minsk, Belarus. Consecrated in honour of the Holy Spirit, it the mother church of the Belarusian Orthodox Church.

It was built between 1633 and 1642 as a part Bernardine monastery during the Polish–Lithuanian Commonwealth in a place of former male Orthodox monasteries. The site became Orthodox again in 1860. The cathedral is listed as a Belarusian Cultural heritage object and is considered one of the main landmarks in Minsk Upper city.

== History ==
=== Bernardine monastery ===
Before 1596 on the site of the Holy Spirit Cathedral was an Orthodox male monastery consecrated in the name of saints Cosmas and Damian. The monastery also owned nearby lands on the eastern border of old Minsk and served as a military defense for the city. Its memory was preserved in the name of the nearby street of Cosmas and Damian, which bore this name until 1931 (during World War II all the buildings on the street were destroyed and the street disappeared).

In the early 17th century the monastery with all lands was given to the Ruthenian Uniate Church, but Uniates were unpopular among locals and the authorities decided to give the monastery to the Bernardine order. At that time all the buildings in Minsk were wooden, and the city suffered from constant fires. The Bernardines built the stone Holy Spirit Cathedral between 1633 and 1642; by 1652 they had constructed a stone convent. The complex was severely damaged during the Russo-Polish War of 1654–1667, then restored and reconsecrated in August 1687.

The church was damaged by fire in 1741, but the most destructive fire happened on May 30, 1835. Through the monastery it took over the entire city centre and destroyed many historical buildings and houses of common people. The Bernardines could not restore the church in its original form. By 1852 the order decided to close the monastery. The remaining nuns were transferred to Nesvizh and the monastery was abandoned until 1860.

On May 3, 2022, a monument to Metropolitan Filaret was unveiled near the Holy Spirit Cathedral. Attending the ceremony was Belarusian President Alexander Lukashenko.

=== Christian church ===
In 1860 the monastery was returned to the Orthodox Church. In 1869 the city treasury gave 13,000 roubles for the restoration. In a year the works were finished and the church was consecrated on October 22, 1870. The monastery was given to monks from the Holy Trinity Monastery of Slutsk. They brought several valuable relics, including Our Lady of Minsk (Icon).

=== 20th century ===
In 1918 the church was closed and most of the churchware disappeared. The building was then used as a gym for local firefighters.

The church was opened during the Nazi occupation of Belarus in 1942. In the 1950s the building was restored. In 1961 the church became a cathedral of the Minsk diocese, and was then promoted to central cathedral of the Belarusian Orthodox Church. A new altar was installed in the south part of the church in 1968.

== Relics ==
The iconostasis holds several important relics, of which the most valuable is Our Lady of Minsk (Icon) from 1500. The incorruptible relics of Sophia Olelkovich Radziwill, the granddaughter of Princess Anastasia Slutskaya, are displayed in the side niche on the left side of the altar.

== Gallery ==
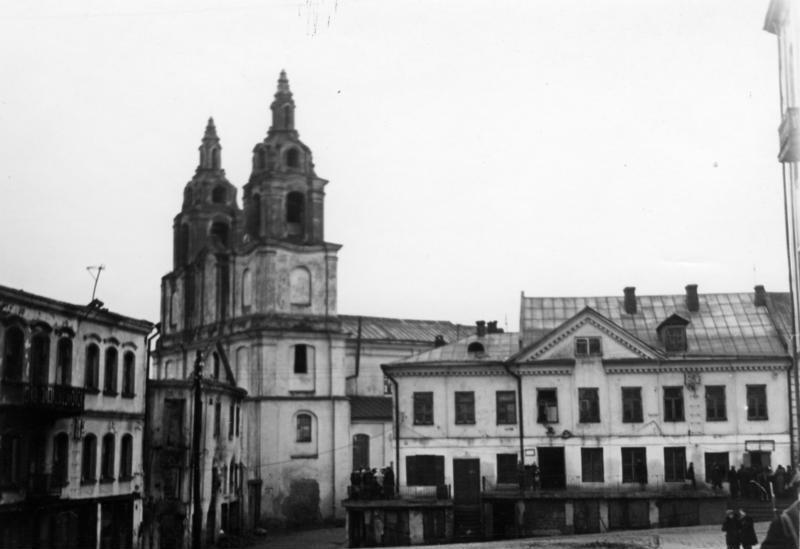
1941 photo

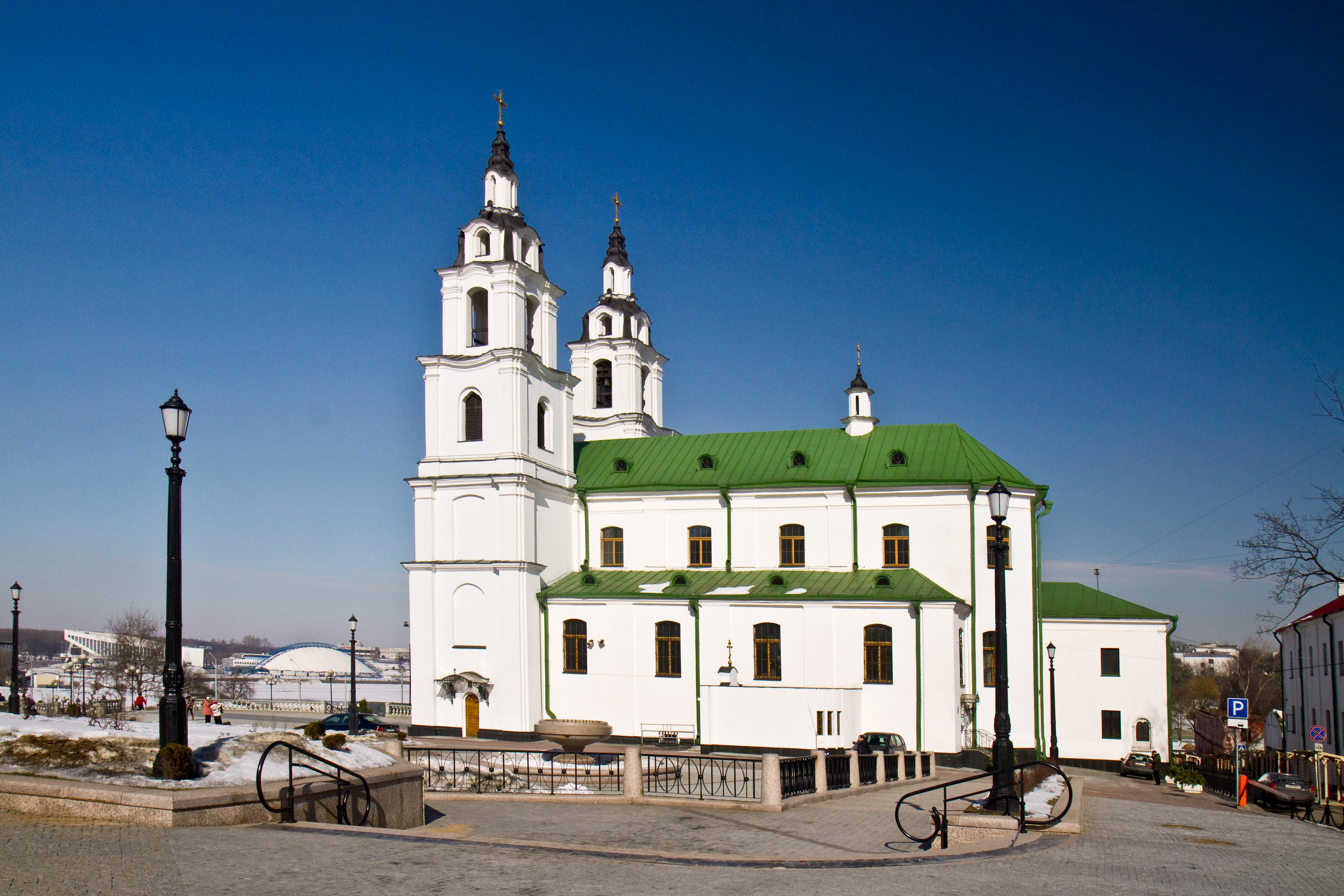
2010 photo

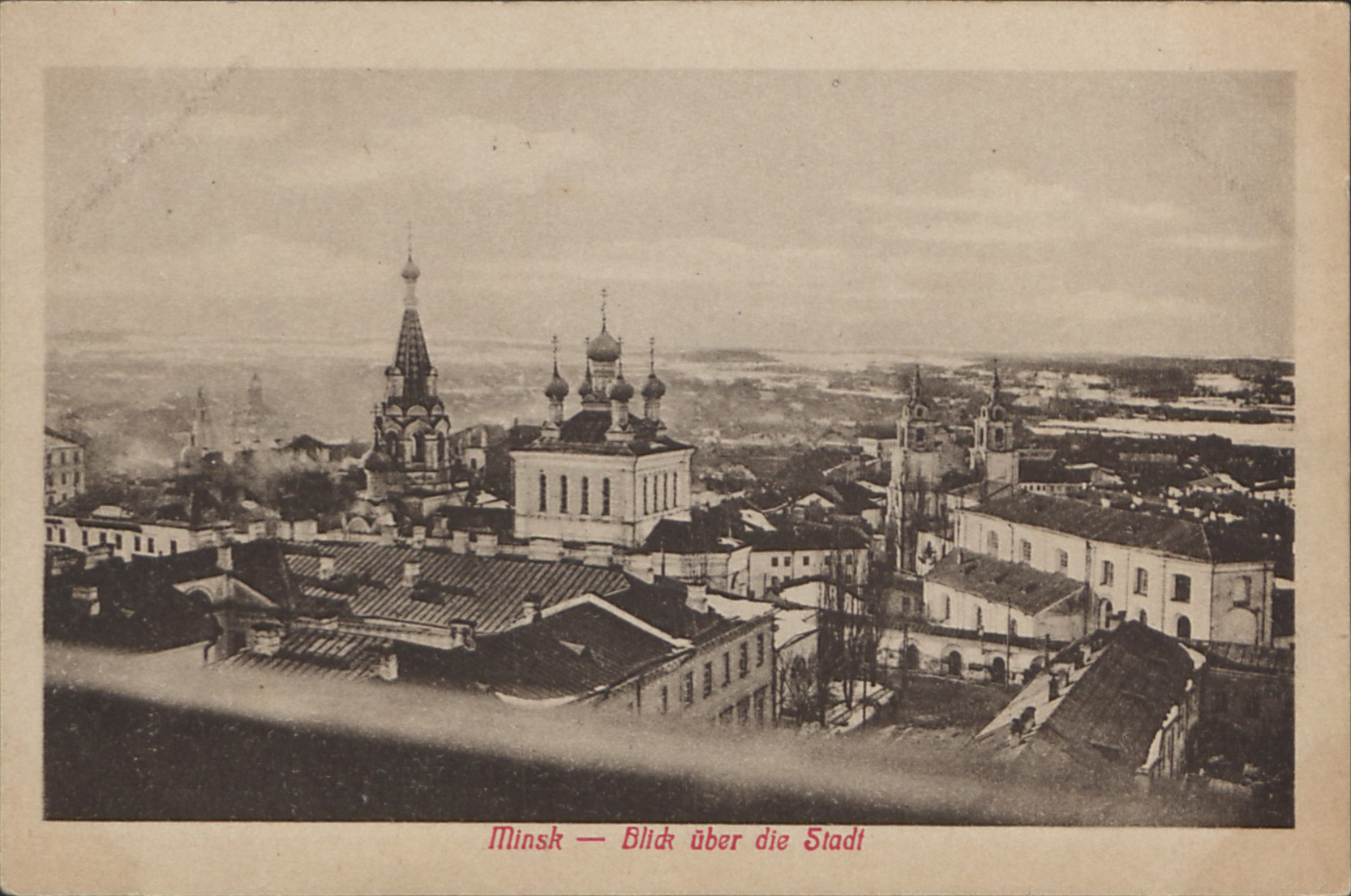
1918 postcard

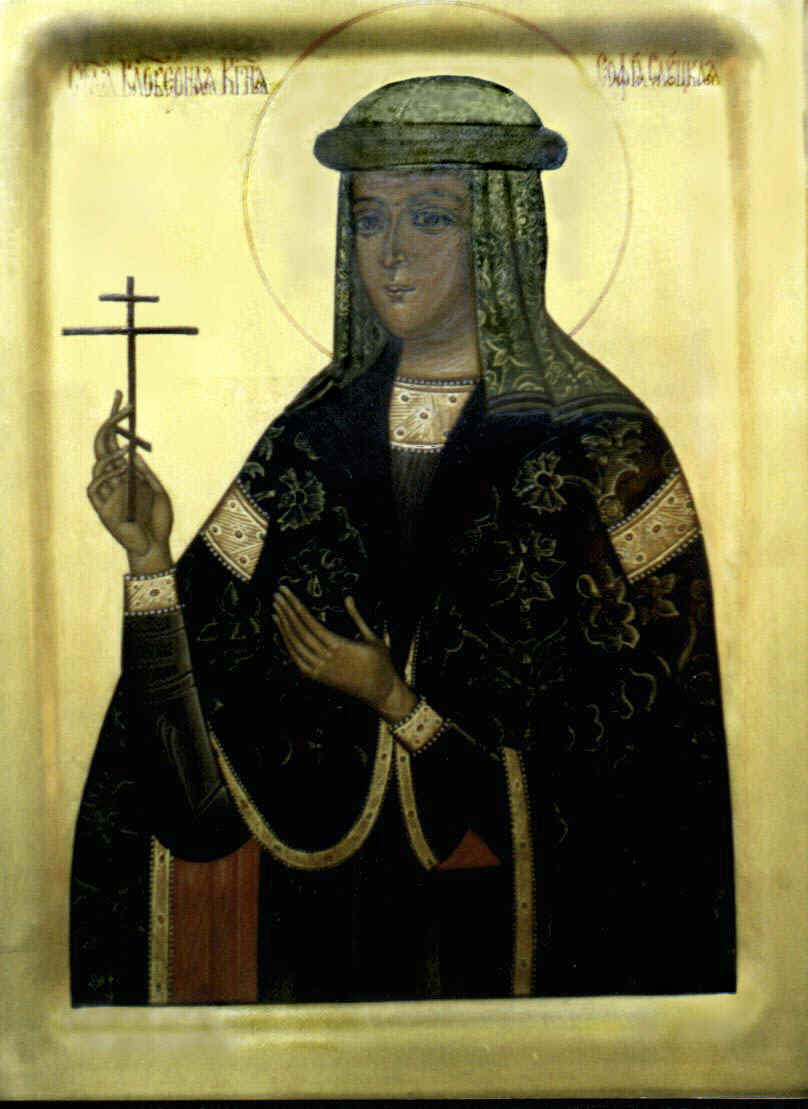
Icon of St. Princess Sofia of Slutsk

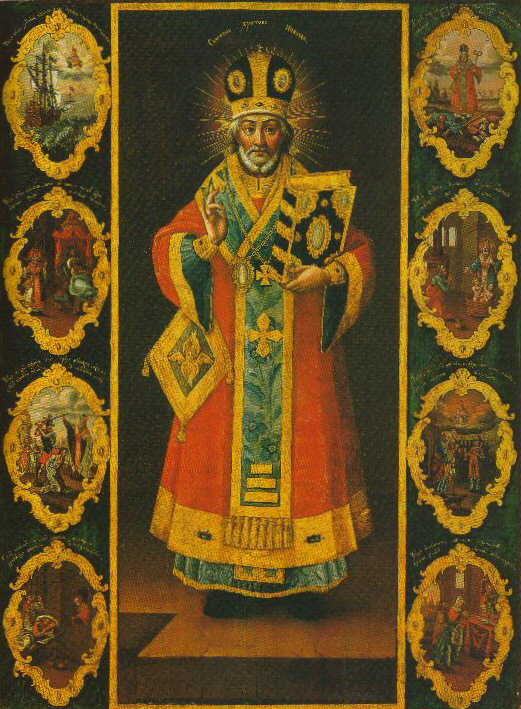
St. Nicholas with scenes from his life, mid-18th century

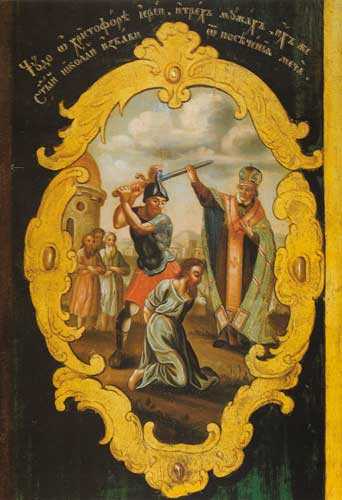
Fresco of St Nicholas

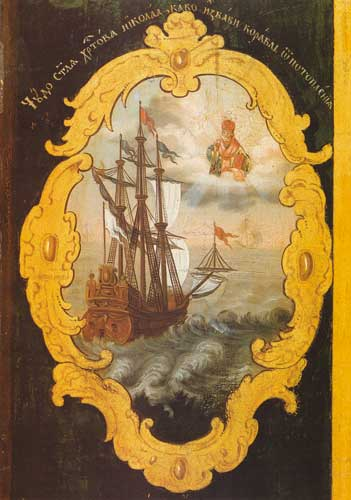
Fresco of St Nicholas

== Sources ==
- Roberts, Nigel (2018). Belarus. Bradt Travel Guides. p. 181. ISBN 9781784776022.
- Kulagin, A. M. (2007). Праваслаўныя храмы Беларусі: энцыклапедычны даведнік [Encyclopedia of Orthodox Churches of Belarus]. Minks: Беларуская Энцыклапедыя. ISBN 978-985-11-0389-4.
