= Bishops' Council of the Russian Orthodox Church =

The Bishops' Council of the Russian Orthodox Church (Russian: Архиерейский собор Русской Православной Церкви) is a local Council, which involves only the bishops, is a formal gathering or council of bishops together with other clerical and lay delegates representing the church to deal with matters of faith, morality, rite, and canonical and cultural life. The supreme body of the hierarchical control of the Russian Orthodox Church, as well as the highest authority in the management of the Ukrainian Orthodox Church (Moscow Patriarchate).

== Functions ==
The modern term appeared in the "Regulations of the Russian Orthodox Church", adopted by the Local Council in 1945. During the course of the "Regulations" going only once: July 18, 1961, and even then without prior notice to make anticanonical amendments to the "Regulations", the conclusions of the members of the clergy church community. As the Council of Bishops was finalized in the Charter, adopted by the 1988 meeting of the Local Council on 8 June 1988. According to the Russian Orthodox Church charter adopted in 2000 the Council of Bishops: "The Council of Bishops is the supreme authority of the hierarchical control of the Russian Orthodox Church and a member of the diocesan bishops, as well as suffragan bishops, the heads of the Synodal institutions and Spiritual Academy or having the canonical jurisdiction over its subordinate parishes. Other vicar bishops may participate in meetings of the Council of Bishops, without the right to vote."

"The Council of Bishops meets the Patriarch of Moscow and All the Rus' (Locum Tenens) and the Holy Synod of the Russian Orthodox Church at least once every four years and in anticipation of the Local Council, and in exceptional cases provided for, in particular, paragraph 20 of section V of this Constitution"

== History ==
In contrast to the Local Council of the Russian Orthodox Church, the Council of Bishops convened regularly since 1990, when the Patriarch of Moscow and All Russia, was elected Metropolitan of Leningrad Alexis (Ridiger)

=== Past meetings ===
- 8 September 1943 (Patriarch Sergius was elected at the Council)
- 21–23 November 1944 (before the Local Council of 1945, at which Patriarch Alexy I was elected)
- 18 July 1961
- 9–11 October 1989
- 30–31 January 1990
- 6 June 1990 (before the Local Council of 1990, at which Patriarch Alexy II was elected)
- 25–27 October 1990
- 31 March – 5 April 1992
- 11 June 1992
- 29 November – 2 December 1994
- 18–23 February 1997
- 13–16 August 2000
- 3–8 October 2004
- 24–29 June 2008
- 25–26 January 2009 (before the Local Council of 2009, which elected Patriarch Kirill)
- 2–4 February 2011
- 2–5 February 2013 – Patriarch Kirill suggests that he is ready to dramatically expand missionary work inside Russia and that the church will first seek to proselytize to peoples of the Far North.
- 2-3 February 2016
- 29 November – 2 December 2017
