= Paul Ponomaryov =

Metropolitan of Krutitsy and Kolomna

Pavel
- Metropolitan of Krutitsy and Kolomna
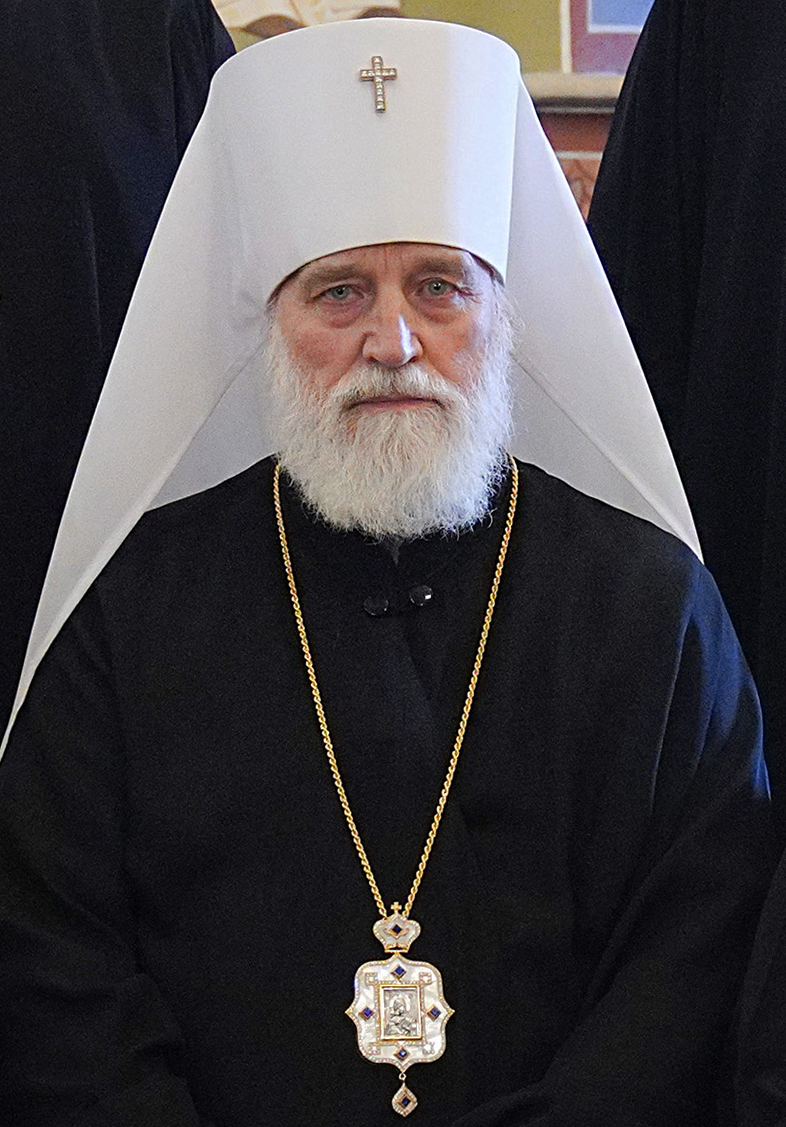
- Metropolitan Paul in 2022
- Church: Russian Orthodox Church
- See: Metropolitan of Krutitsy and Kolomna
- Installed: 15 April 2021
- Predecessor: Juvenal (Poyarkov)

Personal details
- Born: Georgiy Vasilevich Ponomaryov; 19 February 1951 (age 75) Karaganda, Kazakh SSR, Soviet Union

Metropolitan Paul (Russian: Митрополит Павел, Belarusian: Мітрапаліт Павел, secular name Georgiy Vasilevich Ponomaryov, Russian: Георгий Васильевич Пономарёв; (Note: In this name that follows East Slavic naming customs, the patronymic is Vasilevich and the family name is Ponomaryov.) born 19 February 1951) is a bishop of the Russian Orthodox Church and the Metropolitan of Krutitsy and Kolomna, Patriarchal Vicar of the Moscow Metropolitanate, and Permanent Member of the Holy Synod since 15 April 2021.

== Biography ==
Metropolitan Paul was born on 19 February 1952 in Karaganda.

In 1973–1976, he attended the Moscow Theological Seminary. In 1980 he graduated from the Moscow Theological Academy with a degree in theology.

On 19 February 1992 by the decision of the Holy Synod of the Russian Orthodox Church he was appointed Bishop of Zaraisk and was put in charge of the patriarchal parishes in the United States and in Canada.

29 December 1999 he was appointed Bishop of Vienna and Austria. Since 2000 he was also ruler of the Diocese of Budapest and Hungary.

23 February 2001 he was elevated to the rank of Archbishop.

7 May 2003 he was appointed Archbishop of Ryazan and Kasimov.

He became Exarch in December 2013 after the former Exarch, Philaret (Vakhromeyev), stepped down. Metropolitan Paul was assigned to the Krasnodar and Kuban Diocese of the Russian Orthodox Church effective August 26, 2020.
