= Philaret Vakhromeyev =

Exarch of the Belarusian Orthodox Church (1935–2021)

Philaret
- Exarch of the Belarusian Orthodox Church
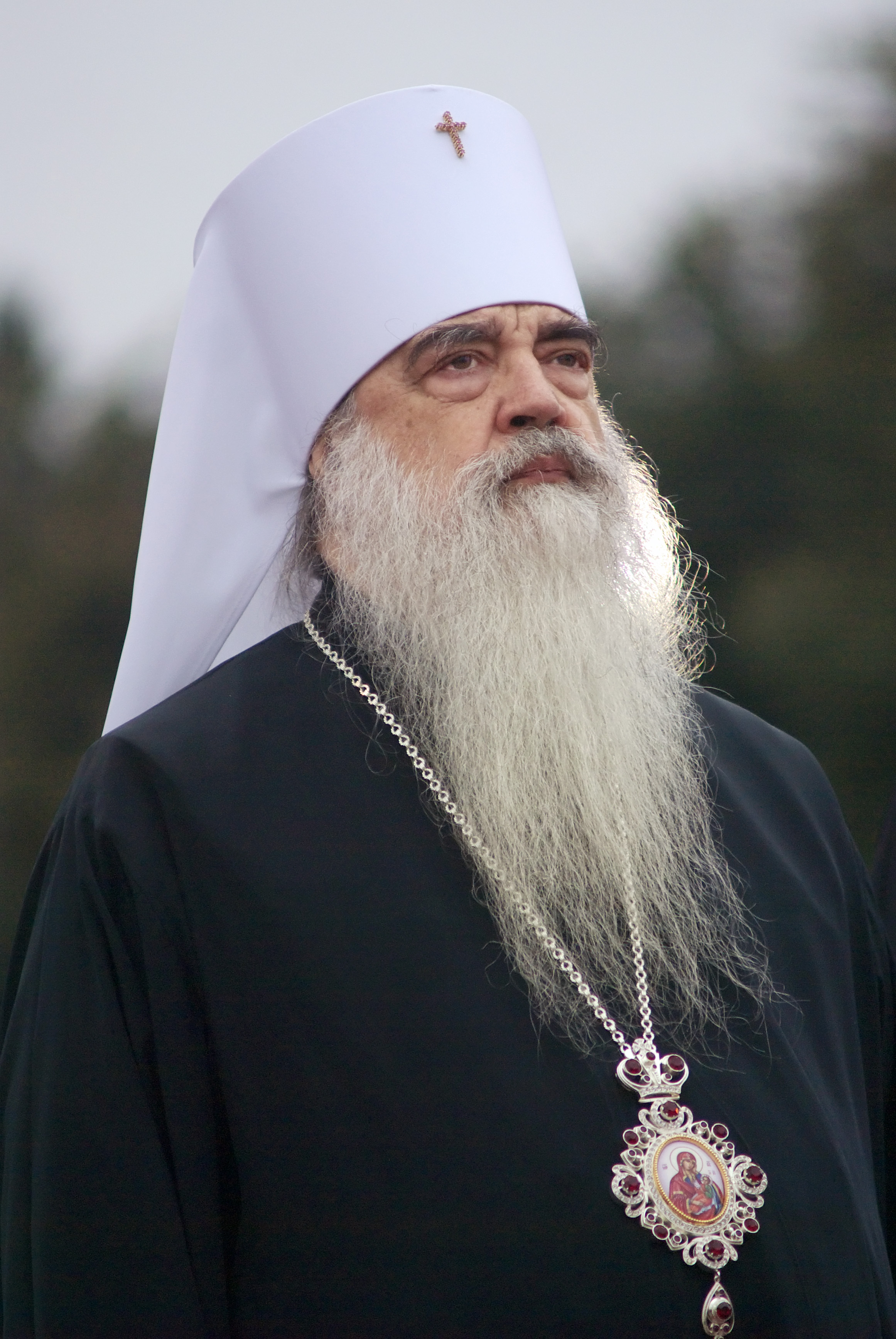
- Church: Russian Orthodox Church
- See: Belarus; Minsk
- Installed: 6 September 2020
- Predecessor: Anthony (Melnikov)
- Successor: Paul Ponomaryov

Personal details
- Born: Kirill Varfolemeyevich Vakhromeyev; 21 March 1935 (age 91) Moscow, Russian SFSR, Soviet Union (now Russia)
- Died: 12 January 2021 (aged 85) Minsk, Belarus

Metropolitan Philaret (Russian: Филарет; Belarusian: Філарэт; 21 March 1935 – 12 January 2021), born Kirill Varfolomeyevich Vakhromeyev (Russian: Кирилл Варфоломеевич Вахромеев) was the emeritus Metropolitan of Minsk and Slutsk, the Patriarchal Exarch of All Belarus and the leader of the Belarusian Orthodox Church that is an autonomous part of the Russian Orthodox Church. He resigned on 25 December 2013, and was succeeded by Paul (Ponomaryov).

== Biography ==
Born in 1935 in Moscow, Kirill attended the Moscow Theological Academy in 1954 after spending a year in the seminary. During the course of his studies, he chose the name Filaret when he received the monastic tonsure in 1959. Two years later, he graduated from the academy with a doctorate in theology. After serving in Minsk, Kaliningrad and Moscow, Filaret was appointed Metropolitan of Minsk and the entire Byelorussian Soviet Socialist Republic in 1978.

In 1989, as the collapse of the Soviet Union was imminent, Filaret was appointed to become the patriarchal exarch of the new country of Belarus. He also served a short term in the Supreme Soviet of the Byelorussian Soviet Socialist Republic.

In 2006, for his work in the Russian Orthodox Church he was awarded the title Hero of Belarus by President Alexander Lukashenko.

The KGB recruited Filaret as an agent some time before 1969, assigning him the code name Ostrovsky.

He died on 12 January 2021, after being hospitalized with COVID-19 during the COVID-19 pandemic in Belarus. Cardinal Kurt Koch of the Catholic Church sent a letter of condolence to Patriarchal Exarch Vienijamin. Koch said that Philaret had made a significant imprint on the church of Belarus, such as "the rebirth of ecclesial life, ... the renewal and construction of new churches and monasteries, and ... the development of religious instruction and educational programs". Catholic Archbishop Emeritus of Minsk, Tadevuš Kandrusievič, pledged to celebrate a Mass in honor of Philaret.

On 3 May 2022, a monument to Metropolitan Filaret was unveiled near the Holy Spirit Cathedral in Minsk. Attending the ceremony was Belarusian President Alexander Lukashenko.
