= Local Council of the Russian Orthodox Church =

Assembly of bishops and other clergy and laity

Local Council of the Russian Orthodox Church (Russian: Поместный собор Русской Православной Церкви) is an assembly of bishops and other clergy and laity, and sometimes, the local church, or surrounding areas for discussion and resolution of issues and affairs, doctrine, religious and moral life, device management, and discipline.

== History ==
Before the 20th century, the term "local council" was used extensively in the Russian historical literature to refer to private (non-ecumenical) councils of antiquity. Although the term was used in the 19th century, and also to refer to the local councils of the Russian Church, and even in the phrase "all-Russian Local Council", the widespread use of the term in the modern sense began in the 20th century in preparation for the All-Russian Council of the Orthodox Russian Church, which opened in August 1917. Most of the council were laymen. Later regulations of the Russian Orthodox Church understand the local council as a collection of bishops and other representatives of the clergy, religious and laity of the local Russian Orthodox Church.
