= 15th–16th century Moscow–Constantinople schism =

Split between the Churches of Moscow and Constantinople

- Date: c. 1467–1560
- Cause: Decision of the Ecumenical Patriarchate (July 1439) to enter in union with the Catholic Church at the Council of Florence; Fall of Constantinople
- Participants: Ecumenical Patriarchate of Constantinople; Russian Orthodox Church
- Outcome: Grand Prince Ivan III of Russia refused to recognize Gregory the Bulgarian as head of Moscow's Church, which led to a rupture of communion between the Churches of Moscow and Constantinople in 1460. This break was mended by around 1560.

The schism between the Ecumenical Patriarchate of Constantinople and the Russian Orthodox Church occurred between approximately 1467 and 1560. (Note: V. M. Lurie in his work called this period the "schism of the Church of Moscow of 1467–1560") This schism de facto ended supposedly around 1560.

On 15 December 1448, Jonah became the metropolitan of Kiev and all Rus' within the Russian Orthodox Church without the agreement of the Ecumenical Patriarchate of Constantinople, which made the Russian Orthodox Church de facto independent. In response, in 1458, Gregory the Bulgarian was appointed and consecrated by the Pope of Rome as the Byzantine Catholic metropolitan of Kiev. Metropolitan Gregory was then recognised by Patriarch Dionysius I of Constantinople in 1466; since Constantinople maintained the Union with the Catholic Church until 1484, Kiev returned under Constantinople's jurisdiction. Dionysius therefore demanded in 1467 that all the hierarchs of the Muscovy submit to Gregory, but Moscow peremptorily refused. On the same year, Grand Prince Ivan III of Moscow declared a complete rupture of relations with the Patriarchate of Constantinople.

Relations were gradually restored and in 1560, the Patriarch of Constantinople considered the metropolitan of Moscow to be his exarch. From 1589 to 1591, the Russian Orthodox Church was recognized as autocephalous, and the patriarch of Moscow later became the eighth patriarch of the Eastern Orthodox Church.

== Background ==
=== Metropolis of Kiev and all Rus' ===
The Metropolis of Kiev and all Rus' was a metropolis of the Eastern Orthodox Church that was erected on the territory of Kievan Rus'. It existed between 988 AD and 1596 AD. Canonically, it was under the jurisdiction of the Ecumenical Patriarchate of Constantinople. The episcopal seat (cathedra) was located in the city of Kiev.

=== Ecumenical council ===
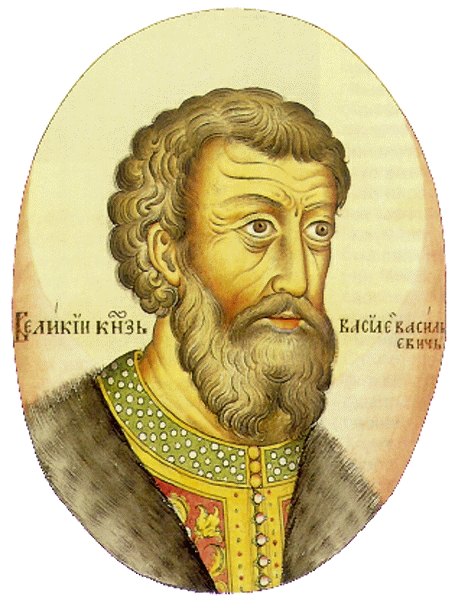
Grand Prince Vasily II

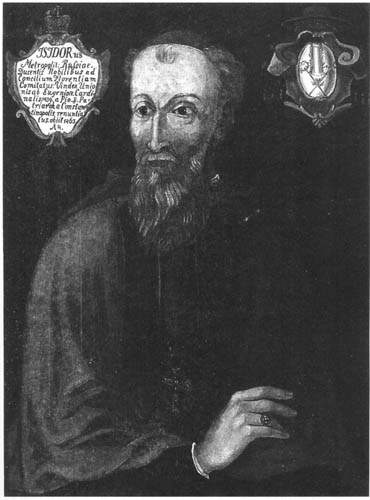
Isidore of Kiev

An ecumenical council of the Catholic Church—the Council of Florence—took place from 1431 to 1449. Although he resisted at first, the Grand Prince of Moscow—Vasily II of Moscow—eventually permitted the Metropolitan of Kiev and all Rus'—Isidore of Kiev—to attend the council on condition that Isidore should return with "the rights of Divine law and the constitution of the holy Church" uninjured. The council healed the Great Schism by uniting the Roman Catholic and Eastern Orthodox churches. The union was proclaimed on 6 July 1439 in the document Laetentur Caeli (Note: Sometimes also spelled as Laetentur Coeli, Laetantur Caeli, Lætentur Cæli, Lætentur Cœli, or Lætantur Cæli, and occasionally referred to as the Act of Union or "Decree of Union".) which was composed by Pope Eugene IV and signed by the Holy Roman Emperor Sigismund and all but one of the bishops present. Some Greek bishops, perhaps feeling political pressure from the Byzantine Emperor, reluctantly accepted the decrees of the council. Other Eastern bishops, such as Isidore, did so with sincere conviction. Sylvester Syropoulos and other Greek writers charge Isidore with perjury because he accepted the union, despite his promise to Vasili II.

Following the signing of the bull, Isidore returned to the Grand Duchy of Moscow. In the Kremlin's Dormition Cathedral, Isidore read the decree of unification aloud. He also passed a message to Vasili II from the Holy See, containing a request to assist the metropolitan in spreading the Union in Rus'. Three days later, Isidore was arrested by the Grand Prince and imprisoned in the Chudov Monastery. He arranged for certain Rus' clergy to denounce the metropolitan for refusing to renounce the union with Rome. As a result, the Great Prince of Moscow voided the union in his lands and imprisoned Isidore for some time. Having adjudged Isidore to have apostatized to Catholicism, he was deposed by a local synod.

== Premises of the schism ==
The Council of Bishops of Moscow condemned Isidor and imprisoned him. They later sent a letter to the Patriarch of Constantinople in which they listed Isidore's faults and requested that his case be considered. They also asked to be allowed to ordain a Metropolitan of Kiev and all Rus' by themselves; apparently, they had no doubt that Isidore would be deprived of his dignity. This letter has been interpreted in two ways. According to the historian Golubinsky, Moscow offered Constantinople a kind of compromise: Moscow gets the opportunity to ordain a Metropolitan and in return it does not raise the issue of the Union, while remaining in formal dependence on the uniate Patriarch of Constantinople. According to the historian Florya, the Eastern Orthodox of Moscow were sure of the imminent failure of the Union supporters, and were hoping for this failure.

However, the situation was different, and the new Patriarch of Constantinople was the uniate Metrophanes II, who continued to follow the decisions of the Council of Florence. The Eastern Orthodox of Moscow did not dare to judge Isidore themselves, so he was expelled from Moscow (it was officially announced that he had escaped); then, he was also expelled from Tver. He was also poorly met in Lithuanian Navahrudak, because Lithuanian Prince Casimir recognized the anti-pope Felix V who had been previously elected by the Council of Basel. In March 1443, Isidore had moved in Buda, possession of the new king of Poland and Hungary Vladislav III, and contributed to the publication of the privilege, which formally equated the rights of Catholic and Eastern Orthodox clergy in kings' lands. Then he went to Rome. It is known that at least one of the Eastern Orthodox bishops of the Grand Duchy of Lithuania accepted the ordination from Isidor, and repented of it, but other information on the situation in Lithuania is extremely rare.

=== Question of the subordination of the Metropolis of Kiev and all Rus' and the union ===
After the exile of Isidore from Moscow in 1441, the question of the subordination of the Metropolitan of Kiev and all Rus' to the Church of Constantinople remained unclear for a long time. In Constantinople itself, there was a fierce struggle between pro- and anti-unionists. In fact, the Union was supported by a narrow group of elite from the capital of the dying Empire. Russian Grand Prince Vasiliy II supported the anti-unionists (those information are preserved his correspondence with the monks of Mount Athos). After the death of the pro-unionist Metrophanes II in 1443, in Constantinople for a long time they did not manage to elect a new Patriarch. In 1444–1445 there were 15 public disputes between supporters and opponents of the Union.

Gradually, the ranks of the pro-unionists were reduced and ten years after the Council of Florence, only four of the members of the Greek delegation remained faithful to the Union. Despite this, the firm supporter of the Union Gregory Mammas became the new Patriarch (in 1444 or 1445). His position remained fragile and he fled Constantinople in 1451 after the death of Byzantine emperor John VIII Palaiologos (one of the initiators of the Union). Information about relations between Moscow and Constantinople during this period is extremely scarce and unreliable.

=== Election of Metropolitan Jonah of Kiev and all Rus' ===
After Vasily II regained his throne in 1447, Jonah was still officially only the bishop of Ryazan and his name was only in third place. (Note: "In the accusing charter of the Russian clergy against Shemyaka, sent in December 6956 (1447) Jonah is still referred to as "the bishop of Ryazan" and is named on the third place – after Efrem of Rostov and Abraham of Suzdal") It is only in 1448 that the Council of bishops of North-Eastern Rus' proclaimed Jonas Metropolitan of Kiev and All Rus'. This decision was not unanimous—the bishops of Tver and Novgorod (both cities were semi-independent from Moscow) did not sign the Charter of his election.

In support of Jonah's claims, Moscow claimed that the previous Metropolitan of Kiev and All Rus', Photios, had proclaimed Jonah as his successor, and that a Patriarch of Constantinople which they did not name had once promised Jonah that he would become Metropolitan of Kiev and All Rus' after Isidore. Some modern researchers doubt the validity of these claims.

The election of Jonah was not accompanied by a clear break with Constantinople. For example, Vasily II composed a letter to the new Emperor Constantine XI Palaiologos (whom he wrongly considered an opponent of the Union). Vasily justified the unauthorized election of Jonah by extreme circumstances and asked for communion and blessings, but only if there would be an Eastern Orthodox Patriarch in Constantinople:

We have done this from necessity, not from pride or insolence. Till the end of time we shall abide in the Orthodoxy that was given to us; our Church will always seek the blessing of the Church of Tsarigrad (Note: Constantinople, literally "The City of Tsars" which mean "The City of Emperors") and will be obedient in all things to the ancient piety.

However Constantine XI, in a desperate search for allies against the Turks, agreed to the Union. Soon, in 1453, Constantinople fell and the question of recognizing Jonah remained uncertain until his death.

The Ecumenical Patriarchate wrote in an official letter in 2018: "the Holy Metropolitanate of Kiev has always belonged to the jurisdiction of the Mother Church of Constantinople, founded by it as a separate Metropolitanate, occupying the 60th position in the list of the eparchies of the Ecumenical Throne. Later on, the local Synod in the state of Great Russia—upon an unfounded pretext—unilaterally cut itself off from its canonical authority, i.e. the Holy Great Church of Christ (1448), but in the city of Kiev other Metropolitans, authentic and canonical, were continually and unceasingly ordained by the Ecumenical Patriarchate, since the Kievan clergy and laity did not accept their subjection to the center of Moscovy."

== Schism ==
=== Gregory the Bulgarian, division of the Metropolis of Kiev, and beginning of the schism ===
After his election, Metropolitan Jonah tried to assert his jurisdiction over the Eastern Orthodox of Lithuania. He succeeded because the Grand Duke of Lithuania Casimir, who was recently (in 1447) elected king of Poland, and Vasily II (his brother-in-law) were able to agree on this. In 1451, Casimir IV sent a charter to the Eastern Orthodox of Lithuania in which he called them to obey Jonah as Metropolitan.

In 1454, after they conquered Constantinople, the Ottomans removed Ecumenical Patriarch Athanasius II and imposed a new Ecumenical Patriarch, Gennadios, "who promptly renounced the Filioque."

However, in 1458 the Patriarch-Uniate Gregory Mammas, who had fled from Constantinople to Rome, ordained Gregory the Bulgarian as new Metropolitan of Kiev and All Rus'. Previously, also in 1458, Pope Calixtus III had divided the Metropolis of Kiev into two parts: "Superior Russia" centered about Moscow and "Inner Russia" centered about Kiev.

Casimir IV was forced to cede to the demands of Pope Calixtus III and to recognize Gregory as Metropolitan, restoring the Union in Lithuania. Jonah resisted this decision, and in 1459 he assembled the Council and demanded that its members swear allegiance to him or to his successor, as well as to sever relations with the Uniate Metropolitan Gregory. In case of any persecution by the authorities, Jonah promised the bishops refuge in the Moscow Principality, but only one Bishop, Evfimy of Bryansk and Chernigov, took advantage of this offer (he became Bishop of Suzdal). In 1461, Jonah died. Despite the victory of Gregory the Bulgarian over the Eastern Orthodox bishops, he faced resistance to the Union at the grassroots level (at this time the first Orthodox "brotherhoods" were formed).

At the same time, in Constantinople, which was ruled by the Turks, the Union was finally rejected. As a result, Gregory decided to leave the Catholic Church, and returned to the jurisdiction of Patriarch Dionysius I of Constantinople. In February 1467 Dionysius sent a letter to Moscow, in which he called all the Russian lands, and especially Great Novgorod, to accept Gregory as the only legitimate Metropolitan recognized by Constantinople. In addition, in the same letter Dionysius claimed that his Holy Catholic Church "did not accept, does not hold, and does not name as metropolitans" Jonah and other metropolitans, ordained in Moscow after him. At this time, Philip I was the metropolitan in Moscow, since 1464; he replaced Theodosius, whom Jonah had appointed as his successor.

=== Complete rupture with the Ecumenical Patriarch by Ivan III ===
Grand Prince Ivan III of Russia refused to recognize Gregory the Bulgarian, which led to a rupture of relations between Moscow and Constantinople. In 1470, Ivan III wrote to the Archbishop of Novgorod that he did not recognize Gregory as a Metropolitan; Ivan added concerning the Patriarch of Constantinople: "we do not demand him, nor his blessing, nor his disregard, we consider him, the very patriarch, alien and renounced". These words were a clear confirmation of the formal break with Constantinople, which arose because of the autocephaly of the church of Moscow. Soon the Novgorod Republic tried to get out from the influence of Moscow, recognizing Casimir of Poland and Lithuania as their liege, and Gregory as their Metropolitan. But Ivan III suppressed this attempt by military force, executing leaders of the opposition (1471).

=== Consequences of the fall of Constantinople ===
==== Role of the Byzantine emperor in the Eastern Orthodox Church ====
- The Byzantine Empire was a theocracy, the Emperor was the supreme authority in both church and state. "The king is not God among men but the Viceroy of God. He is not the logos incarnate but is in a special relation with the logos. He has been specially appointed and is continually inspired by God, the friend of God, the interpreter of the Word of God. His eyes look upward, to receive the messages of God. He must be surrounded with the reverence and glory that befits God's earthly copy; and he will 'frame his earthly government according to the pattern of the divine original, finding strength in its conformity with the monarchy of God'."
- In the East, endorsement of Caesaropapism, subordination of the church to the religious claims of the dominant political order, was most fully evident in the Byzantine Empire at the end of the first millennium, while in the West the decline of imperial authority left the Church relatively independent.

In Eastern Orthodox Christianity, the role of the Roman emperor as the sole secular head of all Eastern Orthodox was very prominent. Thus, in 1393 Patriarch Anthony IV of Constantinople wrote to Grand Prince Vasily I of Moscow:

The holy emperor has a great place in the church, for he is not like other rulers or governors of other regions. This s [sic] so because from the beginning the emperors established and confirmed the [true] faith in all the inhabited world. They convoked the ecumenical councils and confirmed and decreed the acceptance of the pronouncements of the divine and holy canons regarding the correct doctrines and the government of Christians. [...] The basileus [note: the Greek term for emperor] is anointed with the great myrrh and is appointed basileus and autokrator of the Romans, and indeed of all Christians. Everywhere the name of the emperor is commemorated by all patriarchs and metropolitans and bishops wherever men are called Christians, [a thing] which no other ruler or governor ever received. Indeed he enjoys such great authority over all that even the Latins themselves, who are not in communion with our church, render him the same honor and submission which they did in the old days when they were united with us. So much more do Orthodox Christians owe such recognition to him....
Therefore, my son, you are wrong to affirm that we have the church without an Emperors for it is impossible for Christians to have a church and no empire. The Baslleia [empire] and the church have a great unity and community—indeed they cannot be separated. Christians can repudiate only emperors who are heretics who attack the church, or who introduce doctrines irreconcilable with the teachings of the Apostles and the Fathers. [...] Of whom, then, do the Fathers, councils, and canons speak? Always and everywhere they speak loudly of' the one rightful basileus, whose laws, decrees, and charters are in force throughout the world and who alone, only he, is mentioned in all places by Christians in the liturgy.

— Letter of Patriarch Anthony to Vasily I

The basileus gave the Patriarchate of Constantinople an enormous prestige, although this position of Eastern Orthodox emperor was challenged; indeed, the rivalry for primacy with the basileus of the Byzantine empire was especially strong among the Eastern Orthodox Slavs in the Balkans, who sought autocephaly for their churches and gave their rulers the title of tsar (emperor). (Note: For example, the tsar of Bulgaria or the emperor of the Serbs.) The capital of the Bulgarian Tsardome, Tarnovo, was even called "New Rome". The Patriarchs of Constantinople, however, did not recognize these rulers as equal to a basileus of the Byzantine Empire. Muscovy also shared this feeling of rivalry with the Byzantine empire over the secular primacy in the Eastern Orthodox Church.

==== Moscow, third Rome ====
The expulsion of Metropolitan Isidore and the independent ordination of Jonah were the response of Moscow to the Union. However, even after the Patriarchate of Constantinople officially rejected the Union in 1484, its jurisdiction over Moscow was not restored because there was no Eastern Roman emperor anymore.

In 1453, Constantinople was captured by the Turks, and the last fragment of the Byzantine Empire, Trebizond, fell in 1461 to the Turks. Even before the fall of Constantinople, the Orthodox Slavic states in the Balkans had fallen under Turkish rule. The fall of Constantinople caused tremendous fears, many considered the fall of Constantinople as a sign the End time was near (in 1492 it was 7000 Anno Mundi); others believed that the emperors of the Holy Roman Empire (although he was a Roman Catholic) now took the place of the emperors of Constantinople. There were also hopes that Constantinople would be liberated soon. Moreover, the Orthodox Church was left without its Eastern Orthodox Basileus. Therefore, the question arose of who would become the new basileus. At the end of the various "Tales" about the fall of Constantinople, which gained great popularity in Moscow Russia, it was directly stated that the Rus' people would defeat the Ishmaelites (Muslims) and their king would become the basileus in the City of Seven Hills (Constantinople). The Grand Prince of Moscow remained the strongest of the Eastern Orthodox rulers; Ivan III married Sophia Paleologue, broke his formal subordination to the Golden Horde (already divided into several Tatar kingdoms) and became an independent ruler. All of this strengthened Moscow's claims to primacy in the Eastern Orthodox world. However, the liberation of Constantinople was still far away—the Moscow State had no opportunity to fight the Ottoman Empire. At the end of the 15th century, the emergence of the idea that Moscow is a truly a new Rome can be found. Metropolitan Zosima, in 1492, quite clearly expressed it, calling Ivan III "the new Tsar Constantine of the new city of Constantine—Moscow." This idea is best known in the presentation of the monk Philotheus of the early 16th century:

So know, pious king, that all the Christian kingdoms came to an end and came together in a single kingdom of yours, two Romes have fallen, the third stands, and there will be no fourth [emphasis added]. No one shall replace your Christian Tsardom according to the great Theologian [cf. Revelation 17:10] [...].

The Moscow scholars explained the fall of Constantinople as the divine punishment for the sin of the Union with the Catholic Church, but they did not want to obey the Patriarch of Constantinople, although there were no unionist patriarchs since the Turkish conquest in 1453 and the first Patriarch since then, Gennadius Scholarius, was the leader of the anti-unionists. At the next synod, held in Constantinople in 1484, the Union was finally declared invalid. Having lost its Christian basileus after the Turkish conquest, Constantinople as a center of power lost a significant part of its authority. On the contrary, the Moscow rulers soon began to consider themselves real Tsars (this title was already used by Ivan III), and therefore according to them the center of the Eastern Orthodox Church should have been located in Moscow, and thus the bishop of Moscow should become the head of the Orthodoxy. The text of the bishop's oath in Muscovy, edited in 1505–1511, condemned the ordination of metropolitans in Constantinople, calling it "the ordination in the area of godless Turks, by the pagan (Note: The term "pagan" has been used to refer to any adherent of a different faith and had a very negative connotation. In this case, it is used to designate pejoratively the muslims.) tsar."

"The liturgical privileges that the Byzantine emperor enjoyed carried over to the Muscovite tsar. In 1547, for instance, when Ivan IV was crowned tsar, not only was he anointed as the Byzantine emperor had been after the late twelfth century, but he was also allowed to communicate in the sanctuary with the clergy."

"The Russian Orthodox Church declared itself autocephalous in 1448, on the basis of explicit rejection of the Filioque, and the doctrine of "Moscow as the Third and Final Rome" was born. This rejection of the Idea of Progress embodied in the Council of Florence is the cultural root of subsequent Russian imperial designs on the West."

=== Attempts to restore relations ===
When breaking off relations with Constantinople in 1467–1470, ambassadors of the Ecumenical Patriarch were forbidden to enter the possession of the Moscow Grand Prince Ivan III. As a result, direct contacts were completely interrupted for almost half a century. However, Moscow continued to intensively communicate with the monks of Mount Athos and in 1517 Patriarch Theoleptus I of Constantinople used this channel of communication. Together with the elders of Athos, among whom was the famous Maximus the Greek, he sent his ambassadors, Gregory (Metropolitan of Zichnai) and the patriarchal deacon, to the Grand Prince Vasily III.

The question of who initiated this contact remains unresolved. It is known that Vasily III was childless for a long time in his first marriage, and many attempts were made to beg for an heir from the Higher powers. The monks of Athos who accompanied the ambassadors reported that they fulfilled the request to pray for the childbearing of Princess Solomonia in the monasteries of the Holy Mountain. Modern researchers (Dm. Kryvtsov, V. Lurie) believe that the initiative came from the Patriarch of Constantinople, and the real goal (in addition to the request for financial assistance) was to restore the canonical jurisdiction of Constantinople over Moscow. The story of this embassy in the Moscow chronicles was seriously reworked, and some documents were withdrawn, but the original evidence is preserved in the materials of the trial of Maximus the Greek. It follows from them that the Patriarch's ambassadors were met extremely coldly; the Grand Prince and Metropolitan Varlaam did not accept the blessing from the Patriarch's envoy.

In the ensuing controversy about the right to autocephaly, Moscow had no serious canonical arguments. However, Muscovites believed that if God was dissatisfied with the ordination of Jonas in 1448, He would somehow have shown it. In particular, afterlife miracles of former Metropolitans of Moscow, saint Alexius and saint Peter—saint Alexius having been canonized by Jonah in 1448 -, were cited to prove that those saints were in favor of the ordination of Metropolitan Jonah. In addition, Muscovites recalled precedents—the proclamation of autocephaly of the Serbian and Bulgarian churches and similar miracles performed by the relics of the Patriarch of Bulgaria. According to the Moscow scholars, those miracles could not have been possible if God did not want the Bulgarians to have their own independent primate. The embassy of the Patriarch of Constantinople was in Moscow for a year and a half, and at this time (1518–1519) sources record a series of miraculous healings from the relics of Metropolitan Alexius (his canonization was the first act of Metropolitan Jonah after his ordination in 1448). In honor of these healings, magnificent celebrations were arranged with the participation of the Grand Duke, Metropolitans, bishops and other members of the clergy, who had to show the "Greeks" the legitimacy of the Moscow autocephaly. The possession of ancient Byzantine icons as a symbol of continuity and preservation of "pure" Orthodox traditions was also demonstrated to the "Greeks". In 1518, Metropolitan of Moscow Varlaam made a public prayer for the ending of prolonged rains. When the rains came to an end, it was also regarded as an approval of the legitimacy of Varlaam's ordination.

The Greeks could not do anything against such arguments. Even if they were not directly expressed, the very atmosphere of the continuous triumph of "Russian Orthodoxy" made useless any attempt to officially raise the question of the subordination of the Moscow autocephalous church to the Patriarch of Constantinople. So the envoys of the Ecumenical Patriarch returned with nothing. The next envoy of the Patriarch of Constantinople appeared in Moscow only 37 years later, in 1556. Maximus the Greek stayed in Moscow and tried to debate, explaining the uncanonical character of the Moscow autocephaly and the fact that the Metropolitan of Moscow was ordinated "not according to divine scripture, nor according to the rules of the Saints Fathers". This ended for him with a trial and a very long imprisonment, despite the sympathetic attitude of a part of the clergy who, to the best of their strength, facilitated his fate and made it possible for him to continue his writings.

In 1539, Grand Prince Vasily III died. As a result of court intrigues, Metropolitan Daniel was dismissed, and Joasaph (Skripitsyn), abbot of the Trinity Lavra of St. Sergius, was put in his place. Joasaph was a famous book lover and patron of scribes and calligraphers; he opposed to Josephites and was a friend of Maximus the Greek. Ascending the post, Joasaph did not renounce the patriarch of Constantinople, as his predecessors Moscow metropolitans did and as his successors would; Joasaph did not declare Moscow's Orthodoxy as being the only true one. Historian Vladimir Lurie believes that the actions of Joasaph can be considered as an attempt to bring Moscow out of the schism. However, Joasaph's rule was short-lived, in 1542 he was removed from the See of Moscow.

== End of the schism and recognition of Moscow's autocephaly ==
The exact time of the end of the schism is not known for sure. The Church historian Anton Kartashev believed that the excommunication imposed by Constantinople for the rejection of Isidore "was never lifted from the Russian Church in formal and documented way. It gradually melted in the course of history, and at the time the Moscow Patriarchate was approved in 1589, it was not even remembered". On the other hand, the modern historian of the Church, Vladimir Lurie, believes that in 1560–1561 the Metropolis of Moscow returned to the jurisdiction of the Patriarch of Constantinople, while losing its self-proclaimed autocephaly. This conclusion was made as a result of a detailed analysis of a set of documents relating to the Embassy of Archimandrite Theodorite of 1557 and the Embassy of Archimandrite Joasaph of 1560–1561. The main issue of negotiations was to confirm the coronation of Ivan the Terrible as a real Eastern Orthodox tsar (emperor). In one letter, the patriarch of Constantinople Joasaph calls the metropolitan of Moscow "the exarch of the catholic patriarch" (Greek: ώς εξαρχος πατριαρχιός καθολικός). Such a title meant administrative subordination, and beyond that it was specially noted in this letter that "he has power from us" (that is, from the Patriarch of Constantinople) and only in this way could he act as a hierarch.

The Russian Orthodox Church considers that it became de facto autocephalous in 1448, yet the other Eastern Orthodox Patriarchs recognized its autocephaly only in 1589–1593. "This was done by means of two letters signed, not by the Ecumenical Patriarch alone, but also by other Patriarchs of the East. In these letters the Patriarchal rank of the primate of the Russian Church was recognized and the Patriarch of Moscow was placed fifth in diptych after the four Patriarchs of the East."

== See also ==
Eastern Orthodoxy

- Bulgarian schism
- 1996 Moscow–Constantinople schism
- 2018 Moscow–Constantinople schism
- Autocephaly of the Orthodox Church of Ukraine
- Phyletism
- Moscow, third Rome

Politics

- Russian irredentism
- Russian nationalism
- Ukrainian nationalism

== Sources ==
- Shubin, Daniel (2004). A History of Russian Christianity. Volume I: From the Earliest Years through Tsar Ivan IV. New York: Algora Publishing. ISBN 978-0-87586-289-7.
- Dezhnyuk, Sergey (2015). Council of Florence: The Unrealized Union. A Project Report Submitted to the Faculty In Partial Fulfillment of the Requirements For the Degree of Masters of Theological Studies. Tulsa, OK: Phillips Theological Seminary.
- Runciman, Steven (1985). The Great Church in Captivity: A Study of the Patriarchate of Constantinople from the Eve of the Turkish Conquest to the Greek War of Independence. Cambridge University Press. ISBN 978-0-521-31310-0. (excerpts here)
- Голубинский Е. Е. История Русской Церкви. Т. II 1-я половина. С. 469—515
- Казакова Н. А. Известия летописей и хронографов о начале автокефалии русской церкви. // Из истории русской культуры. Т.II. кн. 1. С. 415—424.
- Казакова Н. А. Вопрос о причинах осуждения Максима Грека. // Византийский временник, т. 29.
- Синицына Н. В. Автокефалия Русской церкви и учреждение Московского патриархата.//Церковь, общество и государство в феодальной России. С. 156—151.
- Флоря Б. Н.. Флорентийская уния и Восточная Европа (конец 30-х — конец 60-х гг. XV в.)
- В. М., Лурье. Прекращение московского церковного раскола 1467—1560 годов: финал истории в документах (also on Academia.edu) (in Russian)
- Я. С. Лурье Как установилась афтокефалия русской церкви в XV в.? Вспомогательные исторические дисциплины. – Т. XXIII. – Л., 1991. (in Russian)
- Кривцов, Дмитрий (2001). "Посольство константинопольского вселенского патриарха Феолипта I в Москву в 1518 — 1519 гг. (Эпизод из истории борьбы за признание автокефалии русской Церкви)". Материалы докладов научных конференций, проводившихся в Нижегородском государственном университете им. Н.И. Лобачевского 22 мая 1998 г., 21 мая 1999 г. и 21 мая 2000 г. Нижний Новгород: Издательство ННГУ. pp. 45–67. ISBN 5-85746-624-5.
- Абеленцева О.А. Митрополит Иона и установление автокефалии Русской Церкви. — СПб.: Альянс-Архео, 2009. — 472 с (no access yet)
- Jonah in the Orthodox Encyclopedia:
- Gregory the Bulgarian in the Orthodox Encyclopedia:
- Philippides, Marios and Hanak, Walter K., Cardinal Isidore (c.1390–1462): A Late Byzantine Scholar, Warlord, and Prelate, Routledge, 2018 (on Google books)
