= May 27 (Eastern Orthodox liturgics) =

Day in the Eastern Orthodox liturgical calendar

Eastern Orthodox liturgical calendar
May 26	May 27	May 28
May 27 O.S. ≍ June 9 N.S. May 27 N.S ≍ May 14 O.S.

An Eastern Orthodox cross

May 27 in Eastern Orthodox liturgical calendars is a feast day and a day of commemoration of saints and martyrs. Although some Orthodox churches use the Revised Julian Calendar and others use the traditional Julian calendar, the fixed commemorations for their respective May 27 are broadly the same, no matter which calendar is used. (Note: Despite the dates being the same, the days to which they refer typically differ by 13 days. The notation Old Style or O.S. is sometimes used to indicate a date in the traditional Julian Calendar (the "Old Calendar"). The notation New Style or N.S. indicates a date in the Revised Julian calendar (the "New Calendar").)

== Saints ==
- Hieromartyr Therapont of Sardis, Bishop, by beheading (259)
- Martyr Julius the Veteran, at Dorostolum in Moesia (297)
- Virgin-martyr Theodora, and Martyr Didymus the Soldier, of Alexandria (304)
- Martyr Eusebiotus, by fire.
- Martyr Alypius, by stoning.
- Martyr Juliana. (Note: Her feast day is celebrated on March 4. It is unknown why the Synaxaristes has this entry here on May 27.)
- Hieromartyr Helladios, Bishop (6th-7th centuries)
- Saint Michael of Parekhi, Georgia (8th-9th century)
- Saint Basil of Khakhuli, son of King Bagrat III of Georgia (11th century)

== Pre-Schism Western saints ==
- Saint Restituta and Companions (272) (Note: "At Sora, in the time of Emperor Aurelian and the proconsul Agathius, St. Restituta, virgin and martyr, who overcame in a trial for the faith the violence of the demons, the affections of her family, and the cruelty of the executioners. Being finally beheaded with other Christians, she obtained the honour of martyrdom."; "Born in Rome of a noble family, she fled to Sora in Campania in Italy to escape persecution under Aurelian but was martyred there with several companions."; In Iconography she is shown together with her guardian angel.)
- Saint Eutropius of Orange (475) (Note: "Born in Marseilles, he succeeded St Justin as Bishop of Orange in France, when the diocese had been laid waste by the Visigoths.")
- Venerable Melangell of Wales, Abbess (590) (Note: "A holy virgin who lived as an anchoress in Powys in Wales. Her shrine is in Pennant Melangell.")
- Martyr Ranulf (Ragnulf), in Thélus near Arras in France (700) (Note: "He was the father of St. Hadulph, Bishop of Arras-Cambrai.")
- Venerable Bede the Confessor, Hieromonk and Chronicler, of Monkwearmouth–Jarrow Abbey (735)
- Saint Bruno of Würzburg (Bruno of Carinthia), Bishop of Würzburg (1045)

== Post-Schism Orthodox saints ==
- Venerable Therapont of White Lake, Abbot of Byelozersk (White Lake) and Mozhaisk (1426)
- Saint Philip I, Metropolitan of Moscow (1473)
- New Hieromartyr Therapontus, Priest, of Sofia, Bulgaria (1555)
- Venerable Therapont of Monza, Abbot of Monza (1597) (Note: His feast day is celebrated on December 12. On this day is celebrated the holy ascetic's name-in-common with Saint Therapont of Sardis and Therapont of White Lake.)
- Saint John the Russian the Confessor, whose relics are on the island of Euboea (1730) (Note: A Kozak, St John was taken captive and sold into slavery by the Tatars into a Turkish family. His holiness and miracles inspired that same family to build his church-shrine after his repose. He is very popular in Greece.)
- Venerable Hiero-schema-monk Lazarus the Clarivoyant, of Pskov-Caves Monastery (1824)

== Other commemorations ==
- Translation of the relics (1472) of Sts. Cyprian (1406), Photius (1431), and Jonah (1461), Metropolitans of Kiev.
- Translation of the relics (1667) of Venerable Nilus of Stolobny Island (1554)
- Repose of Blessed Zina of Vetluga (1960)
- Viliya Icon of the Most Holy Theotokos.

== Icon gallery ==
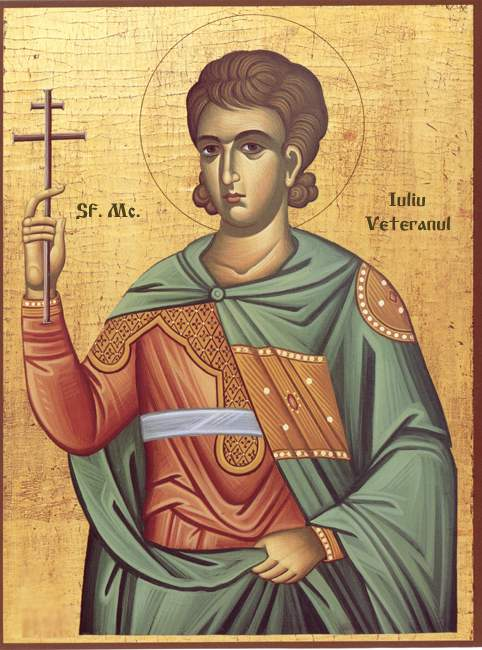
St. Julius the Veteran.

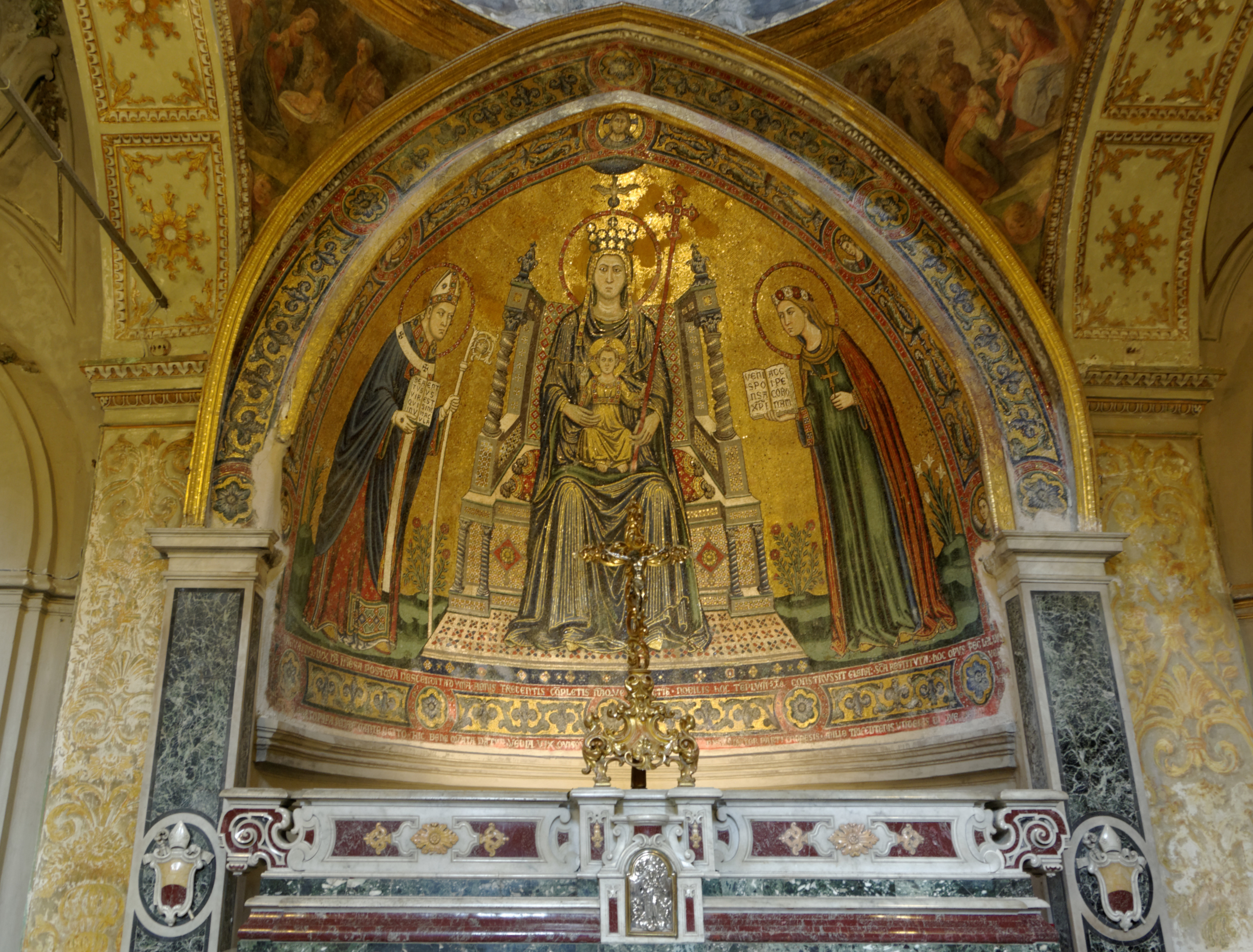
Mosaic of the Theotokos and Christ child, between St. and St. Restituta (Naples Cathedral - Chapel of St. Restituta).

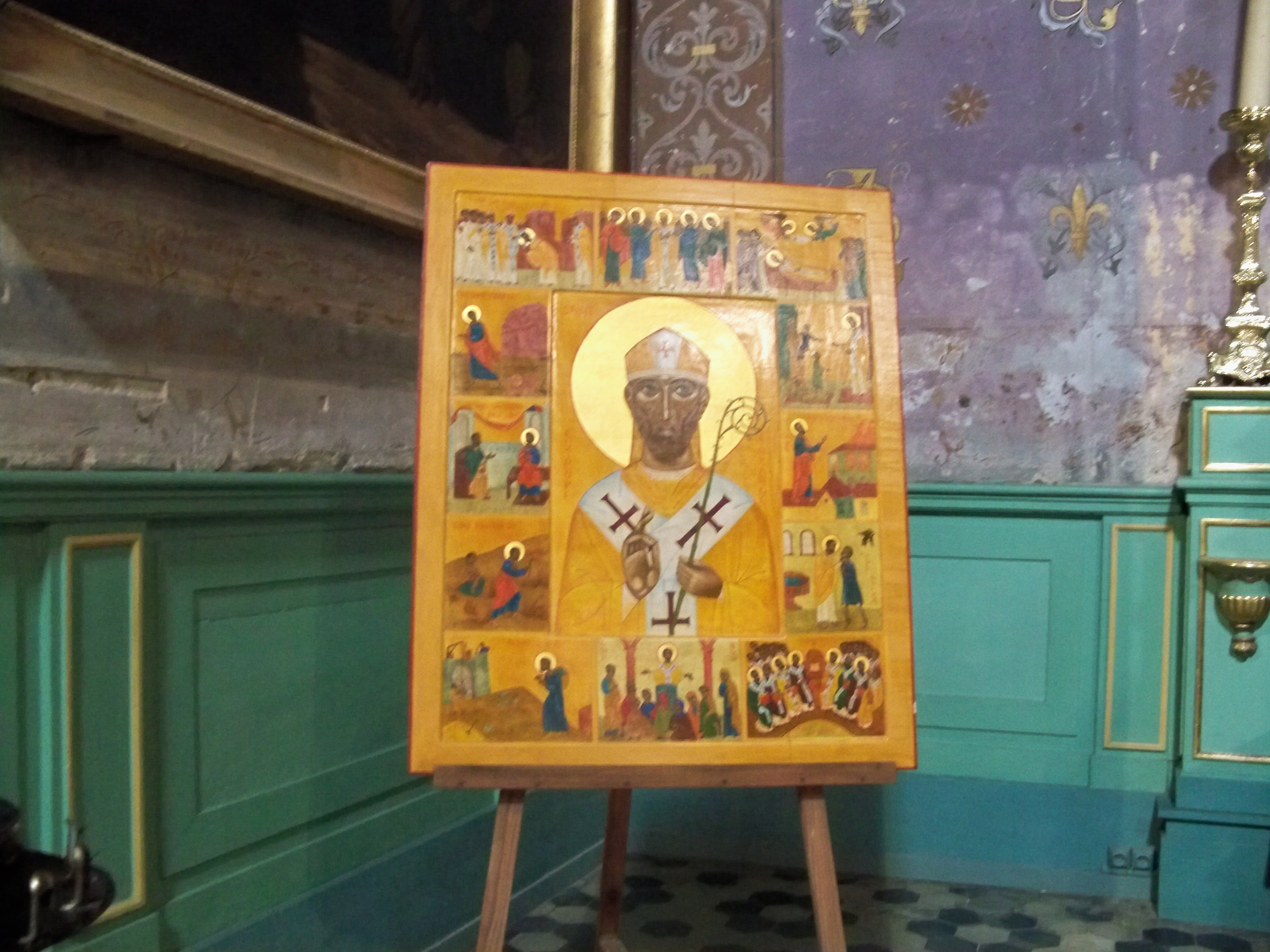
Icon of St. Eutropius of Orange. (Cathedrale Notre-Dame-de-Nazareth, in Orange, Vaucluse, France).

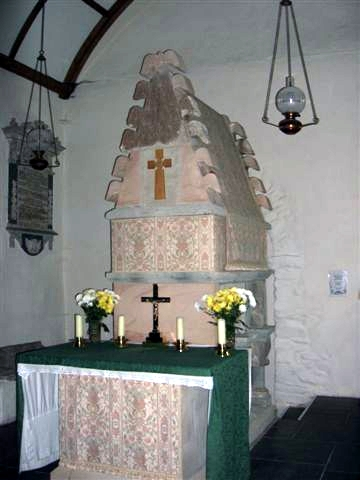
Shrine of St. Melangell.

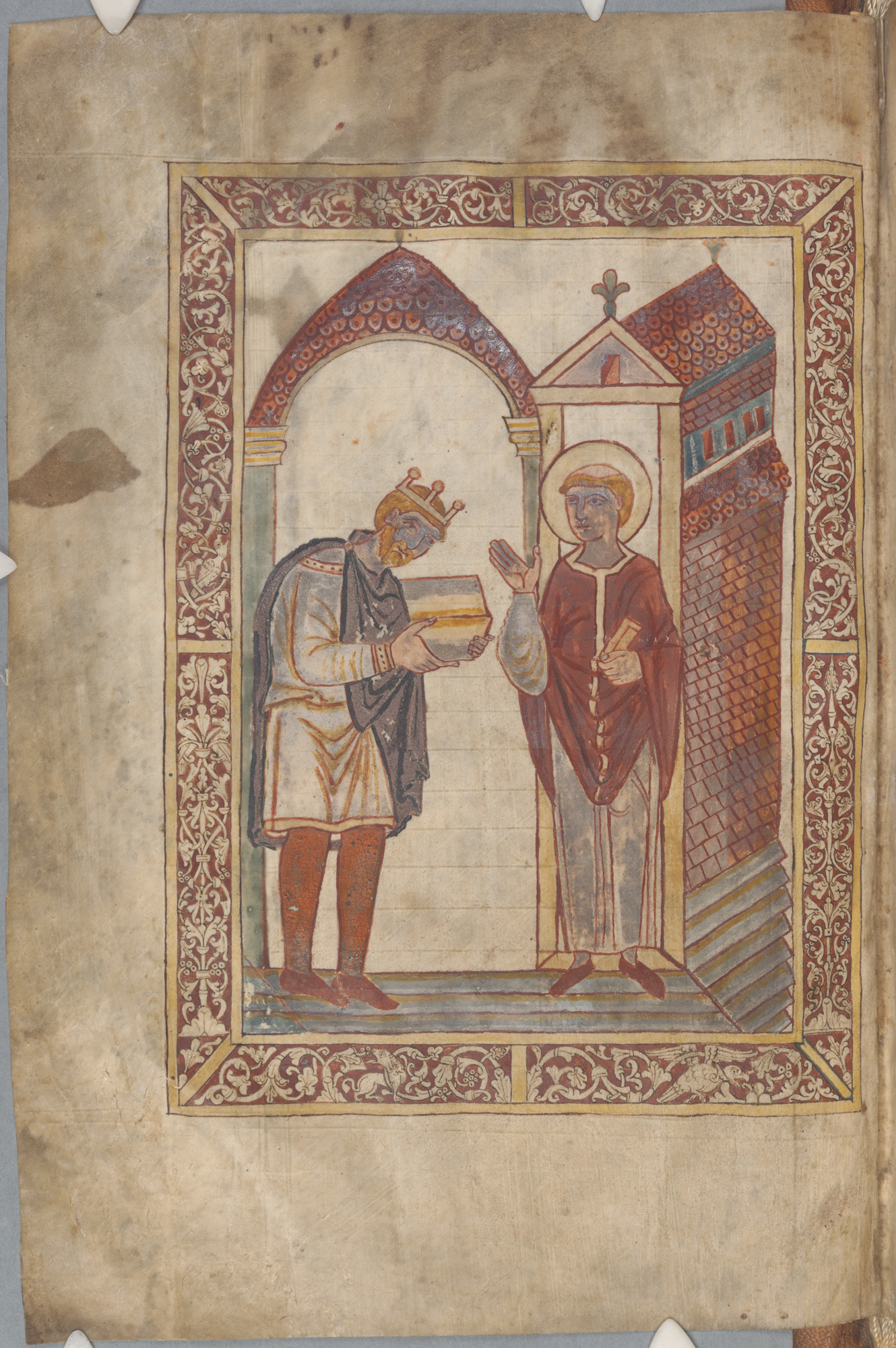
A page from a copy of Bede's Lives of St. Cuthbert, showing King Athelstan presenting the work to the St. Bede. This manuscript was given to St. Cuthbert's shrine in 934.

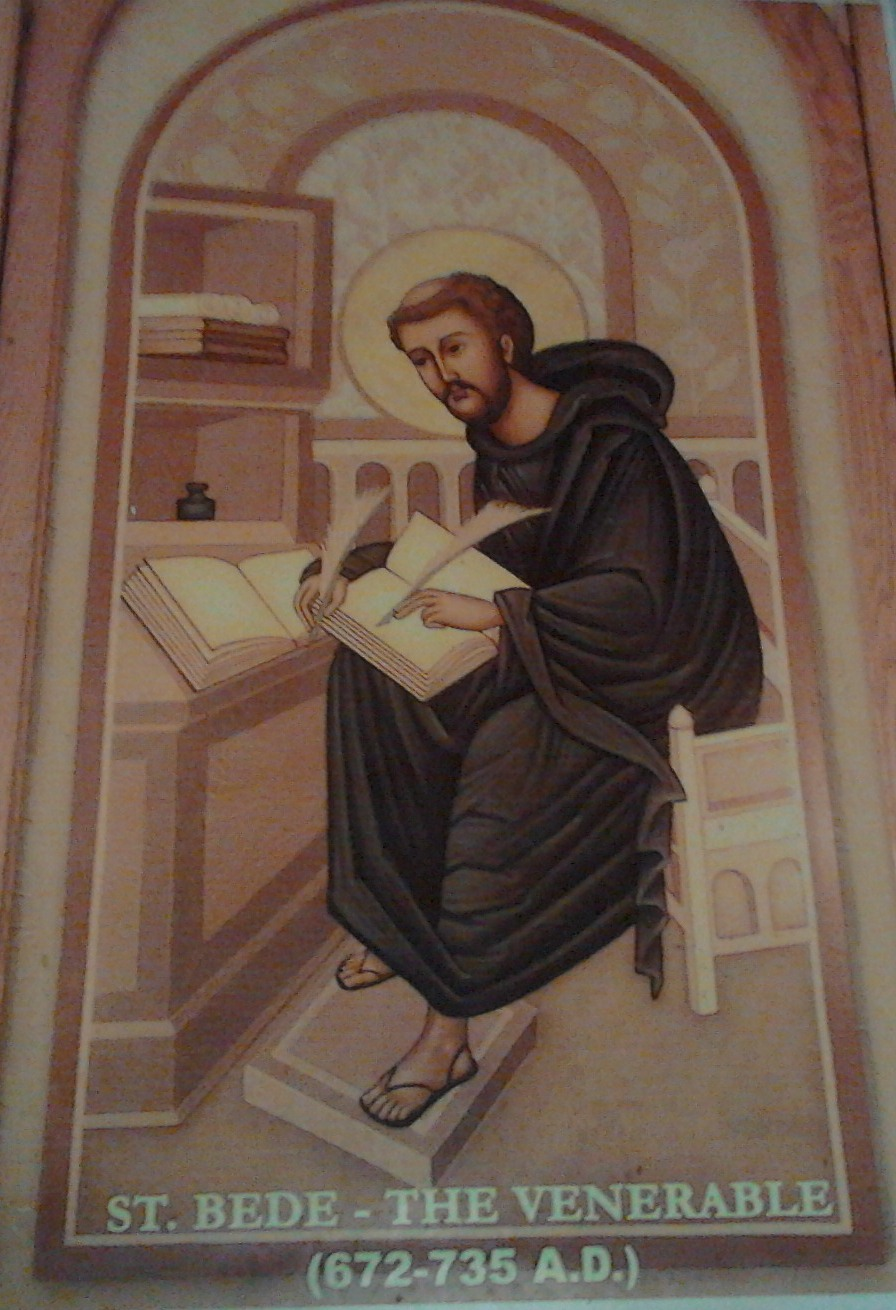
St. Bede the Venerable.

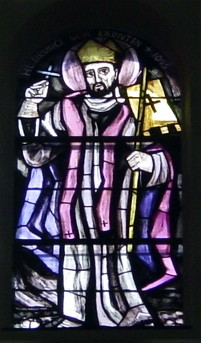
Saint Bruno of Würzburg in a stained glass window from the parish church of Liesing.

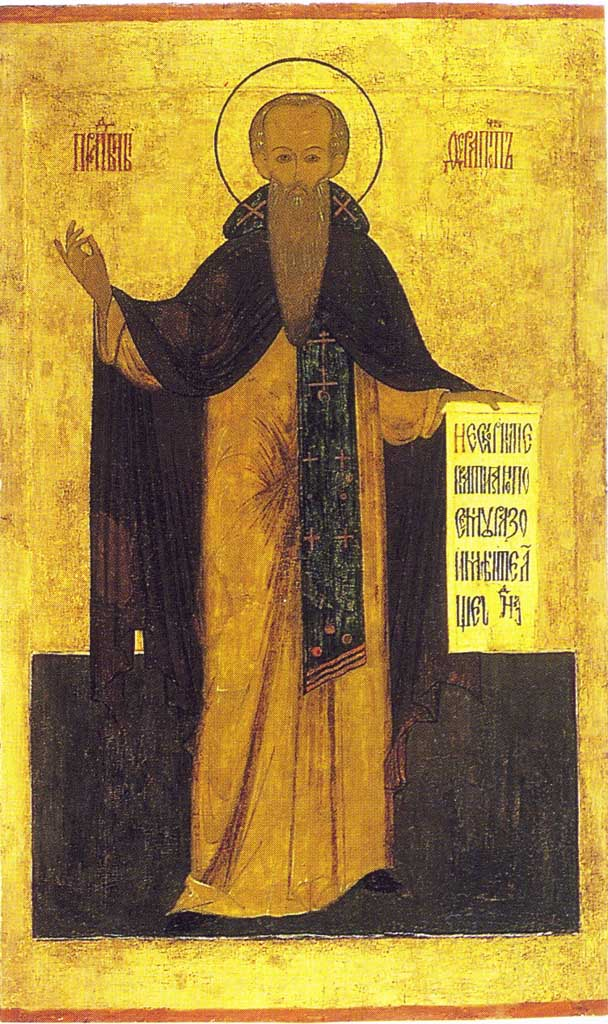
St. Therapont of White Lake.

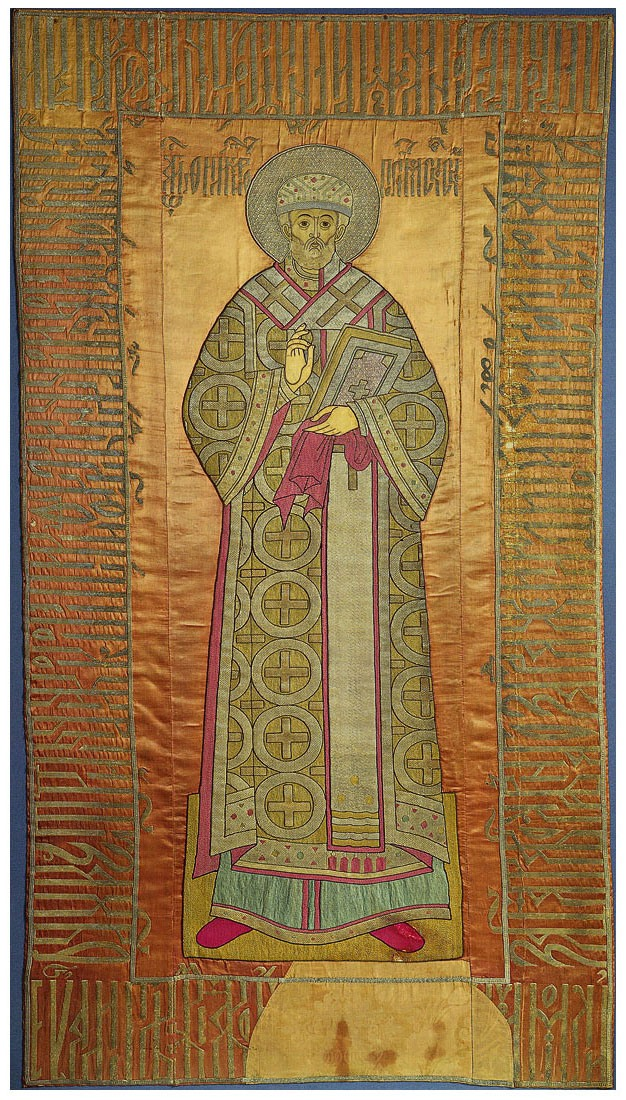
St. Philip I, Metropolitan of Moscow.

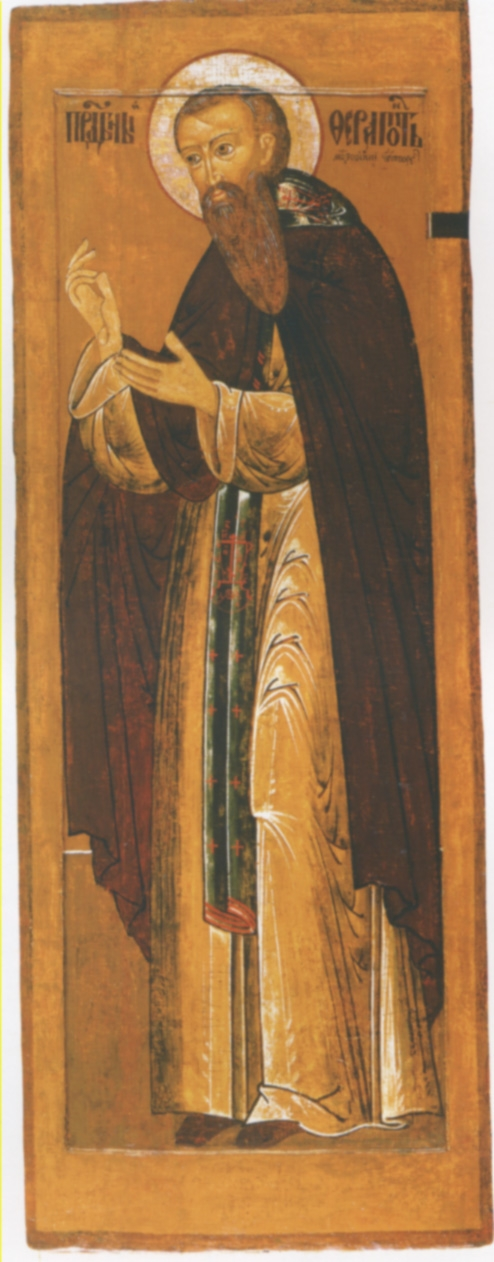
Venerable Therapont of Monza, Abbot of Monza.

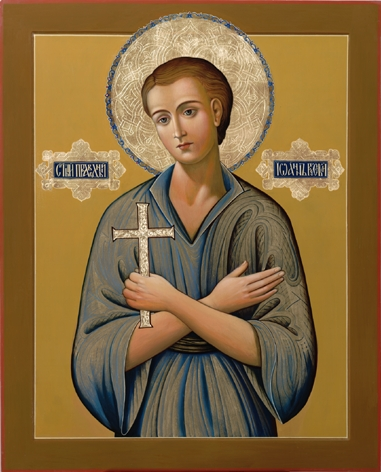
St. John the Russian, whose relics are on the island of Euboea.

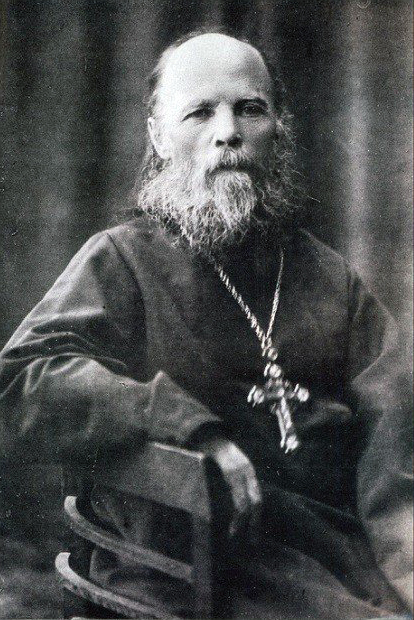
St Alexey (Mechev), Priest of Moscow.

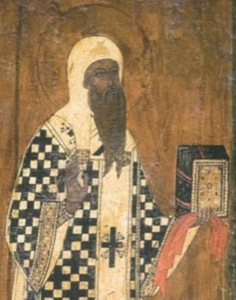
St. Cyprian, Metropolitan of Moscow.

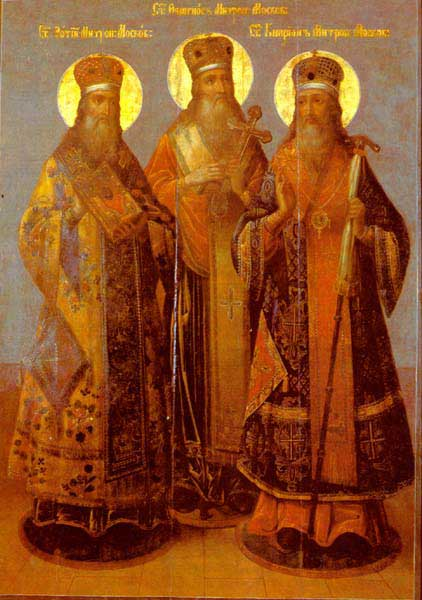
Sts. Photius, Theognostus and Cyprian, Metropolitans of Kiev and all Rus'.

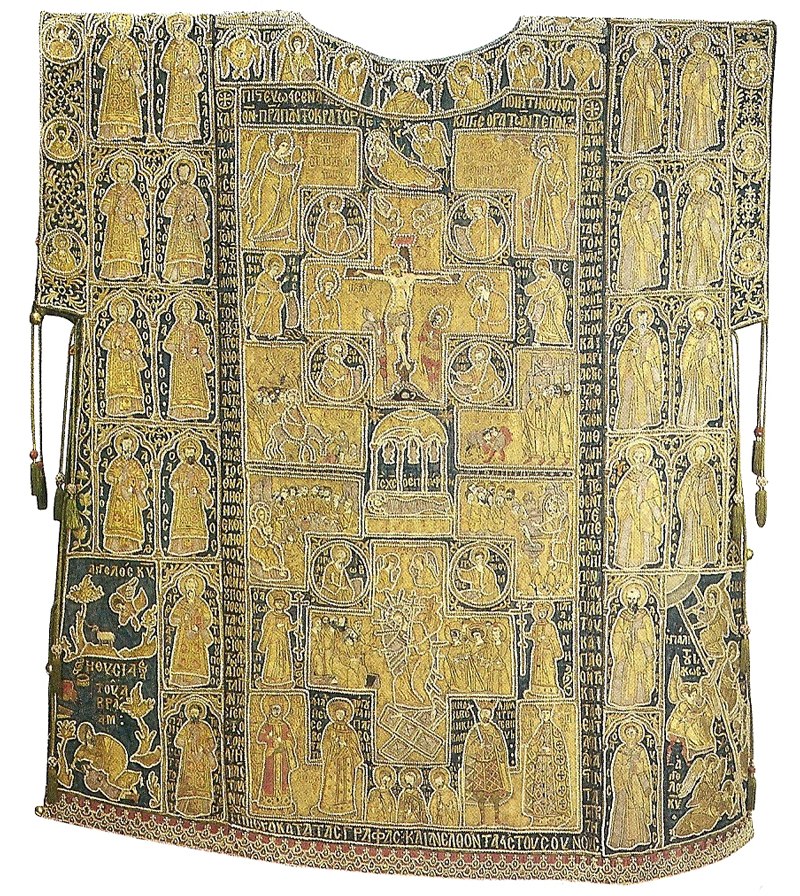
The Large Sakkos of Photius, created in the late Byzantine era for Photius, Metropolitan of Moscow around 1417.

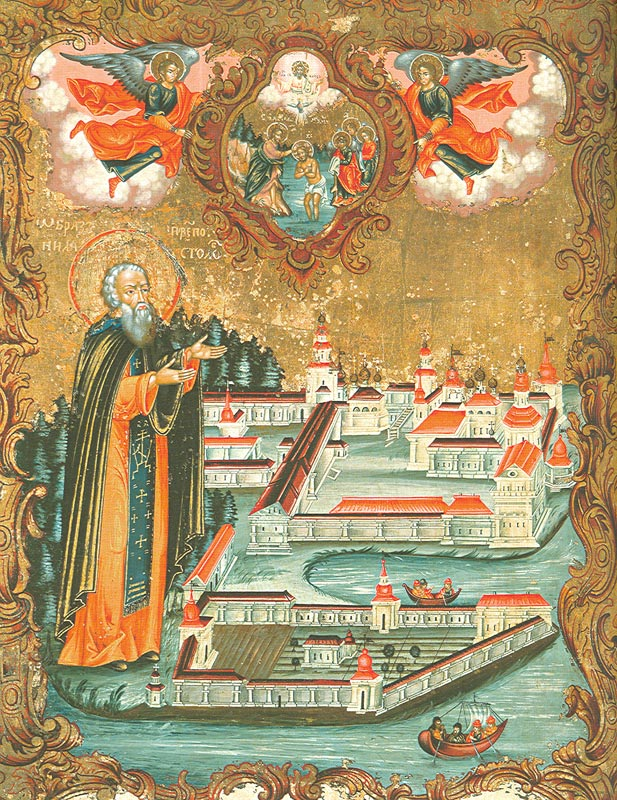
Venerable Nilus of Stolobny Island.

== Sources ==
- May 27/June 9. Orthodox Calendar (ORTHOCHRISTIAN.COM).
- June 9 / May 27. HOLY TRINITY RUSSIAN ORTHODOX CHURCH (A parish of the Patriarchate of Moscow).
- May 27. OCA - The Lives of the Saints.
- May 27. Latin Saints of the Orthodox Patriarchate of Rome.
- May 27. The Roman Martyrology.

Greek Sources

- Great Synaxaristes: (in Greek) 27 ΜΑΪΟΥ. ΜΕΓΑΣ ΣΥΝΑΞΑΡΙΣΤΗΣ.
- (in Greek) Συναξαριστής. 27 Μαΐου. ECCLESIA.GR. (H ΕΚΚΛΗΣΙΑ ΤΗΣ ΕΛΛΑΔΟΣ).

Russian Sources

- (in Russian) 9 июня (27 мая). Православная Энциклопедия под редакцией Патриарха Московского и всея Руси Кирилла (электронная версия). (Orthodox Encyclopedia - Pravenc.ru).
- (in Russian) 27 мая (ст.ст.) 9 июня 2013 (нов. ст.). Русская Православная Церковь Отдел внешних церковных связей. (DECR).
