= May 28 (Eastern Orthodox liturgics) =

Day in the Eastern Orthodox liturgical calendar

Eastern Orthodox liturgical calendar
May 27	May 28	May 29
May 28 O.S. ≍ June 10 N.S. May 28 N.S ≍ May 15 O.S.

An Eastern Orthodox cross

May 28 in Eastern Orthodox liturgical calendars is a feast day and a day of commemoration of saints and martyrs. Although some Orthodox churches use the Revised Julian Calendar and others use the traditional Julian calendar, the fixed commemorations for their respective May 28 are broadly the same, no matter which calendar is used. (Note: Despite the dates being the same, the days to which they refer typically differ by 13 days. The notation Old Style or O.S. is sometimes used to indicate a date in the traditional Julian Calendar (the "Old Calendar"). The notation New Style or N.S. indicates a date in the Revised Julian calendar (the "New Calendar").)

== Saints ==
- Hieromartyr Eutychius of Melitene, Bishop of Melitene (1st century)
- Woman martyr Heliconis of Thessalonica (244) (Note: "At Corinth, St. Helconides, martyr, who was first subjected to torments in the reign of Emperor Gordian, under the governor Perennius, and then again tortured under his successor Justin, but was delivered by an angel. Her breasts were cut away, she was exposed to wild beasts and to fire, and finally her martyrdom was fulfilled by beheading.")
- Saint Alexander, Bishop of Thessalonica (4th century) (Note: Archbishop Alexander took part in the First Ecumenical Council in Nicaea in 325 AD.)
- Hieromartyr Helladius of the East, bishop (4th century) (Note: The Hieromartyr Helladius the Bishop was thrown into fire because of his faith in Christ, but he remained unharmed. He died as a martyr from the terrible beating inflicted upon him. In the Service to St Helladius it is said that the Lord Jesus Christ visited him in prison and healed him of his wounds. According to certain sources, St Helladius suffered under the Persians during their invasion into the Eastern part of the Roman Empire in the fourth century.) (see also May 27)
- Venerable Nicetas the Confessor, Archbishop of Chalcedon, with his kinsmen Sts. Nicetas and Ignatius (8th century) (Note: His memory, along with a service in his honour, is recorded in the Codex Athous Lavrensis. It states that he was the Bishop of Chalcedon between 726AD - 775 AD, and courageously opposed the iconoclastic heresy. He reposed in peace.) (Not to be confused with Nicetas of Medikion - April 3)
- Blessed Andrew of Constantinople, Fool-for-Christ of Constantinople (911)
- Venerable Virgin-Martyr Philothea (Philothea of Pamphylia), Wonderworker (Note: According to her hagiography in the Great Synaxaristes, Virgin-Martyr Philothea was born in Molyvoto in Pamphylia in Asia Minor. Her parents, the Patrician John and his wife Irene, gave her a Christian upbringing, but they died when Philothea was still young. From her youth she was interested in the ascetic life. When she was 14 years old she was obliged to marry a 17-year-old named Constantine, however she was able to convince him that they should preserve their virginity, and not know each other, following the example of Venerable Ammon of Egypt (mid-4th century, October 4). Her husband became a priest but died six years later. Philothea then sold all the family wealth, giving the proceeds to the poor, to churches, and monasteries, and withdrew to an island in the middle of a lake, near Molyvoto. She practiced fasting, prayer, and all-night vigils, and her asceticism became well-known in the region, and God blessed her as a Wonderworker. She reposed in peace, and her holy relics were enshrined in the church of the Most Holy Theotokos. Later her holy relics were transferred from Eastern Thrace to Tarnovo, capital of the Second Bulgarian Empire, by decree of Tsar Kaloyan of Bulgaria (1197-1207). In Tarnovo, her sacred relics were credited with many miracles and curing the sick. In 1395 AD, after Tarnovo was captured by the Ottoman Turks, her holy relics were transferred in a grand procession to Vidin. However in 1396 the Ottoman Turks captured Vidin as well, and the Virgin-Martyr's holy relics were lost in the ensuing chaos. They were discovered again in the second half of the 16th century in Argesh in Wallachia, Romania.)

== Pre-Schism Western saints ==
- Martyrs Crescens, Paul, Dioscorides and Helladius, of Rome (244)
- Martyrs Aemilius, Felix, Priamus, and Lucian, in Sardinia. (Note: Churches are dedicated to these saints in Sardinia.)
- Saint Senator of Milan, Bishop of Milan, (480)
- Hieromartyr Caraunus (Ceraunus, Cheron), Deacon, near Chartres (5th century)
- Saint Justus of Urgell, first recorded Bishop of Urgell, in Catalonia in Spain (527) (Note: He wrote a commentary on the Song of Songs.)
- Saint Germain of Paris (Germanus), Bishop of Paris (576) (Note: St Germanus was given the title of 'father of the poor'.)
- Saint William of Gellone, built a monastery at Gellone in Gaul, later named Saint-Guilhem-le-Désert (812)
- Saint Podius, Bishop of Florence from 990, and Confessor (1002)

== Post-Schism Orthodox saints ==
- Saint Ignatius of Rostov, Bishop and Wonderworker of Rostov (1288) (Note: See: (in Russian) Игнатий I (епископ Ростовский). Википедии. (Russian Wikipedia).)
- Saint Gerontius, Metropolitan of Moscow (1489)
- Venerable Sophronius of Bulgaria, Monk (1510)
- Saint Elena (Manturova), Nun of Diveyevo (1832) (Note: See: (in Russian) Елена Дивеевская. Википедии. (Russian Wikipedia).)
- Blessed Domnica (Likvinenko), Ascetic of Cherson (1967)

=== New martyrs and confessors ===
- New Martyr Demetrius (Mitros) of Tripolitsa (1794)
- New Hieromartyr Zachariah, Priest of Prusa (1802)
- New Hieromartyr Macarius (Morzhov), Hieromonk of Zosima Hermitage, Smolensk (1931)
- New Hieromartyr Dionisius (Petushkov), Hiero-Schemamonk of the St. Nilus of Stolobny Hermitage, Tver (1931)
- New Hieromartyr Nicholas Aristov, Deacon (1931)
- Martyrs Iganatius Markov and Peter Yudin (1931) (Note: See: (in Russian) Марков, Игнатий Артемьевич. Википедии. (Russian Wikipedia).)
- New Hiero-confessor Rodion (Fyodorov), Archimandrite, of the Holy Trinity–St. Sergius Lavra (1933)
- New Confessor Heraclius (Motyakh), Schemamonk, of Turkistan (1937) (Note: See: (in Russian) Свято-Троицкий Иссык-Кульский монастырь. Википедии. (Russian Wikipedia).)
- New Virgin-Martyr Hermogenas Kadomtseva (1942)

== Other commemorations ==
- Icon of the Mother of God of Nicea (304)
- Synaxis of the Galich "Umilenie-Tenderness" Icon of the Mother of God (1350) (Note: See: (in Russian) Галичская икона Божией Матери. Википедии. (Russian Wikipedia).) (see also: July 20, August 15)

== Icon gallery ==
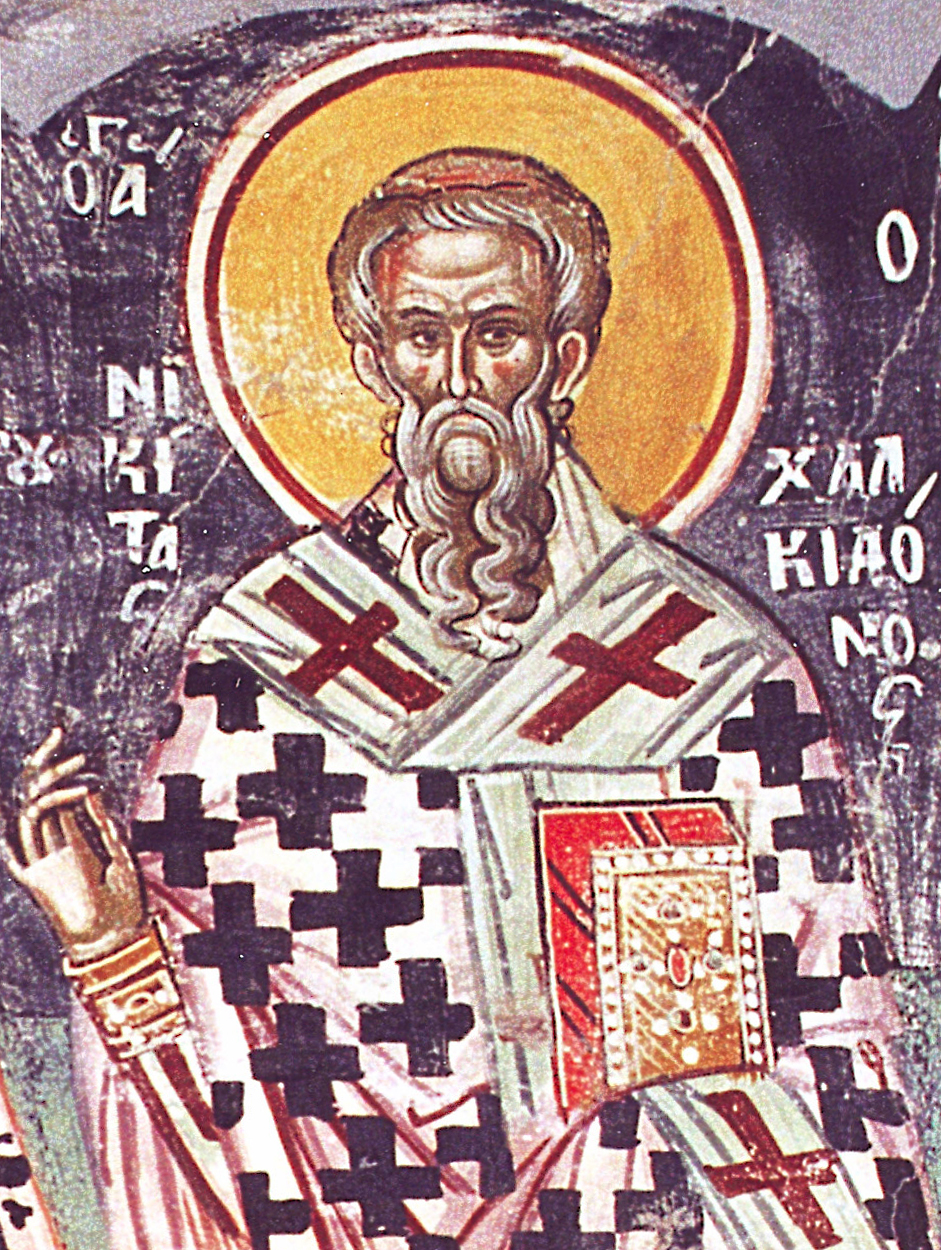
St. Nicetas the Confessor, Archbishop of Chalcedon.

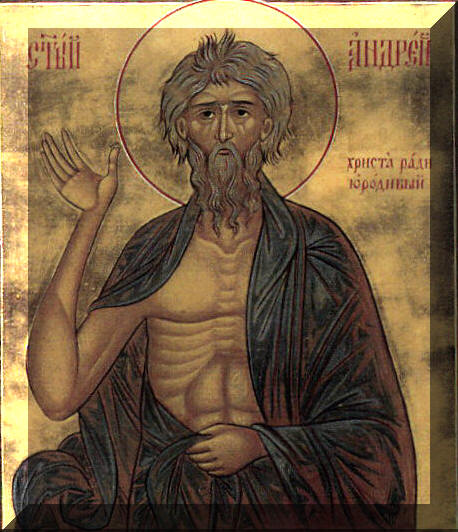
St. Andrew of Constantinople.

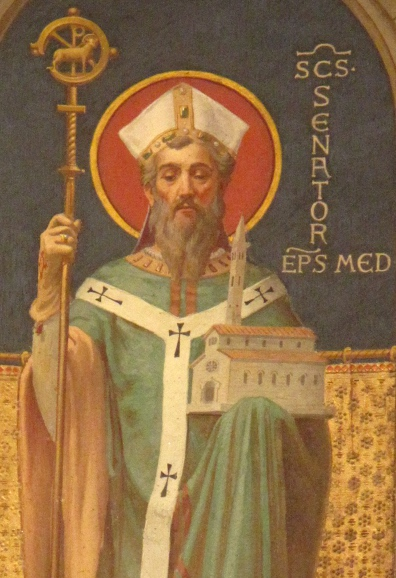
St. Senator of Milan.

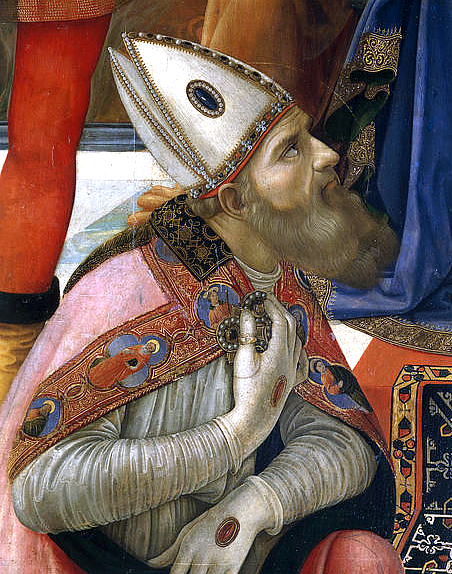
St. Justus of Urgell.

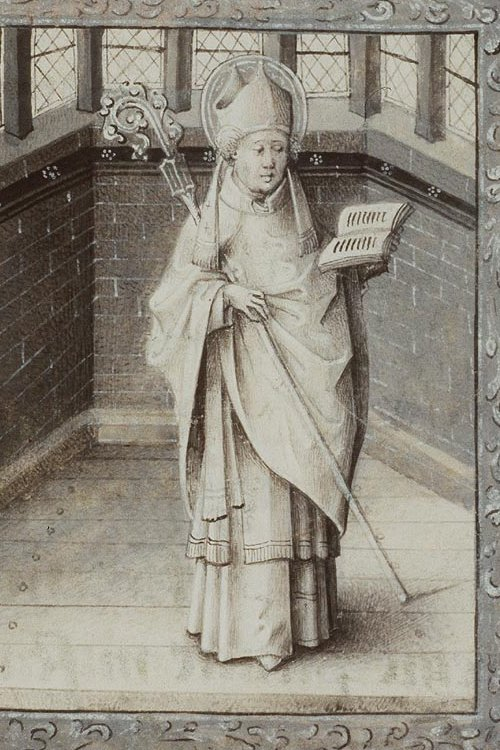
St. Germain of Paris (from a Book of Hours illuminated by Jean le Tavernier, c. 1450-1460).

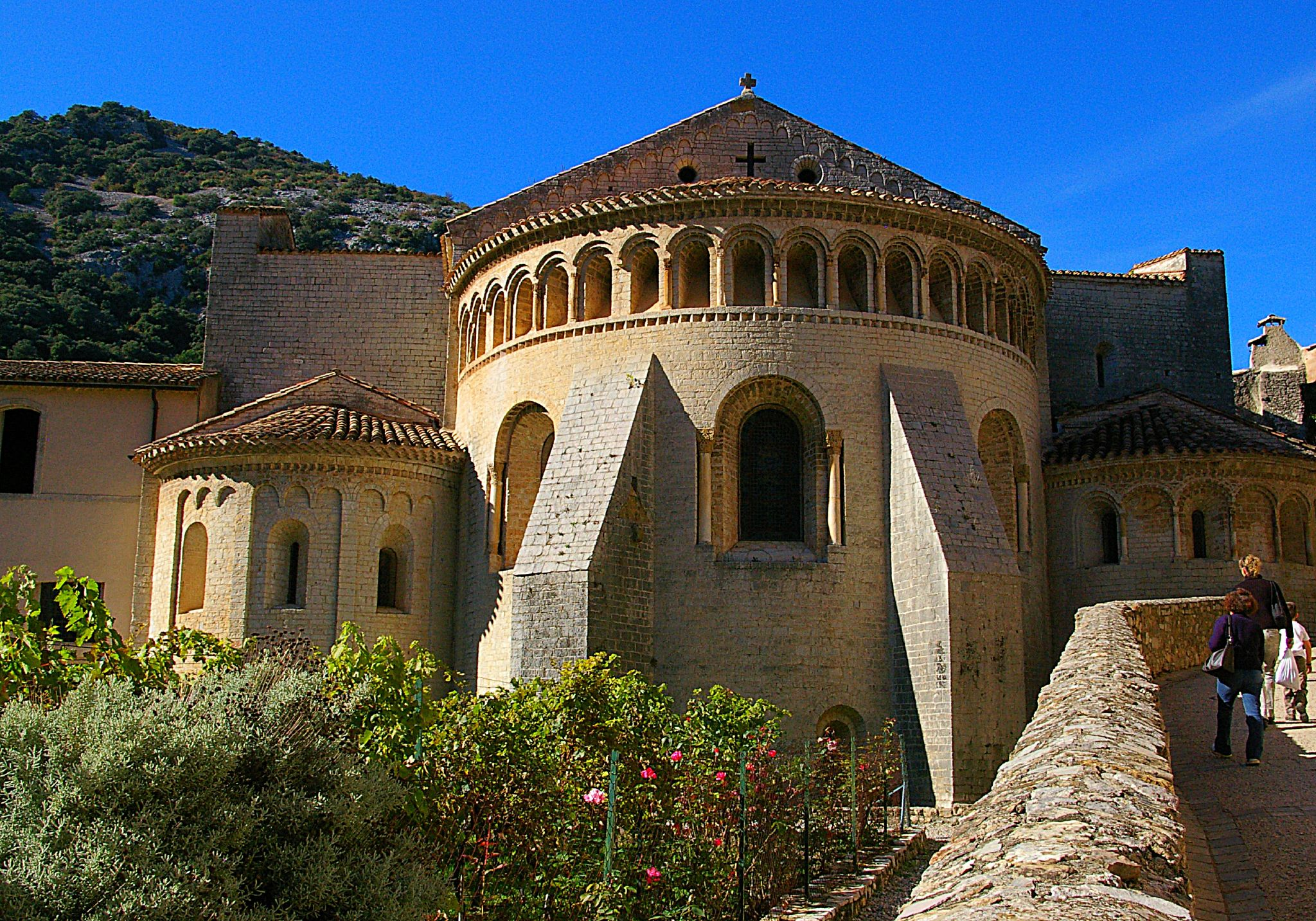
Romanesque apse of Saint-Guilhem-le-Désert, in Hérault, France - the monastery William of Gellone founded in 804 and entered in 806.

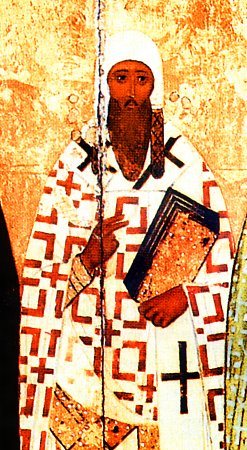
St. Ignatius of Rostov.

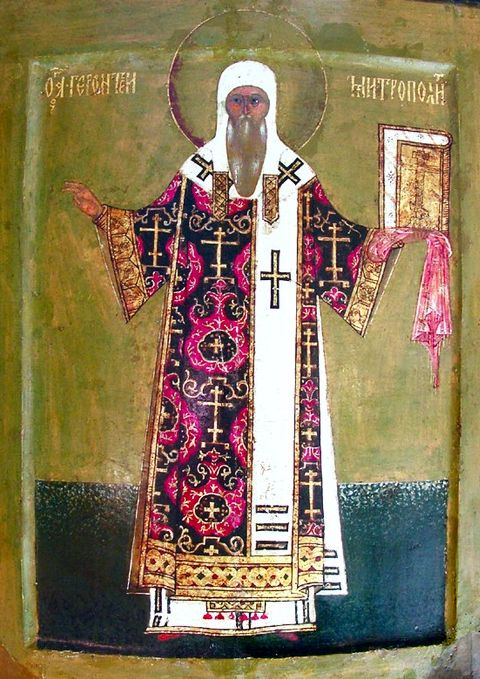
St. Gerontius, Metropolitan of Moscow.

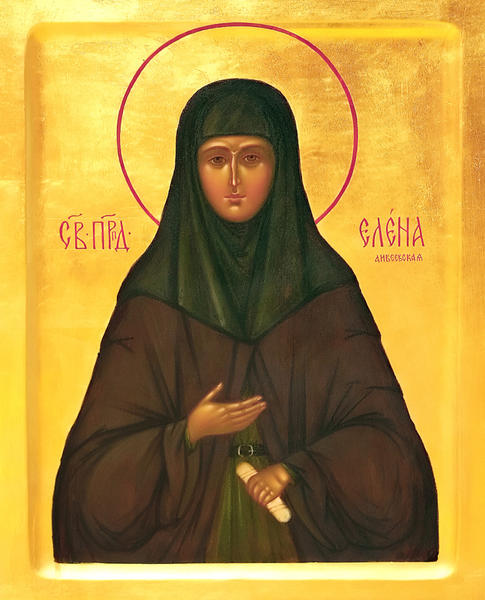
St. Elena (Manturova), Nun of Diveyevo.

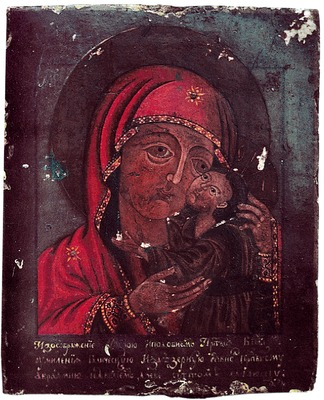
Galich "Umilenie-Tenderness" Icon of the Mother of God.

== Sources ==
- May 28/June 10. Orthodox Calendar (ORTHOCHRISTIAN.COM).
- June 10 / May 28. HOLY TRINITY RUSSIAN ORTHODOX CHURCH (A parish of the Patriarchate of Moscow).
- May 28. OCA - The Lives of the Saints.
- May 28. Latin Saints of the Orthodox Patriarchate of Rome.
- May 28. The Roman Martyrology.

Greek Sources

- Great Synaxaristes: (in Greek) 28 ΜΑΪΟΥ. ΜΕΓΑΣ ΣΥΝΑΞΑΡΙΣΤΗΣ.
- (in Greek) Συναξαριστής. 28 Μαΐου. ECCLESIA.GR. (H ΕΚΚΛΗΣΙΑ ΤΗΣ ΕΛΛΑΔΟΣ).

Russian Sources

- (in Russian) 10 июня (28 мая). Православная Энциклопедия под редакцией Патриарха Московского и всея Руси Кирилла (электронная версия). (Orthodox Encyclopedia - Pravenc.ru).
- (in Russian) 28 мая (ст.ст.) 10 июня (нов. ст.). Русская Православная Церковь Отдел внешних церковных связей. (DECR).
