= Helladius =

Helladius may refer to:

- Alexander Helladius (1686–?), Greek scholar and humanist
- Helladius (4th century hieromartyr)
- Helladius of Kiev, Ukrainian monk and saint
- Helladius of Auxerre (died 387), Christian bishop and saint
- Helladius of Caesarea, Christian bishop, named by an edict of Theodosius I (30 July 381) to an episcopal see
- Helladius (grammarian), grammarian, professor, and a priest of Zeus
- Helladius of Ptolemais, Christian bishop, present at the First Council of Ephesus (431)
- Helladius of Tarsus, Christian bishop, condemned at the First Council of Ephesus (431)
- Helladius of Toledo (died 633), Christian bishop and saint
- Helladius and Theophilus, two Christian martyrs in Libya, feast day 8 January
- Helladius, Crescentius, Paul and Dioscorides, Christian martyrs, feast day 28 May
