= Metropolitan Philip (disambiguation) =

Metropolitan Philip may refer to:

- Philip I, Metropolitan of Moscow in 1464–1473
- Philip II, Metropolitan of Moscow in 1566–1568
- Philip Saliba, Metropolitan of All North America of the Antiochian Orthodox Christian Archdiocese of North America in 1966–2014
