= Joshua's Vision of St Michael =

13th-century Russian icon

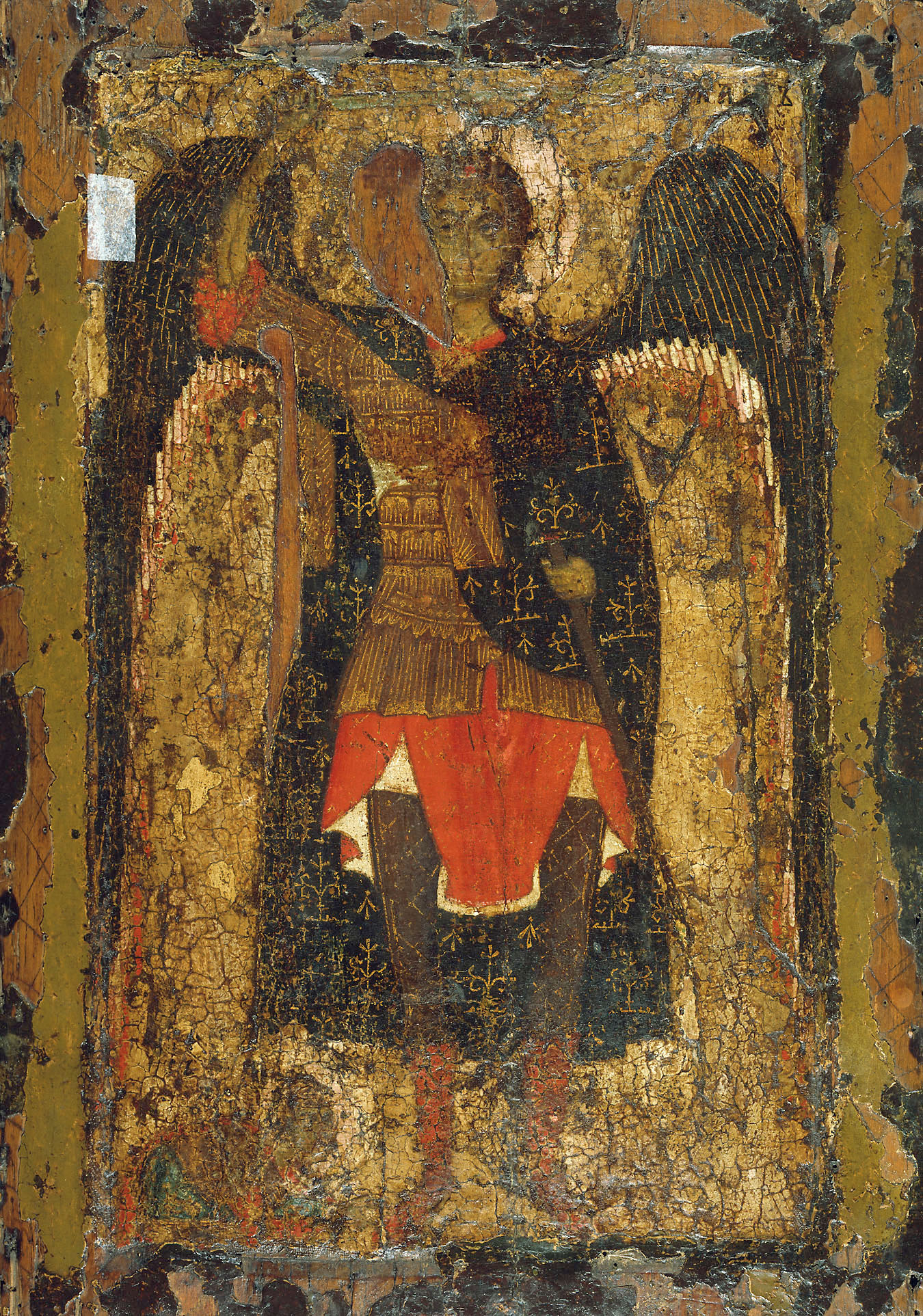
Joshua's Vision of St Michael (13th century icon)

Joshua's Vision of St Michael or The Apparition of the Archangel Michael to Joshua is a 13th-century Russian icon. It is exhibited in Dormition Cathedral in Moscow. It shows an episode in Joshua 5.13–15, where "a man [...] with a drawn sword in his hand" appeared to Joshua – that man was later interpreted as Michael the Archangel.

== History ==
The icon seems to have originated in the church dedicated to St Michael on the site of the present-day Cathedral of the Archangel in Moscow. The earlier church was built by Mikhail Khorobrit, a prince of Moscow. According to Igor Grabar, "if [the author of the icon] was not Byzantine, he was Suzdalian", although there is no precise attribution.

It along with the Saviour with Golden Hair were moved to the Dormition Cathedral in Moscow under Vasili III and Metropolitan Varlaam. It was discovered in the 1920s by the researchers of the Russian Restoration Commission. In 1927, it appeared in the "Third Restoration Exhibition", organised by the Igor Grabar Centre for Scientific and Artistic Restoration in Russia, followed by "Russian Art of the Scythians to the Present-Day" in Paris in 1966–1967.
