= Metropolitan Theodosius =

Metropolitan Theodosius may refer to:

- Theodosius, Metropolitan of Moscow in 1461–1464
- Theodosius (Lazor), primate of the Orthodox Church in America (OCA) in 1977–2002
