= Simon, Metropolitan of Moscow =

Metropolitan of Moscow from 1495 to 1511

Simon
- Metropolitan of Moscow and all Russia
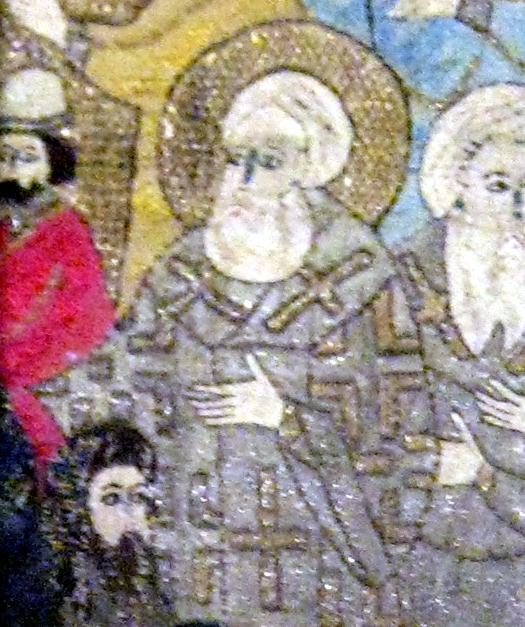
- Church: Russian Orthodox Church
- See: Moscow
- Installed: 1495
- Term ended: 1511
- Predecessor: Zosimus
- Successor: Varlaam

Personal details
- Died: 28 January 1512

Simon (Russian: Симон; died 1512) was Metropolitan of Moscow and all Rus', the primate of the Russian Orthodox Church, from 1495 to 1511. He was the sixth metropolitan in Moscow to be appointed without the approval of the Ecumenical Patriarch of Constantinople as had been the norm.

== Biography ==
Simon was a hegumen at the Troitse-Sergiyeva Lavra. In 1495, he was elected Metropolitan of Moscow after the removal of Zosimus on charges of heresy and sodomy. Simon soon won the respect of Ivan III.

In 1501, Simon wrote a letter to the clergy of Perm, asking them to admonish their flock, knyaz, and ruling elite to eradicate idolatry and pagan beliefs among ordinary people. Simon was the responsible for the convocation of the sobors in 1503 and 1504. The Sobor (Council) of 1503 condemned the charging of fees for the ordination of priests as simony, though the practice had been approved by the Moscow Council of 1270 and had been practiced in the Byzantine church for years before that.

As a result of the condemnation, Archbishop Gennady of Novgorod was condemned the following year for simony and removed from office. Despite this, the Sobor of 1504 condemned the Heresy of the Judaizers, which repudiated some of the dogmas and rites of the Russian Orthodox Church, thus confirming Gennady's major activity during his archiepiscopate. As a result of this sobor, many sectarians were either executed or imprisoned. The same sobor also dealt with the issue of debauchery among the widowed clergymen and deacons.

Simon is also known for having consecrated a number of monasteries, including the Novospassky Monastery, St. George Monastery, and Yauza Monastery.

== Sources ==
- "Симон, митрополит московский" . Brockhaus and Efron Encyclopedic Dictionary (in Russian). 1906.

Eastern Orthodox Church titles
Preceded by Zosimus	Metropolitan of Moscow and all Rus'; 1495–1511	Succeeded by Varlaam
