= Theodosius, Metropolitan of Moscow =

Metropolitan of Moscow from 1461 to 1464

Theodosius
- Metropolitan of Moscow and all Russia
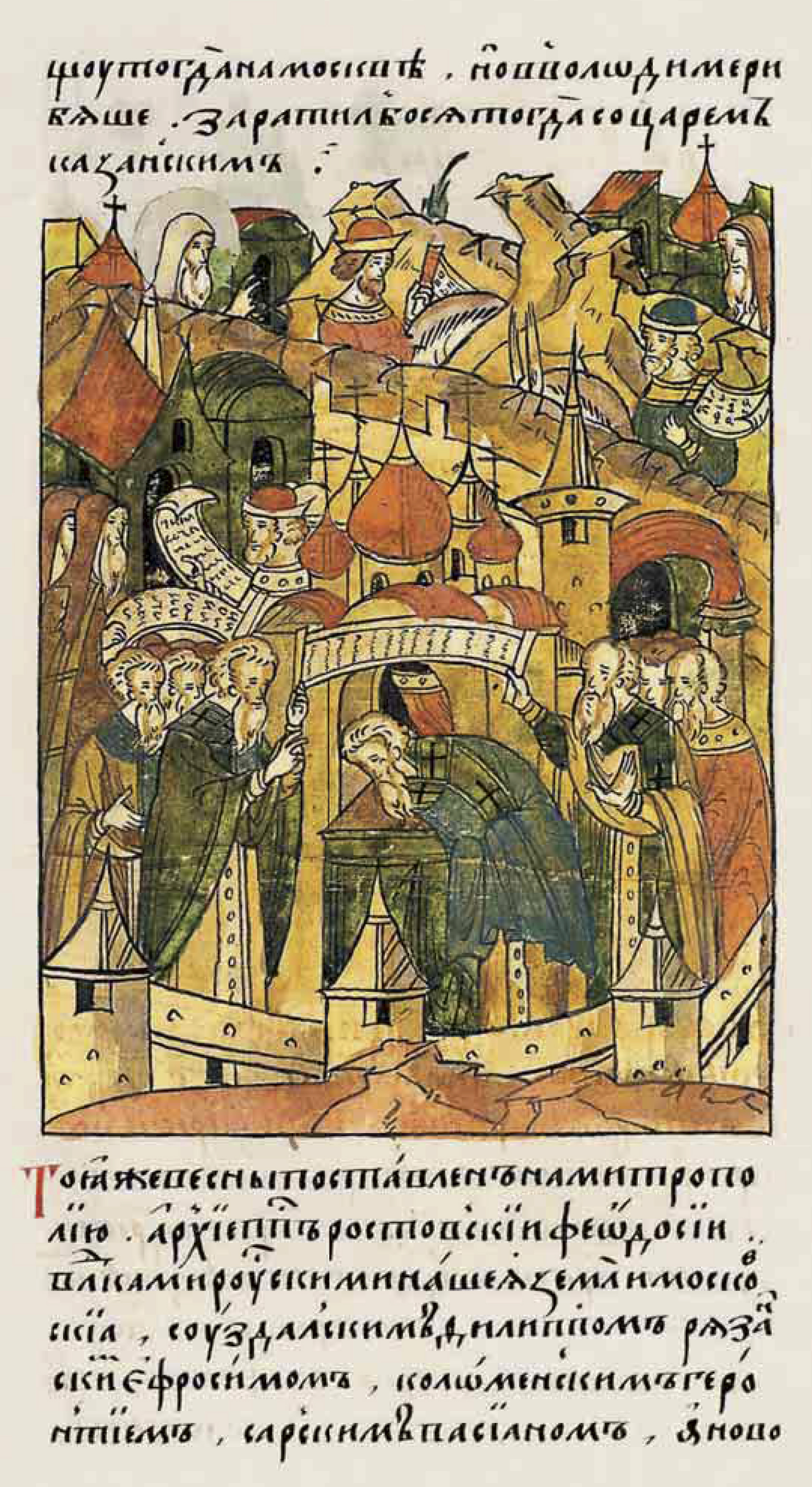
- Miniature from the Illustrated Chronicle of Ivan the Terrible
- Church: Russian Orthodox Church
- See: Moscow
- Installed: 1461
- Term ended: 1464
- Predecessor: Jonah
- Successor: Philip I

Personal details
- Died: 15 October 1475

Theodosius Byvaltsev (Russian: Феодосий Бывальцев; died 1475) was Metropolitan of Moscow and all Rus', the primate of the Russian Orthodox Church, from 1461 to 1464. He was the second metropolitan in Moscow to be appointed without the approval of the Ecumenical Patriarch of Constantinople as had been the norm.

== Biography ==
In 1454, when Theodosius was still archimandrite of the Moscow Kremlin's Chudov Monastery, he was promoted to the office of Archbishop of Rostov. After the death of Metropolitan Jonah in 1461, Theodosius became Metropolitan of Moscow in early May 1461.

Theodosius's appointment marked a new period of actual independence of the Russian Orthodox Church from the patriarch of Constantinople. He was the first metropolitan appointed by the grand prince after the fall of Constantinople to the Turks (in 1453), although his predecessor, Jonah, is considered the first independent metropolitan, as he was appointed in 1448 without the approval of the patriarch of Constantinople. Theodosius' appointment was, however, eventually blessed by Philippi, Metropolitan of Caesarea, on behalf of the patriarch of Constantinople in April 1464.

Since his first days as a metropolitan, Theodosius sought to eradicate unscrupulousness among the priests and educating the clergy in his province. Theodosius's attempts at reshaping the clergy failed. When he started sifting through the priests and defrocking those unfit for preaching, many parishes were left without priests. Ordinary people had nothing against their priests, therefore, they started to voice their discontent and damn the metropolitan.

Theodosius also had to contend with a metropolitanate in Lithuania which threatened to take the western eparchies of the Province of Moscow, most notably Novgorod the Great, and was suspected of Latinizing, in which case these western regions would not only be lost to the Moscow metropolitan, but would go over to Catholicism and be lost to Orthodoxy altogether. The metropolitans of Lithuania had been opposed for several decades, going back at least to the tenure of Photius in Moscow, and would continue after Theodosius' tenure.

Theodosius resigned the metropolitan office and retired to Chudov Monastery, where he had previously been archimandrite, after only 3 years. He later transferred to the Troitse-Sergiyeva Lavra north of Moscow where he died in 1475. He is buried in the Troitse-Sergiyeva Lavra.

== See also ==
- List of metropolitans and patriarchs of Moscow

== Sources ==
- "Феодосий, митрополит московский" . Brockhaus and Efron Encyclopedic Dictionary (in Russian). 1906.

Preceded by Jonah of Moscow	Metropolitan of Moscow and all Russia; 1461–1464	Succeeded by Philip
