= Zosimus, Metropolitan of Moscow =

Metropolitan of Moscow from 1490 to 1494

Zosimus
- Metropolitan of Moscow and all Russia
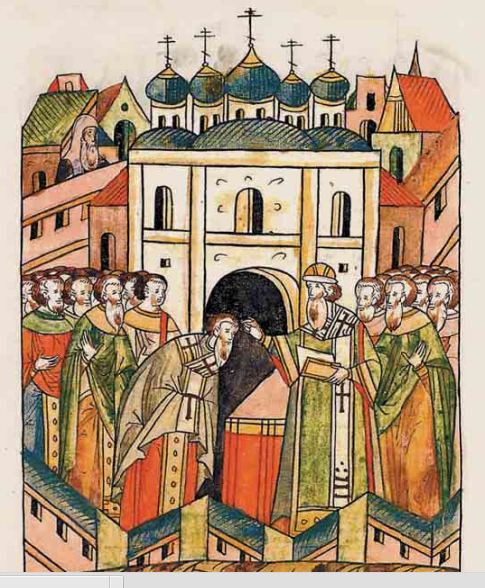
- Miniature from the Illustrated Chronicle of Ivan the Terrible
- Church: Russian Orthodox Church
- See: Moscow
- Installed: 1490
- Term ended: 1494
- Predecessor: Gerontius
- Successor: Simon

Personal details
- Died: 1494

Zosimus the Bearded (Russian: Зосима Брадатый'; died 1494) was Metropolitan of Moscow and all Rus', the primate of the Russian Orthodox Church, from 1490 to 1494. He was the fifth metropolitan in Moscow to be appointed without the approval of the Ecumenical Patriarch of Constantinople as had been the norm.

For the first time in Russian history, Zosimus was appointed metropolitan by the decision of the council of the Russian bishops by order of the Grand Prince Ivan III.

== Biography ==
He was the author of the work conceptualizing Moscow as the third Rome. He had been archimandrite of the Simonovskii Monastery in Moscow when he was picked to replace Metropolitan Gerontii some six months after Gerontii's death.

Archbishop Gennady of Novgorod had uncovered the Heresy of the Judaizers in 1487 and Zosimus's entire metropolitanate was overshadowed by this crisis. Gennady wrote a letter in 1490 to Zosimus and other bishops in the Russian church demanding a council be convened and the heresy be dealt with. The council convened less than a month after Zosimus' elevation to the metropolitan throne and condemned the heresy. Gennady demanded that the heretics be severely punished - hanged and burned - and not merely incarcerated, but Zosimus and Grand Prince Ivan III opposed these harsher methods. Zosimus was eventually accused of being a secret heretic and, on 17 May 1494, he was removed from the metropolitan throne on charges of heresy and sodomy. He died before any trial was held.

Zosimus is known for having compiled a list of banned books and written an epistle against heretics.

== Sources ==
- "Зосима, митрополит московский" . Brockhaus and Efron Encyclopedic Dictionary (in Russian). 1906.

Eastern Orthodox Church titles
Preceded by Gerontius	Metropolitan of Moscow and all Rus'; 1490–1494	Succeeded by Simon
