= Jonah of Moscow =

Metropolitan of Kiev from 1448 to 1461

Saint Jonah of Moscow
- Metropolitan of Kiev and all Rus'
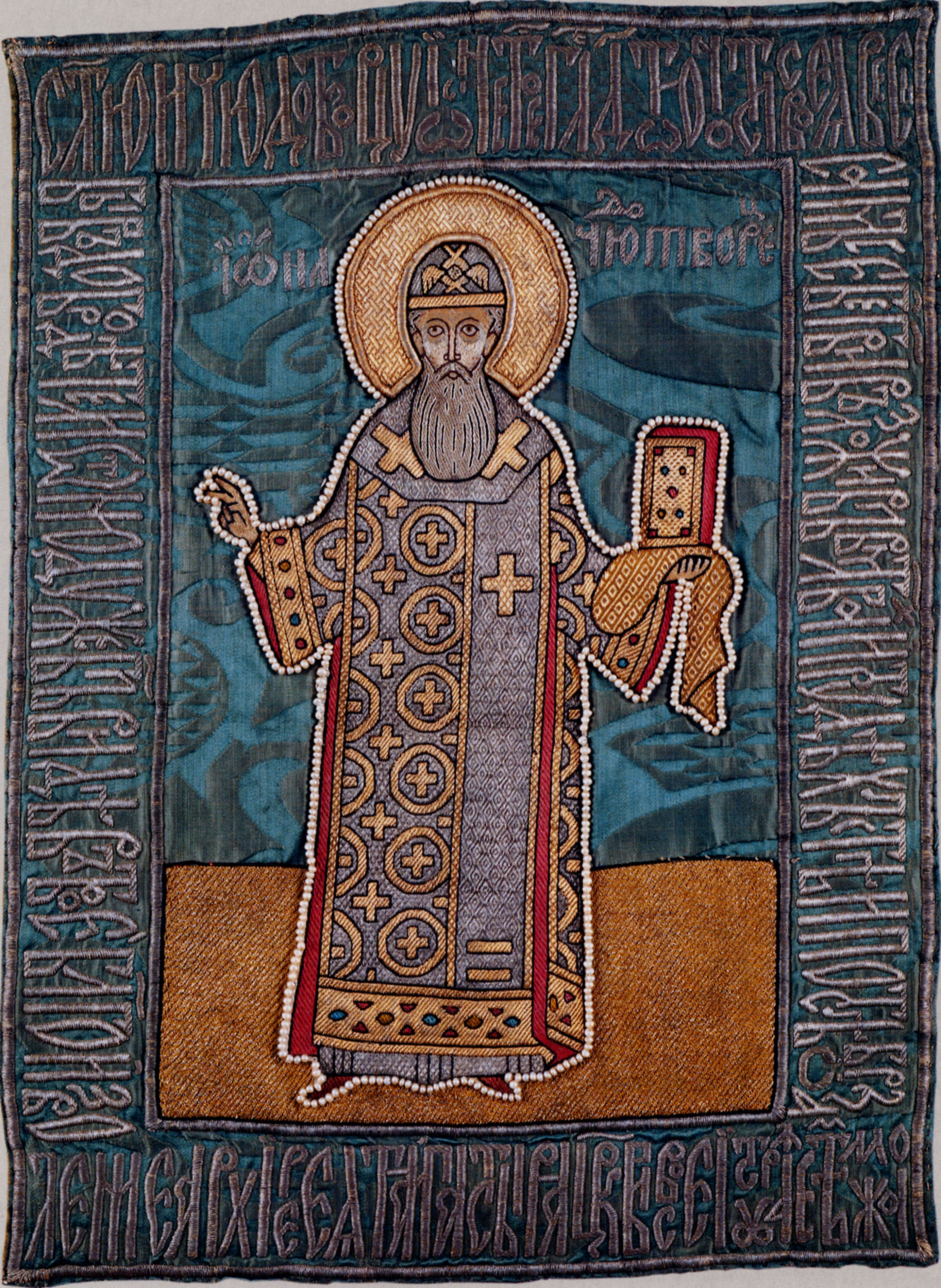
- Jonah on a shroud, 16th century
- Church: Russian Orthodox Church
- See: Moscow
- Installed: 1448
- Term ended: 1461
- Predecessor: Isidore
- Successor: Theodosius

Personal details
- Born: 1390s
- Died: 31 March 1461

Jonah of Moscow (Russian: Иона, romanized: Iona; died 31 March 1461) was Metropolitan of Kiev and all Rus', the primate of the Russian Orthodox Church, from 1448 until his death in 1461.

After Isidore was condemned for supporting the Union of Florence, Jonah was appointed as metropolitan by a council of Russian bishops at the behest of Vasily II of Moscow.

Like his immediate predecessors, he permanently resided in Moscow, and was the last Moscow-based metropolitan to keep the traditional title with reference to the metropolitan city of Kiev. He was also the first metropolitan in Moscow to be appointed without the approval of the Ecumenical Patriarch of Constantinople, as had been the norm, which marked the beginning of autocephaly of the Russian Orthodox Church. He is recognised as a saint in the Russian Orthodox Church.

== Career ==
From the late 1420s, Jonah had been living in the Simonov Monastery in Moscow and was close to Metropolitan Photius, who made him a bishop of Ryazan and Murom. Despite sporadic Russian attempts to pressure the patriarch of Constantinople into choosing a metropolitan from Russia's native population, most appointees remained Greeks. After Photius's death in 1431, Grand Prince Vasily II of Moscow nominated Jonah for the post of metropolitan, but Patriarch Joseph II of Constantinople chose Isidore to become the metropolitan.

After the death of Photius in 1431, Jonah was chosen by the grand prince of Moscow and a council of Russian bishops as the new metropolitan at the end of 1432. However, due to a succession crisis and civil strife in Moscow, he did not hurry to Constantinople to receive his ordination and did not decide to go to Constantinople until the middle of 1435. Meanwhile, at the request of the Lithuanian grand duke Švitrigaila, the bishop Gerasim was appointed as metropolitan, but the latter did not come to Moscow and remained metropolitan only in Lithuania. Soon, Švitrigaila suspected Gerasim of treason and executed him in 1435.

When Jonah finally arrived to Constantinople in 1436, the patriarch had already chosen the Greek bishop Isidore and appointed the latter as the new metropolitan. Isidore came to Moscow in 1437 and made a good impression there with his diplomatic skills and knowledge of the Slavonic language. However, only five months later, in September 1437, he left Moscow to participate to the Council of Florence for the unification of the Churches of Rome and Constantinople. Abraham of Suzdal was the only Russian prelate present and he signed the union, but, according to his companion Simeon, this was only under duress. Isidore brought the news of the Council to Moscow in 1441, and according to Russian sources, Vasily II along with a council of Russian bishops condemned the Council in order to protect the purity of the faith. Isidore escaped alive, while the metropolitan throne sat vacant for seven years, as no replacement had been sent by Constantinople. Vasily II convened a council in 1448 as a result.

Jonah was elected as metropolitan by a majority of Russian bishops in Moscow on 15 December 1448, without the consent of the patriarch of Constantinople. Although not all Russian clergy supported Jonah, the move was subsequently justified in the Russian point of view following the fall of Constantinople in 1453, which was interpreted as divine punishment. While it is possible that the failure to obtain the blessing from Constantinople was not intentional, nevertheless, this marked the beginning of autocephaly of the Russian Orthodox Church.

Jonah's first effort as metropolitan was to recover the areas lost to the Uniate church, and he was able to add Lithuania and Kiev to his title, but he was unable to gain Galicia. From 1451, Jonah purged the regions of Isidore's influence, but in 1458, Lithuania was separated from his jurisdiction. The influence of Catholicism increased in those regions until Casimir's inclination toward Orthodoxy was repressed and he accepted the demands of Pope Callixtus III.

As soon as Vasily II heard about the ordination of Gregory as metropolitan of the newly established metropolis of Kiev, he sent a delegation to the Polish ruler warning him to not accept Gregory. Jonah also tasked Vassian of the Trinity Lavra of St. Sergius and Kassian of the Kirillo-Belozersky Monastery with the goal of persuading local Russian feudal princes and nobles who resided in Lithuania to continue to side with Orthodoxy, but this attempt failed. The Polish–Lithuanian rulers of those lands ultimately supported Gregory. As a result, Jonah and Vasily II tacitly accepted the co-existence of two Russian Orthodox hierarchies.

Jonah died on 31 March 1461. He was buried in the Dormition Cathedral in the Moscow Kremlin. He was canonized by Macarius at the Moscow Council of 1547.

== Veneration ==
The Eastern Orthodox Church commemorates Jonah on the following dates.

- March 31: Date of Repose.
- May 27: Uncovering and Translation of Relics.
- June 15: Primary Feast.
- October 5: Synaxis of the Hierarchs of Moscow.

== Bibliography ==
- Crummey, Robert O. (6 June 2014). The Formation of Muscovy 1300 - 1613. Routledge. ISBN 978-1-317-87200-9.
- Fennell, John (14 January 2014) [1995]. A History of the Russian Church to 1488. Routledge. ISBN 978-1-317-89720-0.
- Shubin, Daniel H. (2004). A History of Russian Christianity, Vol. I: From the Earliest Years through Tsar Ivan IV. Algora Publishing. ISBN 978-0-87586-287-3.

Preceded by Isidore	Metropolitan of Kiev and all Rus'; 1448–1461	Succeeded by Theodosius
