= Helladius, Crescentius, Paul and Dioscorides =

Martyrs
- Died: 244 or 326
- Honored in: Catholic Church and Orthodox Church
- Feast: May 28

Saints Helladius, Crescentius, Paul and Dioscorides are honored as Christian martyrs who were burned to death in Rome either in 244 or 326. According to Professor Mauricio Saavedra OSA, "this group was introduced by Baronius and is fictitious."

The old Roman and British Martyrology places their deaths at Corinth.

They are commemorated in the Eastern Orthodox Church and the Roman Catholic Church on 28 May.

This Crescentius should not be confused with Crescentius of Rome, who died in 303; this Helladius is not the bishop and martyr commemorated on the same day.
