= Gerontius, Metropolitan of Moscow =

Russian bishop

Gerontius
- Metropolitan of Moscow and all Russia
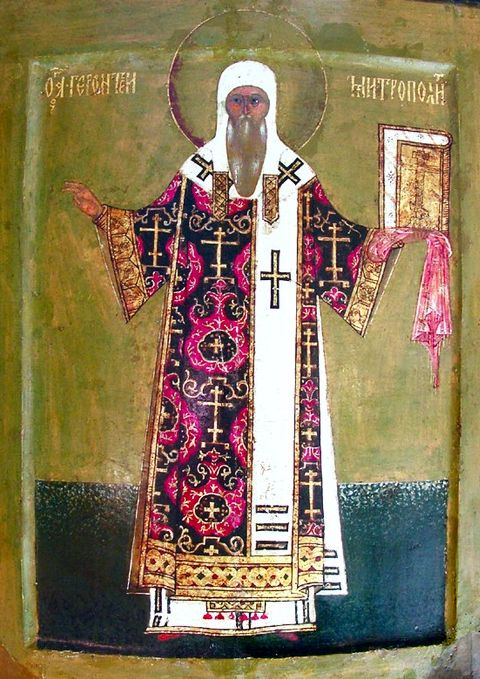
- Church: Russian Orthodox Church
- See: Moscow
- Installed: 1473
- Term ended: 1489
- Predecessor: Philip I
- Successor: Zosimus

Personal details
- Died: 28 May 1489

Gerontius (Russian: Геронтий; died 1489) was Metropolitan of Moscow and all Rus', the primate of the Russian Orthodox Church, from 1473 until 1489. He was the fourth metropolitan in Moscow to be appointed without the approval of the Ecumenical Patriarch of Constantinople as had been the norm.

== Biography ==
Gerontius was the Bishop of Kolomna. In 1473, he was appointed Metropolitan of Moscow. In the late 1470s, he was in conflict with Ivan III over, among other things, the consecration procedures of the new churches. During the Great standing on the Ugra river in 1480, Gerontius spoke for resisting the Golden Horde to the very end. He adhered to a moderate position in dealing with heresies, which had already plagued Moscow and Novgorod. In 1482, Gerontius left his post, though he would later return at the request of the Grand Prince. Gerontius died in 1489, and was buried in Dormition Cathedral, Moscow.

== Sources ==
- "Геронтий, митрополит московский" . Brockhaus and Efron Encyclopedic Dictionary (in Russian). 1906.

Eastern Orthodox Church titles
Preceded by Philip I	Metropolitan of Moscow and all Rus'; 1473–1489	Succeeded by Zosimus
