= Varlaam, Metropolitan of Moscow =

Metropolitan of Moscow from 1511 to 1521

Varlaam
- Metropolitan of Moscow and all Russia
- Church: Russian Orthodox Church
- See: Moscow
- Installed: 1511
- Term ended: 1521
- Predecessor: Simon
- Successor: Daniel

Personal details
- Born: 1441
- Died: 24 March 1533 (aged 91–92)

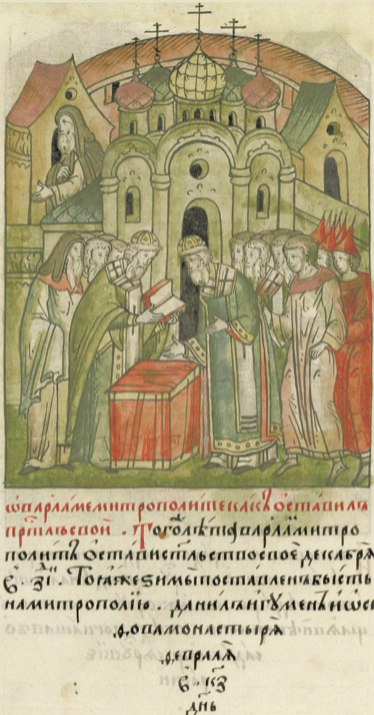

Varlaam (Russian: Варлаам; 1441–1533) was Metropolitan of Moscow and all Rus', the primate of the Russian Orthodox Church, from 1511 to 1521. He was the seventh metropolitan in Moscow to be appointed without the approval of the Ecumenical Patriarch of Constantinople as had been the norm.

== Biography ==
From 1506, he was archimandrite of the Simonov Monastery in Moscow. He was selected by Grand Prince Vasily III on July 27, 1511 and consecrated Metropolitan on August 3, 1511. He was said to be austere, never sycophantic to the grand prince, and never one to do anything against his own conscience. He was of the Non-possessors, those who opposed ecclesiastical land-ownership, although that group had been defeated at earlier church councils. He also protected Maximus the Greek, who was brought to Moscow to translate Greek texts.

In 1515, Varlaam consecrated the main church of the Khutyn Monastery just outside Novgorod the Great, with the archiepiscopal see being vacant from 1509. That same year, he consecrated the Tikhvin Monastery, also in the Novgorodian eparchy.

Vasily III wished to divorce his wife and remarry. The metropolitan opposed his wishes. As a result, the Grand Prince deposed Varlaam was removed from office on December 17, 1521. He was confined in shackles in the Kirillo-Belozersky Monastery north of Moscow. He was later moved to the Kamenny Monastery in Vologda where he died sometime in 1522.

Eastern Orthodox Church titles
Preceded by Simon	Metropolitan of Moscow and all Rus'; 1511–1521	Succeeded by Daniel
