= Photius (Metropolitan of Kiev and all Rus') =

- Metropolitan of Kiev and all Rus'
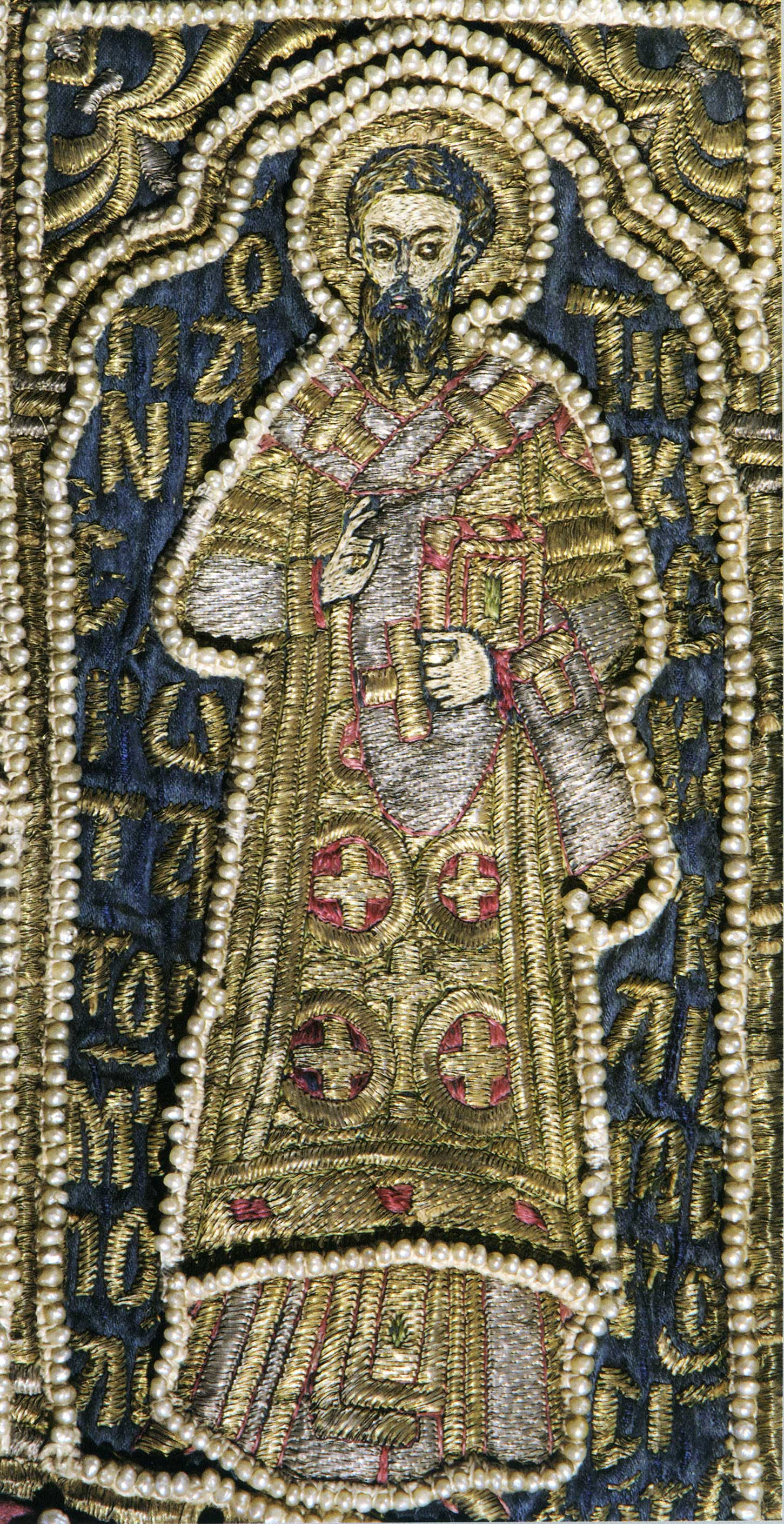
- Portrait from the Large Sakkos of Photius, c. 1417
- Native name: Φώτιος
- Church: Russian Orthodox Church
- See: Moscow
- Appointed: 1408
- Installed: 2 September 1408
- Term ended: 2 July 1431
- Predecessor: Cyprian
- Successor: Gerasim

Orders
- Ordination: 1408 by Matthew I of Constantinople
- Consecration: 2 September 1408 by Matthew I of Constantinople

Personal details
- Died: July 2, 1431 Moscow
- Buried: Dormition Cathedral, Moscow
- Denomination: Eastern Orthodox Church
- Residence: Moscow

Sainthood
- Feast day: 25 May, 27 May, 2 July, 15 July, 16 September, 5 October, 10 October
- Venerated in: Eastern Orthodox Church
- Title as Saint: Holy Hierarch, Metropolitan
- Canonized: 2009 by Patriarch Kirill of Moscow
- Shrines: Dormition Cathedral, Moscow

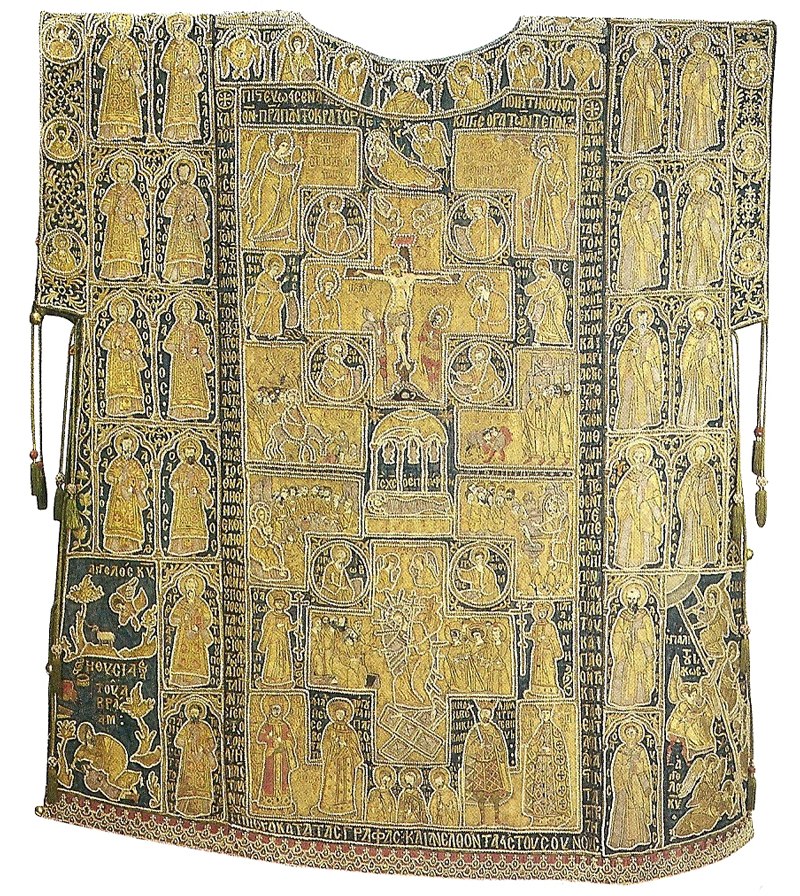
The Large Sakkos of Photius is a luxurious tunic gifted to Photius around 1417

Photius (Russian: Фо́тий, romanized: Fotiy; died July 2, 1431) was Metropolitan of Kiev and all Rus'. He was of Greek descent.

== Early life ==
Photius was born in the town of Monemvasia (Despotate of Morea, Byzantine Empire), located on an island near the southeastern tip of the Peloponnese peninsula. He became a monk in his youth. From 1397 he served with Metropolitan Akakios of Monemvasia.

== Career ==
On 1 September 1408, Patriarch Matthew I of Constantinople consecrated him in Constantinople as Metropolitan of Kiev and All Rus'. He was given the right to rule the whole metropolis excluding the metropolis of Galicia. By that time, only two of the five dioceses remained in Galicia. On 1 September 1409, Photius arrived in Kiev, and by Easter (April 22, 1410) – in Moscow.

Northeastern Rus', including the metropolitan region, was devastated by the invasion of Khan Edigu in 1408, resulting in famine and pestilence. Photius found his metropolitan residence ravaged and that the ecclesiastic treasury was empty. Everything seemed to be in chaos and he didn't know a single word of Russian. Photius made efforts to restore the church economy and the finances of the metropolis, turning to the grand prince of Moscow, Vasily I, for help. The metropolitan was concerned about the state of church discipline and morality. Numerous letters were written to him (mostly dated 1410–1420s).

In 1414, Vytautas, the grand Duke of Lithuania, attempted to re-establish the metropolis of Lithuania. He arranged for a synod of bishops to elect Gregory Tsamblak as the metropolitan of Lithuania. The consecration took place without the consent of Patriarch Euthymius II of Constantinople who deposed and anathematized him and who confirmed the same in letters to Photius, Emperor Manuel II Palaeologos and Grand Prince Vasily I. After Gregory’s death in the winter of 1419–1420, Photius made peace with Vytautas. As a result, the entire metropolis, including Halych, was unified under Photius until his death in 1431.

== Veneration ==
He was canonized in 2009 by including his name in the Synaxis of all saints of Moscow.

=== Feast Day ===
- 27 May – commemoration of uncovering and translation his relics in 1472 by Philip I, tenable, until the new Dormition Cathedral in Moscow was built in 1479 (He was moved with: Theognostus, Cyprian, Jonah)
- 2 July – commemoration of his death anniversary, the placing of the Honorable Robe of the Most Holy Theotokos at Blachernae
- 16 September – commemoration with Saint Cyprian, this celebration was included in the Menologium on November 22, 2017 with the blessing of Patriarch Kirill of Moscow

=== Fixed Feast Day (Synaxes) ===
- 25 May – Synaxis of Saints of Volhynia (ROCOR and Greek Orthodox Church)
- 15 July – Synaxis of All Saints of Kiev (ROC)
- 5 October – Synaxis of the Hierarchs of Moscow (ROC). He was added with Theognostus, Cyprian, Gerontius and Joasaph on March 6, 2017 with the blessing of Patriarch Kirill of Moscow.
- 10 October – Synaxis of Saints of Volhynia (ROC)

=== Moveable Feast Day (Synaxes) ===
- Synaxis of all saints of Moscow – movable holiday on the Sunday before 26 August (ROC)
- Synaxis of All Saints of Galicia – movable holiday on the 3rd Sunday of Pentecost [Eparchy of Lvov and Galicia, Ukrainian Orthodox Church (Moscow Patriarchate)]
- Synaxis of All Saints of Laconia – movable holiday on the 2nd Sunday of the Great Fast (Greek Orthodox Church)

== Liturgical hymns ==
Troparion St. Photios — Tone 4

Слове́с ева́нгельских послу́шателю/ и Боже́ственных уче́ний рачи́телю,/ прему́дрый наказа́телю,/ всегда́ стра́ху Госпо́дню поуча́яйся,/ в моли́твах к Бо́гу простира́яйся,/ загради́телю у́ст кривоглаго́лющим сло́во пра́выя ве́ры,/ апо́столом соприча́стниче,/ ве́ре Христо́вой утверди́телю,/ проро́чески веща́телю,/ святи́телю Фо́тие,/ моли́ Христа́ Бо́га/ умири́ти ми́р// и спасти́ ду́ши на́ша.

Sloves evangelskikh poslushatelyu/ i Bozhestvennykh ucheny rachitelyu,/ premudry nakazatelyu,/ vsegda strakhu Gospodnyu pouchayaysya,/ v molitvakh k Bogu prostirayaysya,/ zagraditelyu ust krivoglagolyushchim slovo pravyya very,/ apostolom soprichastniche,/ vere Khristovoy utverditelyu,/ prorocheski veshchatelyu,/ svyatitelyu Fotie,/ moli Khrista Boga/ umiriti mir// i spasti dushi nasha.

Kontakion St. Photios — Tone 8

Троице сосуд явися честный/ твоим житием, святителю Фотие,/ всегда зряй Святую Троицу, Ейже предстоиши,// молися всегда непрестанно о всех нас.

Troitse sosud yavisya chestnyy/ tvoim zhitiem, svyatitelyu Fotie,/ vsegda zryay Svyatuyu Troitsu, Yeyzhe predstoishi,// molisya vsegda neprestanno o vsekh nas.

== See also ==
- Large Sakkos of Photius
