= Philip I, Metropolitan of Moscow =

Metropolitan of Moscow from 1464 to 1473

Philip I
- Metropolitan of Moscow and all Russia
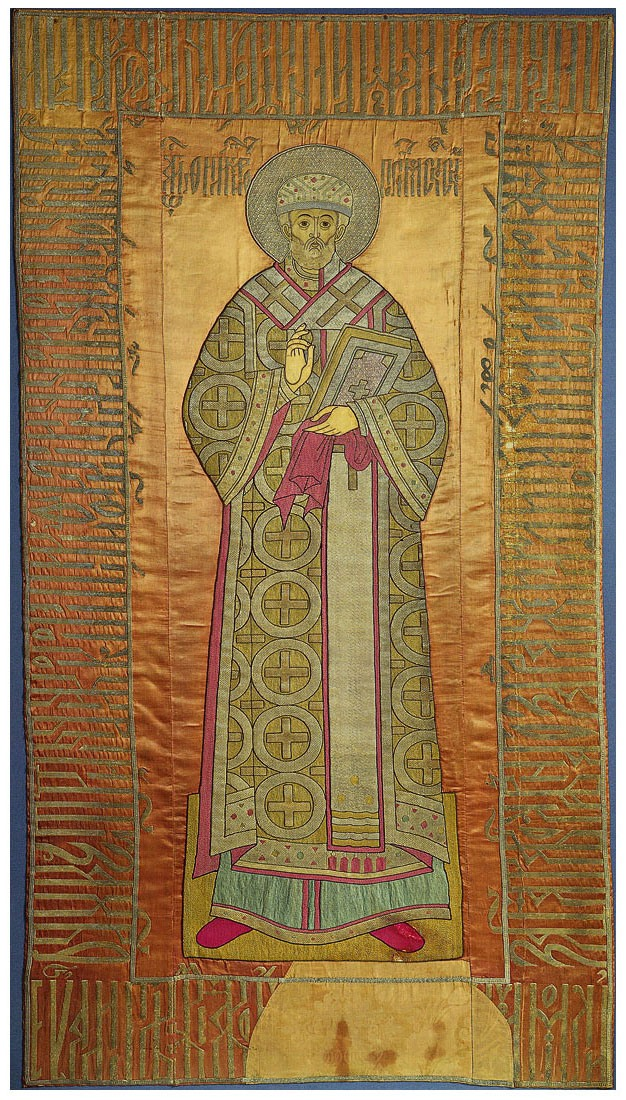
- Church: Russian Orthodox Church
- See: Moscow
- Installed: 1464
- Term ended: 1473
- Predecessor: Theodosius
- Successor: Gerontius

Personal details
- Born: 17 June 1402
- Died: 5 April 1473 (aged 70)

Philip I (Russian: Филипп I; died 1473) was Metropolitan of Moscow and all Rus', the primate of the Russian Orthodox Church, from 1464 to 1473. He was the third metropolitan in Moscow to be appointed without the approval of the Ecumenical Patriarch of Constantinople as had been the norm.

== Biography ==
According to Archimandrite Macarius (Veretennikov), he was born in the Byzantine Empire at the beginning of the 15th century. He served as a patriarchal clerk-official and lived in Constantinople. During his tonsure, he was named after the Philip the Apostle.

He arrived to Russia apparently after the death of Metropolitan Photius, after 1431. He stayed in Russia for a long time, became Russified, and the memory of his Greek origin was almost lost.

In 1464, he was appointed Metropolitan of Moscow, hand-picked by Theodosius at the time of his resignation, just as Theodosius had been picked by his predecessor, Iona

In the 1470s, Philip was actively engaged in a struggle against the Polish–Lithuanian influence over Novgorod, particularly the influence of the Metropolitan of Lithuania and the fear that Novgorod would defect to him and eventually go over to Catholicism.

While he was instrumental in bringing Sophia Paleologue from Rome to Moscow in 1472, Philip was against admitting a papal legate in her entourage into Moscow, thus continuing his opposition to Catholicism or "Latinism" in his province.

That same year, Philip started reconstructing the Cathedral of the Dormition in the Moscow Kremlin. The original cathedral, built by Metropolitan Peter of Moscow in 1326, was in a dilapidated state; Philipp hired inexperienced workers and soon after his death the building collapsed. It was rebuilt by Aristotile Fioravanti under Metropolitan Gerontius.

Metropolitan Philip died on 5 April 1473 and was buried in the Cathedral of the Dorimition in the Moscow Kremlin.

== Sources ==
- "Филипп I, российский митрополит" . Brockhaus and Efron Encyclopedic Dictionary (in Russian). 1906.

Preceded by Theodosius	Metropolitan of Moscow and all Rus'; 1464–1473	Succeeded by Gerontius
