= Helladius (4th century hieromartyr) =

Hieromartyr
- Died: 4th century
- Honored in: Eastern Orthodox Church
- Feast: may 27/28

Helladius or Helladios (Greek: Έλλάδιος) is a saint and hieromartyr (i.e. a martyred priest) in the Eastern Orthodox Church.

Almost nothing is known of his life or legend. It is said that he was a bishop who refused to deny his Christian faith; and that in consequence he was tortured, was thrown into the fire but miraculously survived; he was then savagely beaten to death. It is said that Christ visited him while he was in prison and healed his wounds. It is also said that he died during the Persian invasion of the Eastern Roman Empire in the 4th century AD.

His feast day is given as either 27 May or 28 May.
