= Feodorovskaya Church =

Church in St. Petersburg, Russia

Coordinates: 59°55′12″N 30°23′24″E

The Church of the Holy Prince Feodor of Novgorod Церковь святого благоверного князя Феодора Новгородского
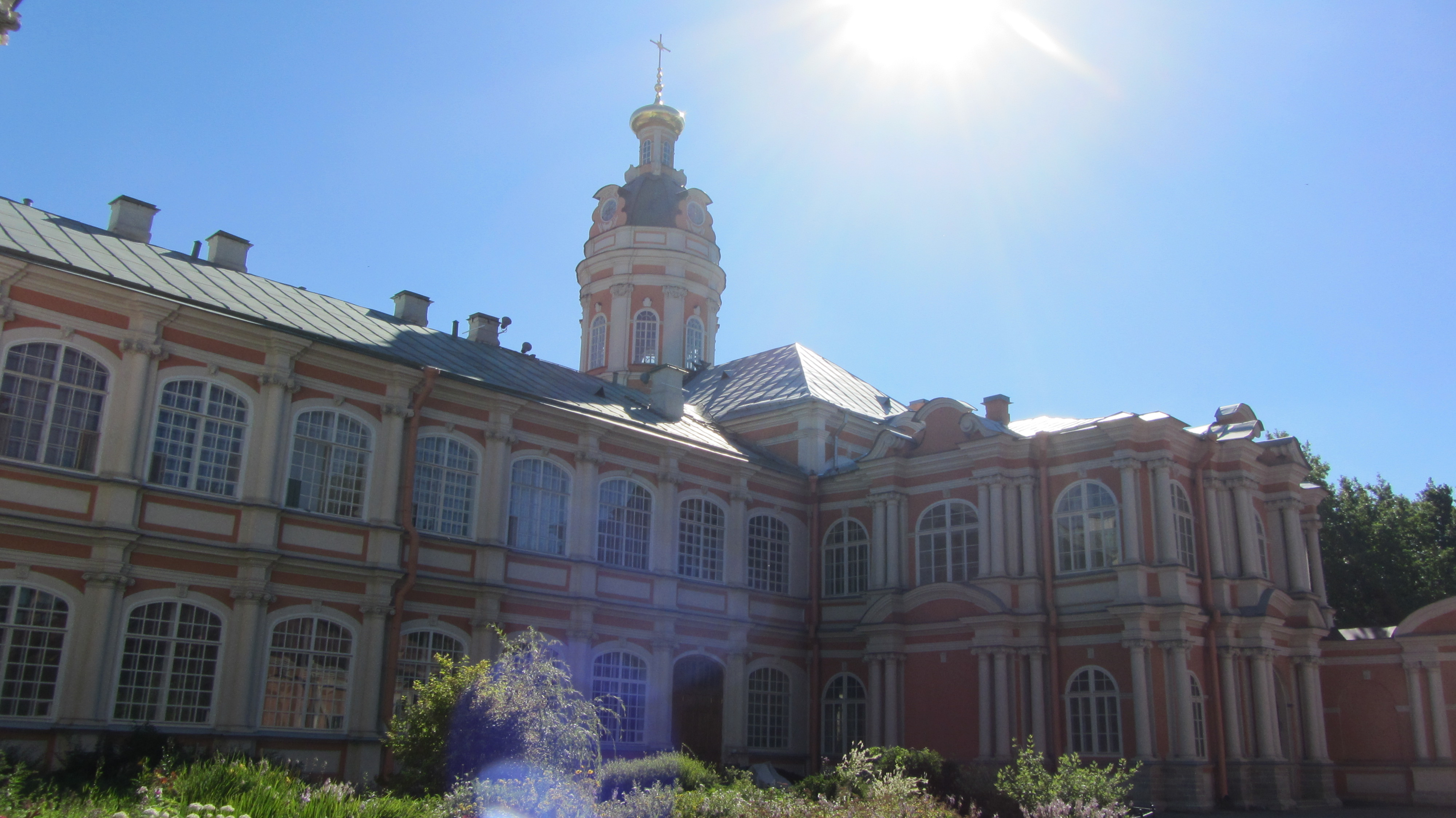

Religion
- Affiliation: Russian Orthodox

Location
- Location: Monastyrki Embankment 1, Saint Petersburg
- Interactive map of The Church of the Holy Prince Feodor of Novgorod; Церковь святого благоверного князя Феодора Новгородского

Architecture
- Architects: Leonard Theodor Schwertfeger; Pietro Antonio Trezzini
- Style: Petrine Baroque
- Groundbreaking: 1745
- Completed: 1770

Website
- www.lavra.spb.ru

The Feodorovskaya Church (Russian: Феодоровская церковь), or in full, the Church of the Holy Prince Feodor of Novgorod (Russian: Церковь святого благоверного князя Феодора Новгородского) is a Russian Orthodox church in Saint Petersburg. It is in the Diocese of Saint Petersburg and is part of the Alexander Nevsky Lavra.

The church was built as part of the southern extension from the Holy Trinity Cathedral, creating a symmetrical effect. The Feodorovskaya Church was designed as the counterpart to the Annunciation Church. Construction work began in 1745 and took a number of years. As completed the two-storey building hosted two churches, one on the upper floor, dedicated to Feodor of Yaroslav, and the ground floor dedicated to Saint John Chrysostom. After repairs in the 1840s the churches were re-consecrated. This time the upper church was dedicated to Feodor of Yaroslav, while the ground floor was dedicated to Saint Nicholas.

The church became a popular site for burials of leading churchmen, Georgian royalty, and other elite members of Saint Petersburg society. In 1891 an extension was opened, and also consecrated as a separate church, in the name of Saint Isidore of Pelusium. Over the next twenty-five years, around 150 burials took place. The churches were closed in 1931, during the Soviet period, and allocated to various organisations. The church served as a dormitory and office space. Almost all of the graves were destroyed during this period, with the exception of two that were transferred to one of the lavra's cemeteries. The church was returned to the monastery officials in 1996 and underwent a complex restoration, being re-consecrated in 2018.

== Design and construction ==
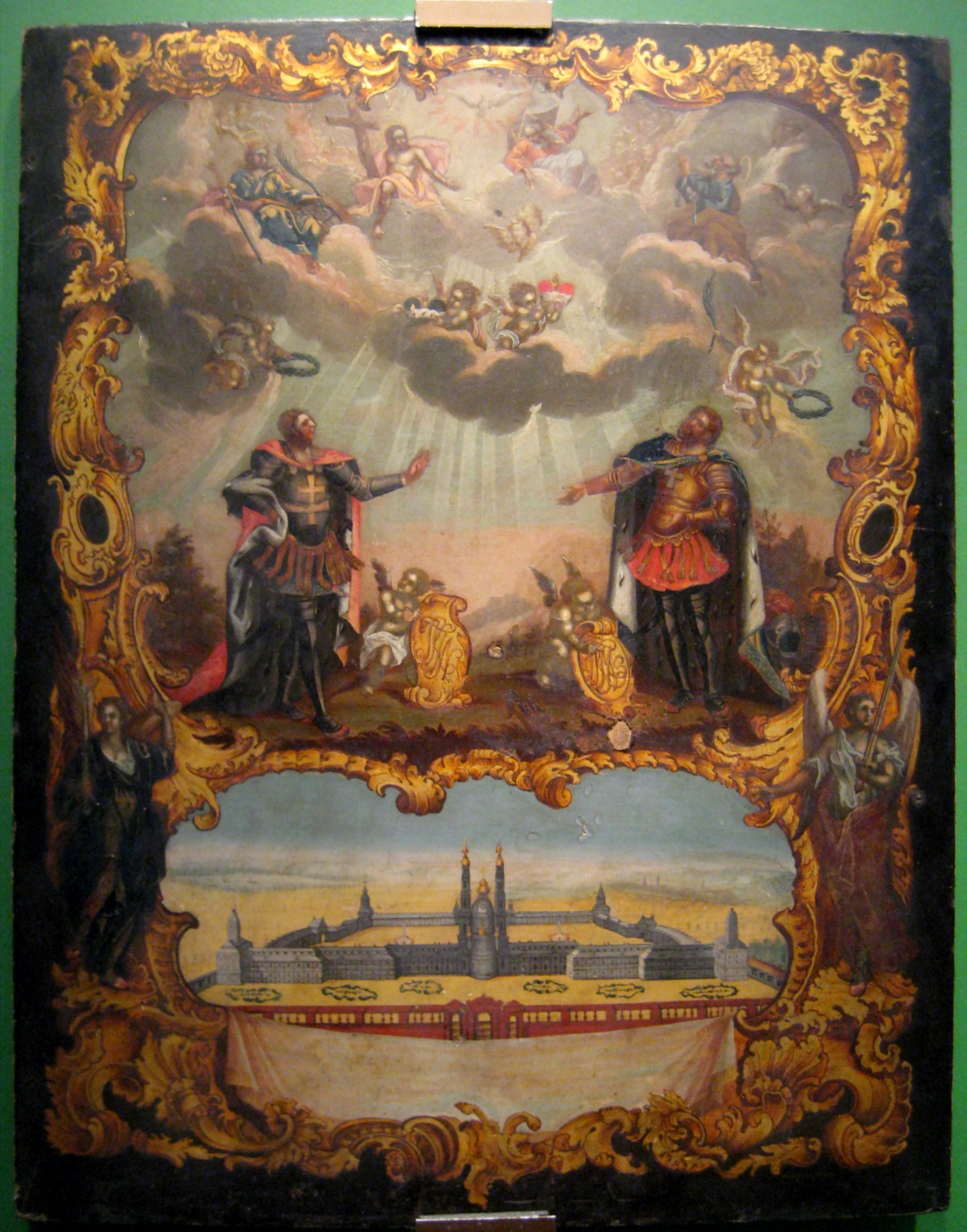
Icon, mid 18th century. Alexander Nevsky and his elder brother Feodor looking over the Alexander Nevsky Monastery. The Feodorovskaya Church was dedicated to Feodor.

Construction of the southern wing of the monastery building, from the Holy Trinity Cathedral to the southern boundary of the monastery, began in 1725, overseen by Leonard Theodor Schwertfeger. Construction stalled in 1730, and only resumed in 1741 under Pietro Antonio Trezzini. The two-storey wing was finally completed under the auspices of Ivan Rossi in 1748. The south-eastern corner continued the style of the north Dukhovsky wing, and like that wing, was finished with a two-storey church, laid down on 9 August 1745, and intended to be the symmetrical counterpart of the Annunciation Church. Construction of the church lasted for seven years, with further work to attach a staircase carried out between 1755 and 1761 by M. D. Rastorguev. The decoration was completed by 1766. As completed the church building contained two churches, one on the ground floor and one on the upper floor. The icons were painted by Aleksey Antropov. The churches were only consecrated in 1770; the upper one in the name of Holy Prince Feodor of Yaroslav, brother of Saint Alexander Nevsky; and the lower one in the name of Saint John Chrysostom.

In 1840, both churches underwent repairs. The iconostases were replaced, and new images by Dmitriy Antonelli were installed. The upper church was repainted and the painting “The Descent from the Cross” by Jacopo Bassano, originally in the private church of Grigory Orlov, was placed in it. The churches were then re-consecrated: the upper one on 11 June 1842 by Bishop Venedict of Revel in the name of Saint Nicholas, and the lower church on 17 September 1842 by Bishop Afanasiy of Vinnytsia in the name of Holy Prince Feodor of Yaroslav. In 1867 the iconostasis and the royal doors of the Feodorovskaya Church were again refurbished.

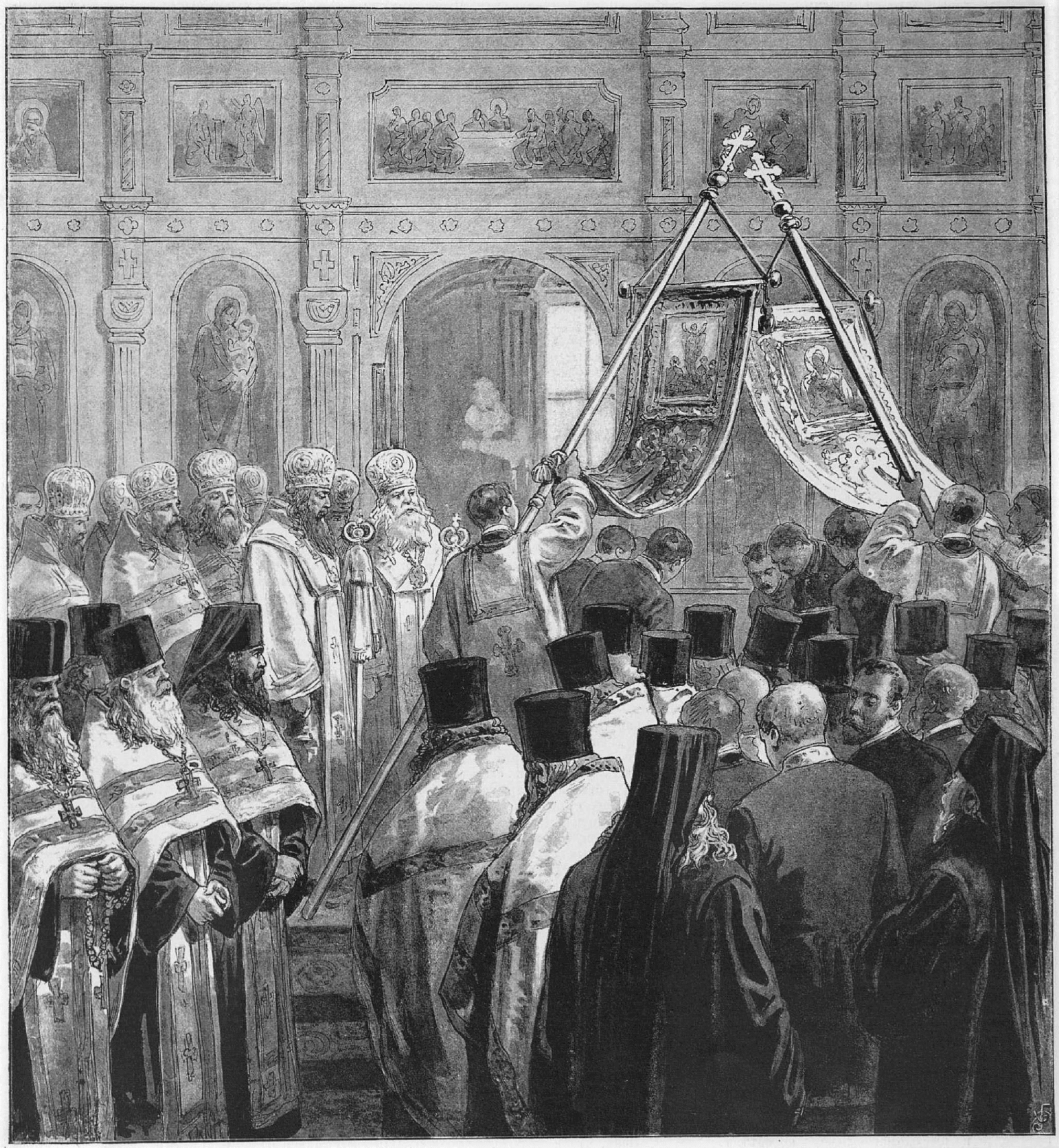
The funeral of Metropolitan Isidore in the Isidorskaya Church in 1892.

From 1806 the lower church was the site of burials of Georgian princes, and those of important members of Saint Petersburg society. In total around 100 burials took place in the Feodorovskaya Church, though none have survived. On 5 October 1889 the metropolitan approved a suggestion by the Spiritual Council to construct an extension to the church to allow further burials. This was built to a design by Grigory I. Karpov, and contained 167 spaces in its burial vault, with a two-tier iconostasis. On 6 October 1891 it was consecrated as a separate church in the name of Saint Isidore of Pelusium by Metropolitan Isidore. Over the 25 years of its operation some 150 burials took place, mostly those of bishops and church leaders.

== Soviet period ==
The churches remained open for a period after the Russian revolution, though they had ceased to function by December 1930. On 2 September 1931 the Feodorovskaya churches were ordered to be closed by order by the Presidium of Lensovet. The Isidorovskaya church closed three months later. The Feodorovskaya Church was transferred to the Volodarsky District Council, becoming a factory dormitory. The Isidorovskaya Church housed the Prometey Central Research Institute from 1931 to early 2000. The remains of Metropolitans Isidore and Palladiy were transferred to the Nikolskoe Cemetery, while the rest of the graves were destroyed.

== Post-Soviet developments ==
The Feodorovskaya Church and wing of the monastery were returned to the Orthodox Church in 1996. Novices from the monastery established metalworking, carpentry and jewelry workshops in the Feodorovskaya wing, supporting a major restoration of the church. On 18 June 2017, the feast day of Feodor of Yaroslav, the Bishop of Kronstadt Nazariy and the monastery monks performed the first prayer service after the church's restoration. The church was re-consecrated on 2 January 2018 in the name of Feodor of Yaroslav, and regular worship resumed. The grave of Yakov Rostovtsev, one of the architects of the Emancipation reform of 1861, was re-discovered in the lower church during restoration works.

== Burials ==
=== Feodorovskaya Church ===
Image	Name	Born	Died	Occupation	Reference
	Alexey Buturlin	1802	1863	Lieutenant general, Governor of Yaroslavl, senator	
	David	1767	1819	Georgian prince, writer and scholar, regent of the Kingdom of Kartli-Kakheti. Memorial plaque and epitaph to the Annunciation Church in 1930.	
	Mikhail Khomutov	1795	1864	Army officer, general. Ataman of the Don Cossacks.	
	Prince Mirian of Georgia	1767	1834	Georgian prince, son of King Heraclius II and Queen Darejan Dadiani. Army officer, major general, senator, translator, poet.	
	Yakov Rostovtsev	1803	1860	Army officer, general. Military education, cadet corps administration, Emancipation reform of 1861.	
	Sergei Stroganov	1794	1882	Statesman, art historian, archaeologist, collector, and philanthropist. Stroganov Moscow State Academy of Arts and Industry, Governor-General of Moscow.	
	Eugenios Voulgaris	1716	1806	Greek Orthodox cleric, author, educator, mathematician, astronomer, physicist, and philosopher.	

=== Isidorovskaya Church ===
Image	Name	Born	Died	Occupation	Reference
	Terty Filippov	1825	1899	Folklorist, singer, pedagogue, Honorary member of the Saint Petersburg Academy of Sciences, journalist, Orthodox Church official, Chairman of the Russian State Control committee.	
	Fyodor Geyden	1821	1900	Military commander, Governor-General of Finland.	
	Markell	1821 or 1825	1903	Russian Orthodox Church clergy, Bishop of Lublin, Bishop of Kamianets-Podilskyi, Bishop of Polotsk. Remains transferred to the Nikolskoe Cemetery in 1932.	
	Eugen Maximilianovich	1847	1901	Duke of Leuchtenberg. Army officer, division general, Russo-Turkish War, commander of the 37th Infantry Division.	
	Vladimir Meshchersky	1839	1914	Journalist and novelist. Grazhdanin.	
	Palladiy	1827	1898	Orthodox bishop, Metropolitan of St. Petersburg and Ladoga, member of the Holy Synod. Remains transferred to the Nikolskoe Cemetery in 1932.	
	Ivan Vyshnegradsky	1832	1895	Politician, Finance minister, member of the Council of Ministers of Public Instruction, member of the State Council.	
