= Alexander Nikolaevich Golitsyn =

Statesman of the Russian Empire

Alexander Golitsyn
- Александр Голицын
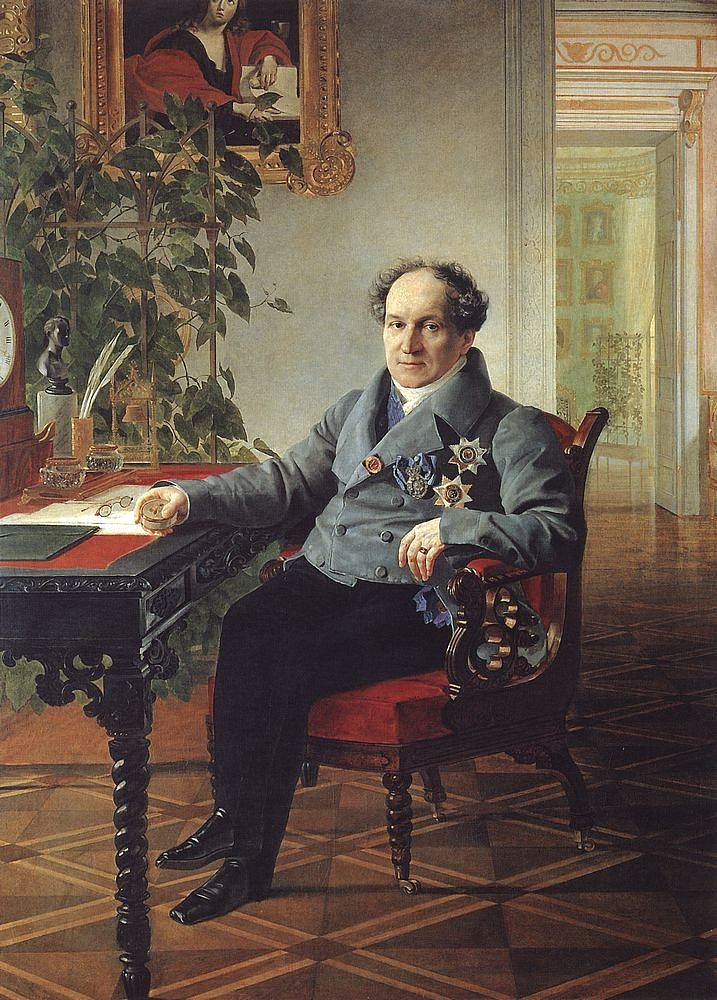
- Portrait of Alexander Golitsyn by Karl Bryullov

Chief of the Postal Department of the Russian Empire (until November 3, 1830 – as Part of the Ministry of the Interior)
- In office November 21, 1819 – April 8, 1842
- Preceded by: Office established
- Succeeded by: Vladimir Adlerberg

Minister of Spiritual Affairs and Public Education of the Russian Empire (until June 5, 1817 – Minister of Public Education)
- In office August 22, 1816 – May 27, 1824
- Preceded by: Alexey Razumovsky
- Succeeded by: Alexander Shishkov

Ober-Prosecutor of the Holy Governing Synod
- In office November 2, 1803 – August 31, 1817
- Preceded by: Alexander Yakovlev
- Succeeded by: Peter Meshchersky

Personal details
- Born: December 19, 1773 Moscow, Russian Empire
- Died: December 4, 1844 (aged 70) Gaspra Estate, Yalta County, Taurida Governorate, Russian Empire (Note: Now – the city district of Yalta (Yalta City Council) in the Crimea)
- Resting place: Balaklava Saint George Monastery
- Relatives: Golitsyns
- Awards: Order of Saint Anna; Order of Saint Andrew; Order of Saint Vladimir; Order of the Black Eagle; Order of the White Eagle; Order of Saint Stanislaus; Order of Saint Alexander Nevsky; Order of Saint John of Jerusalem

Prince Alexander Nikolayevich Golitsyn (December 19 [O.S. December 8], 1773 – December 8 [O.S. November 22], 1844) was a statesman of the Russian Empire. He served as Procurator of the Most Holy Synod from 1803 to 1816 and as Minister of Education from 1816 to 1824. He was a confidant of Alexander I, who until the end of his life treasured his "intimacy and advice".

== Origin and youth ==
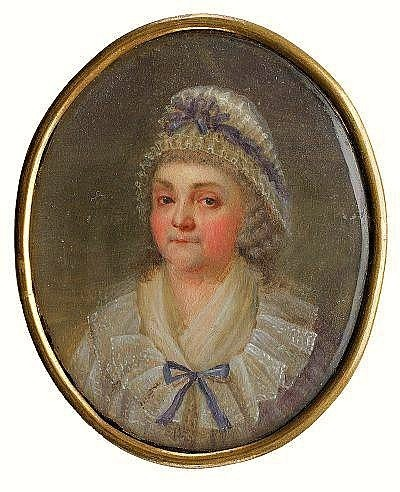
Mother of Prince Golitsyn

The only son of the captain of the guard, Prince Nikolai Sergeyevich Golitsyn (Alekseevich line), from his third marriage with Alexandra Alexandrovna Khitrovo (1736–1796), the grandson of the Moscow governor Sergei Alekseevich Golitsyn (1695–1758). Widowed two weeks after the birth of her son, the mother in 1776 married retired Major Mikhail Kologrivov. She treated her son strictly and coldly, but the influential court lady Marya Perekusikhina fell in love with the "funny and pungent" boy and, by order of Catherine II, in 1783 he was enrolled in the Page Corps moving from Moscow to Saint Petersburg.

The main focus was on teaching secular communication, French, fencing, dancing and horseback riding.

Thus, from infancy, Prince Golitsyn had access to the courtyard, where at first it was valued as a participant in the children's games of the Grand Dukes – Alexander and Constantine, and then – as a witty and clever gentleman. His brother (by father) Mikhail Golitsyn, who took the place of the Yaroslavl governor, built the estate of Karabikha (now a museum-reserve) under the city.

Another brother (by mother), Dmitry Kologrivov, accompanied the undersized prince Golitsyn in his mischief. Both brothers very skillfully imitated the manners and reprimand of others. Count Fyodor Tolstoy wrote:

Prince Golitsyn, brought up at court and only for the court. Having a sharp mind by nature, he was particularly distinguished by his ability to mimic and imitate the voices of others, so much so that in another room it was impossible not to be deceived and not to take him for the one whom he mimicked.

== Career ==
After graduating from the Page Corps in 1794, he was received as the lieutenant in the Preobrazhensky Regiment. But a year later he returned to the court and became a chamber junker of the small court of Grand Duke Alexander Pavlovich, and in 1796 he was transferred to the large imperial court. In 1799 he received the rank of chamberlain and in the same year became commander of the Order of Saint John of Jerusalem. He was expelled from Saint Petersburg by Emperor Paul I in the same year for an unknown reason.

After the accession to the throne of Alexander I, Prince Golitsyn, as a person close to him, was appointed first as "Procurator" of the I and later III Departments of the Senate, and then on October 21, 1803, at the insistence of the emperor, assumed the post of Procurator of the Holy Synod. In 1810, while maintaining his former position, he became the head of the foreign confessions, in 1816 – the Minister of Education.

Partly under the influence of Rodion Koshelev, this Epicurean and Volterian of Catherine's training, elected in 1806 as a member of the Russian Academy, turned to piety with a pronounced sentimental-mystical color. He easily undertook to explain to the emperor the most complex theological questions, although he knew the history of religion superficially and considered true Christianity "foggy sentimental pietism mixed with Orthodox dogmas, various heretical and sectarian teachings". Moscow Metropolitan Philaret recalled:

When the emperor appointed [Prince Alexander Golitsyn] as procurator, he said: "How can I be Procurator of the Synod? You know that I do not have faith". – "Well, complete, naughty, come to your senses". "When – said Golitsyn after – I saw that the members of the Synod were doing things seriously... and I became more serious, more respectful of the affairs of faith and the Church; when after a year or two I asked myself: do I believe? – I saw, that I believe, as I believed in childhood".

— From the Memoirs of Saint Philaret // Russian Archive – 1906 – No. 10 – Page 214

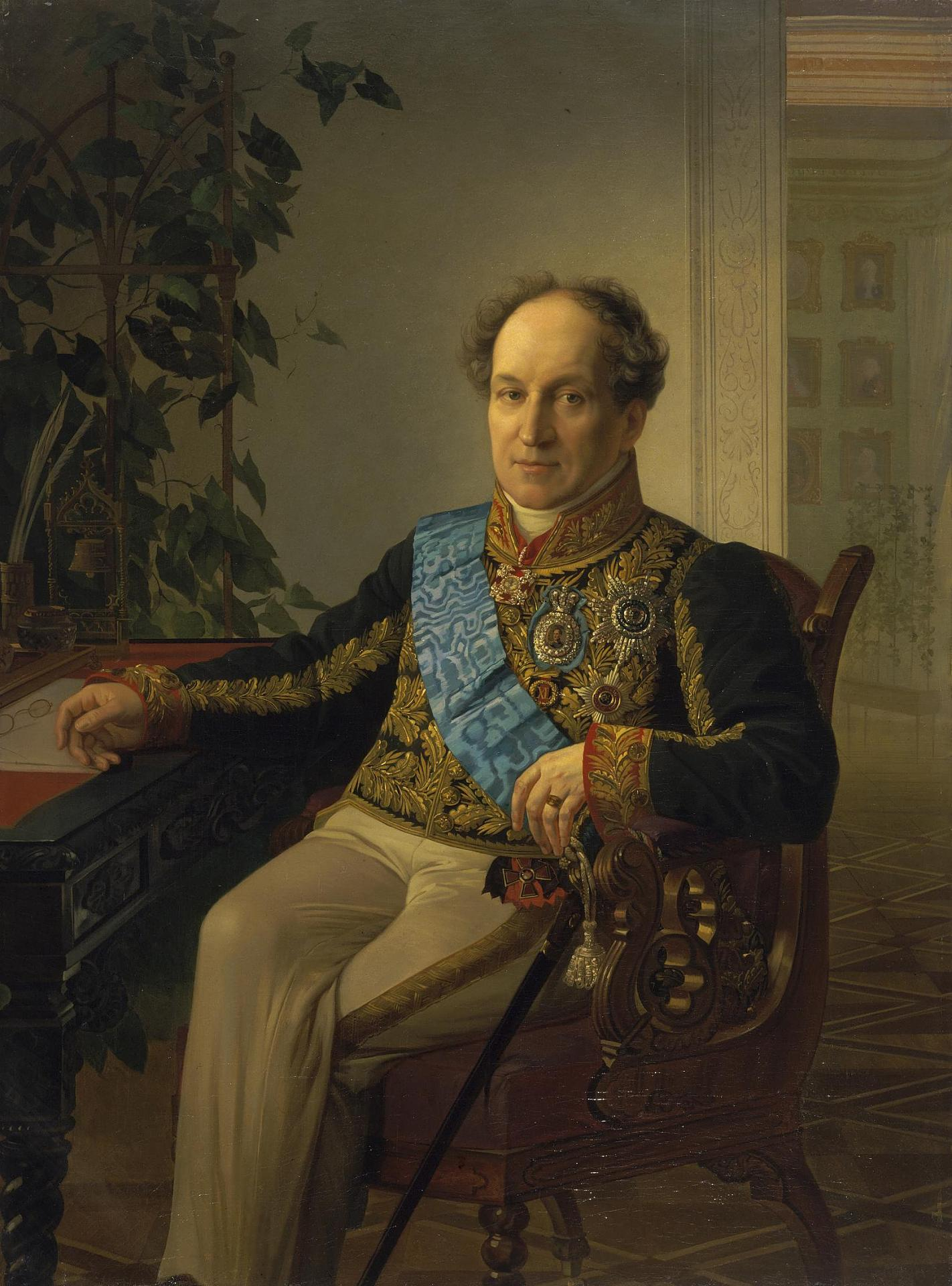
Egor Botman. Portrait of Prince Alexander Nikolayevich Golitsyn

Having proclaimed piety as the foundation of true enlightenment, Golitsyn headed for the clericalization of education, which under his leadership was zealously pursued by Mikhail Magnitsky and Dmitry Runich. He was suspicious of contemporary literature, which was expressed in the extreme censorship.

This "baby" in the work of faith was constantly fooled by various bigots and savages; he searched for the "outpouring of the Holy Spirit" and revelations, always chasing the prophets and prophetesses, for signs and wonders: either he "listened to the prophetic word" at the whip of Tatarinova, then he longed for the laying on of the hand of the new Chrysostom – Photius, then healed the possessed ones, then he was certified mystical ecstasy to experience the likeness of the Savior's suffering from the needles of a blackthorn.

— Grand Duke Nikolai Mikhailovich

After in 1817 the departments of spiritual affairs and public education were merged into one ministry – the Ministry of Spiritual Affairs and Public Education – Golitsyn became the head of the latter, but was relieved of the post of Procurator. Since 1810, Alexander Golitsyn was a member of the Council of State, and during 1839–1841 – Chairman of General Meetings. He was one of the few to whom the secret of the abdication of Konstantin Pavlovich was entrusted. He headed the Philanthropic Society, took part in the organization of the Guardians of Prisons Society and other philanthropic endeavors.

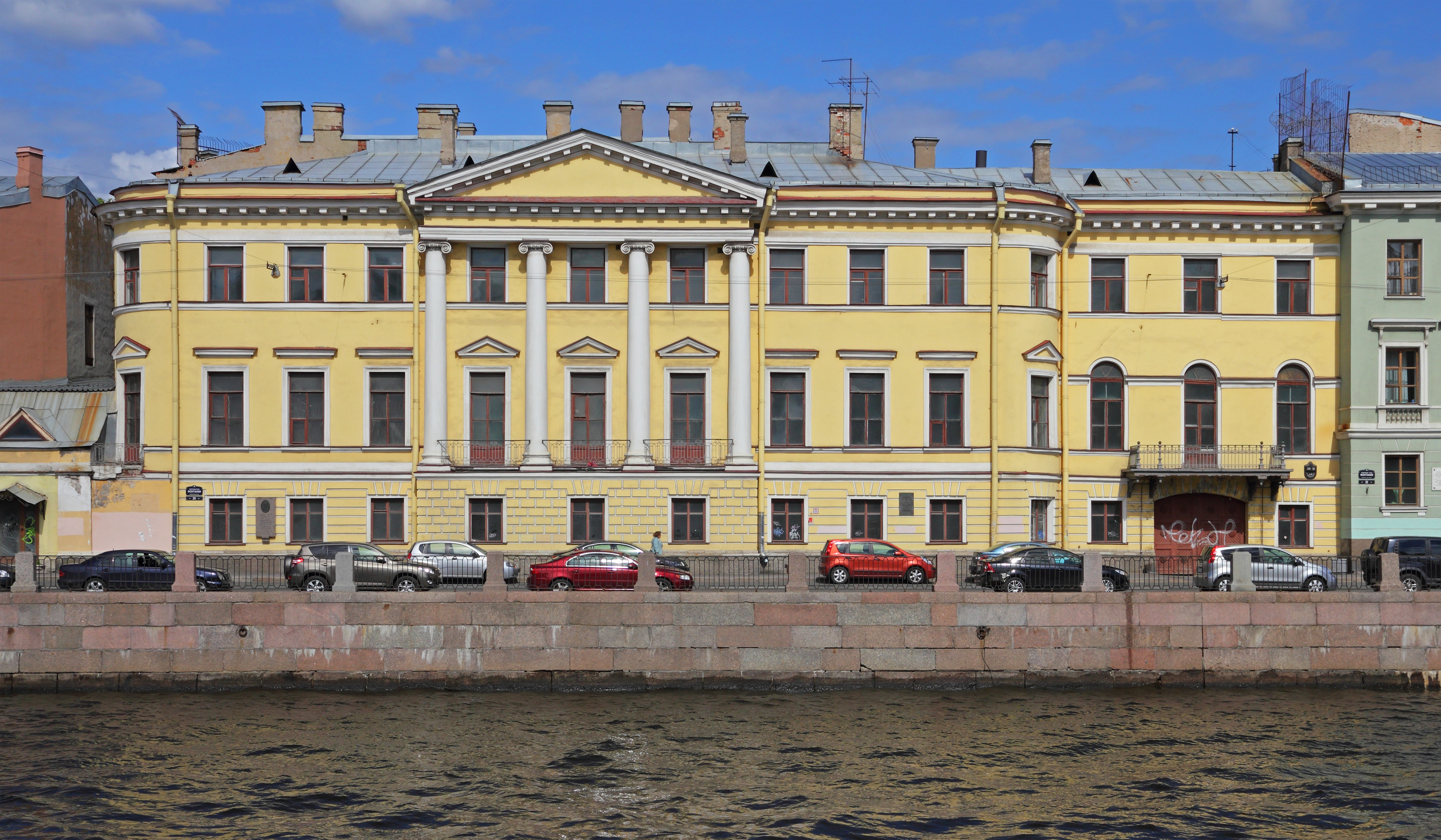
House of Prince Golitsyn on Fontanka, 20

In addition to the reform of theological schools, the establishment of the Russian Bible Society took place under Prince Golitsyn, which, under the presidency of the prince, translated the Bible into Russian and distributed more than 400,000 copies of it. The employees of this society, Popov, Magnitsky, Runich, and Cavelin, were appointed by Golitsyn to direct higher education, where they instilled clericalism; many professors were fired for lack of piety. Magnitsky demanded to completely close Kazan University ward to him. Although it was customary to associate the triumph of reaction with finding Golitsyn at the helm of the ministry, it was with him that the Saint Petersburg University and the Richelieu Lyceum were established.

On August 9, 1821, the Russian Emperor Alexander I established the Siberian Committee and Count Golitsin was included in its first composition.

To neutralize the influence of Alexander Golitsyn on the emperor, Aleksey Arakcheev led an intrigue under him with the participation of Metropolitan Seraphim and Archimandrite Photius, who convinced Alexander I that Golitsyn's administration was detrimental to the church and the state. His enemies triumphed on May 27, 1824, when Prince Golitsyn was to resign in both departments, retaining only the title of chief over the postal department. He held the last post under Nicholas I, who valued in Golitsyn "the most faithful friend of his family". Over the years, his religiosity only intensified. A contemporary recalls:

[In the home church of Alexander Nikolayevich there was] a semblance of a tomb, placed at the foot of a huge wooden cross; a shroud was laid on the coffin, various kinds of crosses were presented on this shroud, donated to the prince at different times. Instead of a chandelier, an image of a human heart is made of crimson glass before the coffin, and in this heart an unquenchable fire is burning. In this solitary closet, Emperor Alexander was beckoned with the prince and blessed memory.

In 1843, Count Golitsyn, due to visual impairment, left the capital and retired to Crimea, where he died in his estate of Gaspra. In the same Golitsyn Palace, Leo Tolstoy later wrote the novel "Hadji Murad". He was buried in the Balaklava Saint George Monastery.

== Personal life ==
Golitsyn spent his whole life a bachelor and was known for his intimate relationships with men. Nikolai Yazykov in a letter of 1824 cites an anecdote, "as if the sovereign had called for the famous sodomite Bantysh-Kamensky and ordered him to compile a list of all his acquaintances on this part, that Bantysh-Kamensky presented him with such a list, starting with the Minister of Education, then there was the chancellor and so on... After that he had an audience with the emperor and certified him oath in the truth of his report". Alexander Pushkin ridiculed Golitsyn in the epigram "Here is the Tail Protector...". The famous memoirist and homosexual Philip Vigel recalls Golitsyn even more biasedly: "Without blushing, you can't talk about him, I won't say anything more: I'm not going to stain these pages with his stupidity, his baseness and vices".

== Proceedings ==
Prince Alexander Golitsyn compiled for Empress Elizabeth Alekseevna "Opinion on the Difference Between the Eastern and Western Churches, with the History of Their Separation", which was published only in 1870.

== Encounter with Scottish Missionaries ==
On May 26, 1818, Dr Robert Ross MD, newly ordained minister representing the Edinburgh (later Scottish) Missionary Society, sailed from Leith with his new wife and other missionaries, Messrs Gray and Liddell and Mr and Mrs Macpherson for St Petersburg, Russia. Robert Ross’s commission was to go to the Kalmut (sic Kalmat) Tartars (sic Tatars), with the principal object being the translation of the Old Testament into the Tartar (sic) or Turkish language and the revising of the translation of the New Testament for a second edition. It was proposed to set up a printing press at Astrakhan for this purpose.

They arrived in Astrakhan on 14 February 1821. The ultimate objective of Dr Ross going to Astrakhan was the eventual sortie into the Crimean Peninsula to take the good news of the Gospel of Christ into this area.

A letter from Prince Galitzin (sic), Minister of State and Religion, and President of the Russian Bible Society, outlined their responsibilities and offered them full support and safe conduct, and also a letter of introduction to the Governor of the Crimea. In the Prince’s letter, he writes:

The object of your visiting the Crimea, being the establishment of an institution for the instruction of Tartar (sic) children and then goes on to say that in teaching these children, it would be necessary to have the voluntary permission of the parents and to take into consideration the local circumstances. Once all this was assessed, the Prince would put the whole idea to the Emperor.

Further in his letter he wrote:

A most important observation for you is to avoid on every occasion appearing ostensibly as Missionaries. This designation is never employed by an individual of foreign Religious Instructors in the Russian Empire, although their object may be to proclaim and promote Christian truth among those who belong not to the Christian religion.

He then goes on to ask as to what name they would call themselves and ends his letter with:

my earnest desire is that the Lord may be your Counsellor and Director in all your steps, so that thereby His name maybe glorified and the temporal and eternal interests of the Tartar (sic) Inhabitants of the Crimea Promoted.

As Prince Galitzin (sic) had given his approval for the Academy and the missionaries were under the security of the Russian Government, it was most necessary to adhere to the objects as laid down by the Prince in his letter. Dr Ross and the Rev. Glen and Mr Carruthers postponed their journey as long as they could, but they eventually arrived in Sympheropole (sic Simferopol) on 15 June 1821.

By August 1824, the Academy had not been established and Dr Ross had never returned to Crimea. He wrote from Astrakhan of change, as the missionaries were no longer received there, and the people did not accept the printed books and tracts any more. There was change in the Government and in St Petersburg, as Prince Galitzin (sic) was no longer Minister of State or President of the Bible Society. Other churchmen were sent out of the Empire and in June 1825, the missionaries were all in Moscow, and four weeks later they departed from St Petersburg and sailed for Leith.

== Awards and honors ==
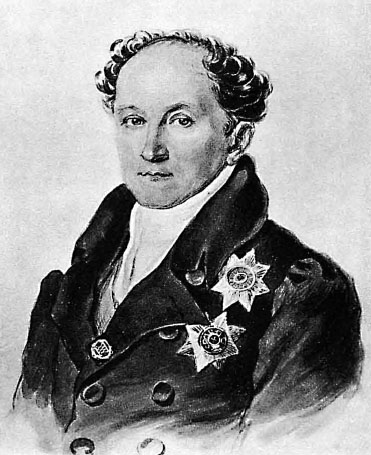
Watercolor portrait by Peter Sokolov

Russian

- 1799 – Order of Saint John of Jerusalem, Commander's Cross;
- 1804 — Order of Saint Anne, 1st Class;
- 1814 — Order of Saint Alexander Nevsky;
- 1826 — Order of Saint Vladimir, 1st Class;
- 1826 — Order of the Holy Apostle Andrew the First-Called;
- 1826 – Diamond to the Order of the Holy Apostle Andrew the First-Called;
- 1830 – Chancellor of Russian Orders;
- 1831 — Order of the White Eagle;
- 1831 — Order of Saint Stanislaus, 1st Class;
- 1834 – Portrait of the Emperor Sovereign with Diamonds;
- 1838 – Badge "For XL Years of Immaculate Service";
- 1842 – Pension According to the Order of the Holy Apostle Andrew the First-Called.

Foreign

- 1842 — Order of the Black Eagle (Prussia).

== Sources ==
- Fedorov. Golitsyn // Orthodox Encyclopedia – Moscow: Church and Scientific Center "Orthodox Encyclopedia", 2006 – Volume XI – Pages 695–697 – 752 pages – 39,000 copies – ISBN 5-89572-017-X
- Vladimir Sheremetevsky. Golitsyn Alexander Nikolaevich // Russian Biographical Dictionary: Gogol – Gune. Moscow, 1997. Pages 76–136. ISBN 5-7567-0079-X
- Yuri Bartenev. From the Notes of Yuri Bartenev. Stories of Prince Alexander Nikolayevich Golitsyn // Russian Archive, 1886 – Book 3 – Issue 6 – Pages 305–333
- Alexander Golitsyn. (Letters to Archimandrite Photius) / Publication and Сomments by Nikolai Barsov // Russian Antiquity, 1882 – Volume 33 – No. 3 – Pages 765–780 – Under the Title: Prince Alexander Golitsyn and Archimandrite Photius in 1822–1825
- Alexander Golitsyn. Two Letters of the Minister of Public Education, Prince Alexander Golitsyn, to the director of the Tsarsko-Rural Lyceum, Yegor Engelhart // Russian Archive, 1868 – 2nd edition – Moscow, 1869 – Columns 873–877
- Alexander Golitsyn. Letters from Prince Alexander Nikolayevich Golitsyn to Countess Anna Alekseevna Orlova-Chesmenskaya in 1822 and 1823 / Message by Ivan Zvegintsev // Russian Archive, 1869 – Issue 6 – Columns 943–958
- Alexander Golitsyn. Conversation of Napoleon I with Prince Alexander Golitsyn. 1808 / Written by Nikolai Kicheev // Russian Antiquity, 1874 – Volume 10 – No. 7 – Pages 621–622
- Yuri Kondakov. The Resignation of Prince Alexander Golitsyn on May 15, 1824 // Russia in the Nineteenth Century: Politics, Economics, Culture – Saint Petersburg, 1996
- Yuri Kondakov. The Personality and Government Activities of Prince Alexander Golitsyn // Personality and Power in the History of Russia in the 19th and 20th Centuries – Saint Petersburg, 1997
- Yuri Kondakov. Prince Alexander Golitsyn: Courtier, Official, Christian: Monograph – Saint Petersburg: ElekSis LLC, 2014 – 284 Pages
- Evgenia Nazarenko. Prince Alexander Golitsyn in the Socio-Political and Religious History of Russia in the First Half of the 19th Century: a Monograph – Voronezh: Publishing House of Voronezh State University, 2014 – 188 Pages
- Natalia Zazulina. Prince Alexander Golitsyn. Unknown in All Respects – Moscow: Boslen, 2019. 288 Pages. ISBN 978-5-91187-334-9
