= Vladimir Nikolaevich Lvov =

Russian and Soviet politician (b. 1872, d. 1930)

Vladimir Lvov
- Владимир Львов
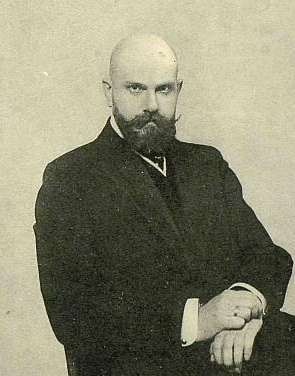
- Lvov in 1910

Ober-Prosecutor of the Most Holy Synod
- In office March 3, 1917 – July 24, 1917
- Preceded by: Nikolay Pavlovich Raev
- Succeeded by: Anton Vladimirovich Kartashov

Personal details
- Born: April 2, 1872 Saint Petersburg, Russian Empire
- Died: September 20, 1930 (aged 58) Tomsk, Russian SFSR, Soviet Union
- Political party: Union October 17
- Education: Faculty of History and Philology, Moscow University
- Occupation: Member of the State Duma of the Russian Empire of the III and IV convocations

Vladimir Nikolaevich Lvov (Russian: Влади́мир Никола́евич Львов; April 2, 1872 – September 20, 1930) was a Russian politician and statesman, member of the State Duma of the III and IV convocations. Ober-Prosecutor of the Most Holy Synod (1917; in the Provisional Government). Grandson of A. N. Lvov, brother of the politician N. N. Lvov.

== Early years ==
Born in a noble family Lvov. Father, Nikolai Aleksandrovich Lvov (1834–1887) – torzhok landowner; grandson of A.N. Lvov and count N.S. Mordvinov, son of N.A. Lvov. Mother – Maria Mikhailovna, née Chelischeva (29 [O.S. 1843] July – 1915).

He graduated from the private men's gymnasium Polivanov, faculty of history and philology Moscow University, was a volunteer at the Moscow Theological Academy. He had wanted to enter the monastery, but the famous old man Barnabas of Gethsemane (Merkulov), now canonized, did not bless him on the tonsure, but found him a bride and performed a wedding ceremony. In his youth he studied music, drew, wrote poetry (later became the author of the words and music of the hymn of the nobility of the Samara province "We carry the sword for the king").

== Public and political figure ==
He lived in the estate Krotkovo in the Buguruslan district of the Samara province (previously, the estate belonged to the wife, but she transferred the right to manage it to her husband). In 1907, he owned 360 acres of land, in 1912, it was already 4,608 tithes. In 1905 he participated in the creation "Union of October 17" in Samara and the Samara province. Elected vowel Buguruslanskogo district and the Samara provincial assembly. In 1907 – a member of the Samara provincial district council. Published in the newspaper "Voice of Samara."

In 1907 he was elected a member of the III State Duma of the total composition of electors in the Samara Governorate. In 1907–1910 – a member of the Union faction on October 17, then he was a member of the Russian national faction and a group of independent nationalists. Chairman of the commission for the Russian Church, he was also a member of commissions on punishment and religious issues, budget commission. He was known in the Duma as the 2nd Lvov (1st Lvov – his elder brother Nikolai).

In 1912 he was elected a member of the IV State Duma of the total composition of electors in the Samara province. He became chairman of the faction of the Center, retained the post of chairman of the commission on the affairs of the Russian Orthodox Church, he was also a member of the commission on religious issues, in Old Believer affairs, in the direction of legislative assumptions, on execution of the state list of incomes and expenses, budget and financial commissions. Evolved towards political opposition, in 1915 became a member of the Bureau of the Progressive Bloc. Criticized the situation in the management of the Russian Church, was opposed to the influence of Grigori Rasputin on the decision of synodal affairs, advocated the convening of a local council and reform of church government. In 1915, the opposition considered his candidacy for the post of chief prosecutor of the Holy Synod.

== Ober Prosecutor of the Synod ==
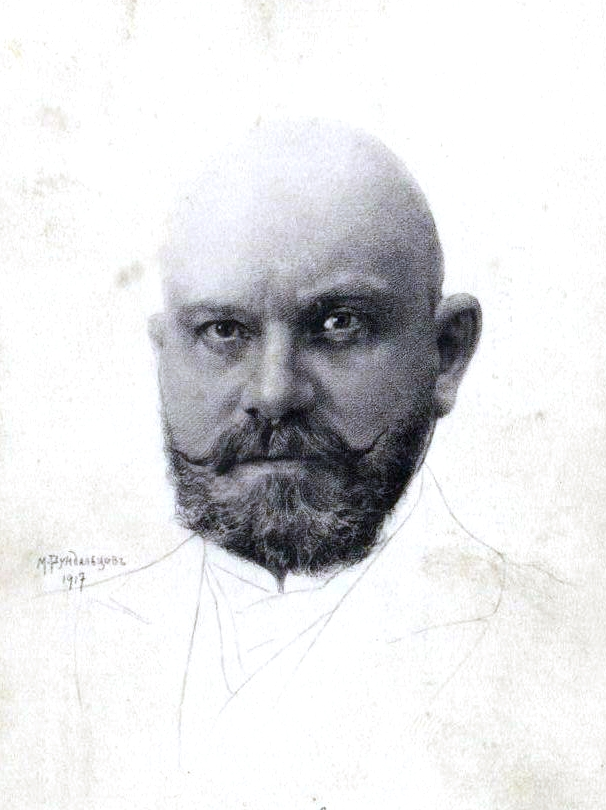
V.N. Lvov, 1917

During the February Revolution, he became a member of the Provisional Committee of the State Duma. He served as the chief procurator of the Holy Synod in the first and the second (first coalition) composition of the Provisional Government. Removed from the Synod of his former members: metropolitans of Petrograd Pitirim (Oknova) and Moscow Macarius (Nevsky), whom the press accused of having links with Rasputin. 14 (27) April 1917 initiated the publication of a decree of the Provisional Government on changing the composition of the Holy Synod, who left from his former members only the Archbishop Sergius (Stragorodsky). Actively supported the activities democratically and reformist clergy (in particular, on his initiative by the editor "All-Russian Church Public Herald" liberal professor Boris Titlinov was appointed) with his support, the All-Russian Diocesan Congress of representatives of the clergy and laity was held. Was a supporter of the convocation of the Local Council, considering that the majority of its participants will be supporters of reforms (this assumption was not justified).

His emotional nature, peculiar authoritarian management style displeased the majority of the representatives of the episcopate. According to Metropolitan Eulogius (Georgievsky), part of the Pre-Council Council, Lvov during his time as ober-prosecutor "He was a dictator and he overtook a lot of bishops", "made the business atmosphere of our meetings annoyed, hysterical tone, prejudiced ill will towards the bishops – he did not help the work, but interfered".

On July 8 (21), 1917, Lvov resigned, supporting the creation of a new government led by Alexander Kerensky, who, however, did not include him in his cabinet, preferring to appoint the chief prosecutor of a much more tactful and who knew how to find a common language with the hierarchy of professor Anton Kartashev. According to historian Nikita Sokolov,

Lvov was furious and directly told Foreign Minister Mikhail Tereshchenko that "Kerensky is now a mortal enemy for him." Lviv met then, amazed by the change that occurred in him. Vladimir Nikolayevich was so exalted that many seemed insane.

He was a member of the All-Russian Local Council (opened on August 15, 1917); but did not attend cathedral meetings.

== Lvov and the speech of General Kornilov ==
In August 1917, Lvov played an unclear role in the events, associated with the performance of general L. G. Kornilov. At first, he achieved a meeting with Kerensky, on which he offered to get in touch with a group of unnamed public figures, which has "real enough power", to provide his government with support on the right. Kerensky agreed to this. Then Lvov appeared in the rate of Kornilov and speaking as a representative of Kerensky (which did not give him any instructions), began to talk about the possibility of establishing the dictatorship of Kornilov with the approval of the Provisional Government. In response, Kornilov laid out to him his own terms for accepting dictatorial powers, which were previously discussed with the representative of Kerensky B.V. Savinkov (but without the participation of Lvov).

After that, Lvov arrived in Petrograd, where he met again with Kerensky, but already in the capacity of "truce" from Kornilov (which, again, this instruction did not give him), and presented an ultimatum to the prime minister "to transfer all power, military and civilian into the hands of the supreme commander". At the same time, he added his own assessment of the situation, declaring that Kerensky at the headquarters "everyone hates" and in the case of his appearance there "will surely be killed." All these actions of Lvov led to that Kerensky ordered his arrest as an accomplice of the "rebel" Kornilov, and the commander himself dismissed (the latter provoked the unsuccessful speech of Kornilov, his arrest and the resignation of the government).

There are different versions of the motives for Lvov's actions these days – from deliberate provocation to dislodge Kerensky to an unsuccessful attempt to return to big-time politics. According to Nikita Sokolov,

we will never know whether the Lvov demarche that followed at the end of August was a result of mental clouding or a cunningly conceived and masterly revenge, but its consequences were catastrophic.

For some time Lvov stayed in the Peter and Paul Fortress, and then was transferred under house arrest.

== Activities during the period of civil war and emigration ==
After the Bolsheviks came to power, Lvov secretly left Petrograd and went to Buguruslansky district of the Samara province, although he did not live long in Samara. The offensive of the Red Army forced the Lvov family to go to Siberia, where Vladimir Nikolaevich lived in Tomsk and Omsk, and moved away from political activity. At the end of 1919, the Lvovs had to be evacuated further east, and Lvov as a former member of the government, unlike other members of his family, refused to take the American Red Cross wagon. He managed to leave by mail train to Vladivostok, where he emigrated to Tokyo in 1920, and soon moved to France. His family settled in China, and he never saw them again.

At the end of 1920, Lvov delivered a speech in France demanding the Entente stop helping the white troops of general Peter Wrangel and stated that the support of Wrangel by the French government is illegal. In 1921, he joined the "Sverovekhovstvo", immigrant movement, advocated the refusal of the fight against the Soviet regime and cooperation with it. In November of the same year, he delivered a report in Paris on the topic "Soviet power in the struggle for Russian statehood", in which stated that only

The Soviet government is capable of fulfilling the demands of life, it alone is the bearer of the Russian state idea ... for all other authorities, claiming all-Russian significance, are crushed by the wheel of the revolution.

== Life in the USSR ==
In 1922, Lvov returned to the USSR, where he became manager of the renovation of the Higher Church Administration. Actively participated in the movement of the renovationists, lectured on the history of the church and the current situation in it, published articles in the Living Church. According to historians Anatoly Krasnov-Levitin and Vadim Shavrov, "the same noisy, blatant, self-confident, as he was, V.N. Lvov again begins to hang around the Eastern Orthodox Church, seeking to capitalize on the beginning of a split political capital".

In the autumn of 1924 he was dismissed from his post, but continued to lecture in various cities. He was involved in editing articles for the forthcoming edition of the "Revival and development of industry, trade and finance of the USSR".

G. M. Katkov writes in his fundamental research "The February Revolution":

Vladimir Lvov emigrated with the White Army and in 1920 he found himself in Paris; he published a series of wild articles on the Kornilov affair; publication stopped only after, how V. D. Nabokov appealed to the newspaper's editorial office with a protest about absurd nonsense, which Lviv offers readers. Shortly after the publication of articles, Lviv gave a lecture, in which he declared that the only government, protecting the great historical traditions of Russia, – this is the Soviet Government. Somewhat later, he returned to the USSR, joined the Union of Atheists and began writing anti-religious articles in newspapers

In February 1927, he was arrested along with other employees of the publishing cooperative "Iskra" on charges of "economic counterrevolution." By order of the board of the OGPU on April 29, 1927, he was exiled to Siberia for three years "with the remaining in one of the provincial cities." He served a link in Tomsk, was released in September 1929, but stayed in residence in this city. Then he was again arrested and died in the Tomsk Prison Hospital "from a decline in cardiac activity." A number of reference books claim, that he died in 1934, however, researchers of the history of the Lvov clan A. P. Lvov and I. A. Bochkareva with reference to the materials of the investigation file from the Central Archive of the FSB note, that his death certificate is dated September 20, 1930.

== Family ==
- He is married to Maria Alekseevna Tolstoy (1873–1941 or 1942), heir to the lands in the Buguruslan district of the Samara Governorate. His wife died in exile in Harbin. Children:
- Nikolay (1901–1942) – officer of the White (Kolchak) Army, was captured in 1920, until 1922 was in custody. Later he changed his name to Korzukhin, to hide your past. In 1933 exiled from Moscow to Torzhok, where he taught geography at a technical school, worked as a secretary in a law office. In 1941, mobilized into the Red Army, was in captivity. In December 1941 he was captured by Soviet partisans in the town of Zhizdra, accused of collaborating with German intelligence services, delivered by plane to Moscow. July 12, 1942, shot on charges of treason. Rehabilitated in 1998.
- Alexey, died in childhood.
- Vasiliy (1906–1985), in monasticism Nathanael – Archbishop of the Russian Orthodox Church Abroad.
- Gregory (1907–1941) – lived in China, died in Hong Kong.
- Ivan (1909–1938) – lived in emigration in China, taught English, opened his school. In 1935 his wife Nadezhda Anisimovna, born Boyko, returned to the USSR with her parents and her one-year-old son Leo. Ivan Vladimirovich followed her, taking the name Osipov. He taught English in Vladivostok, in 1937 he was arrested and shot down next year on espionage charges. Rehabilitated in 1963. His wife was also arrested and spent 10 years in the camp.
- Mary (1903–1986), the first marriage was married to the Tsarist officer Nikolai Meshcheryakov, the second – for Fedorov. She lived in emigration in China, then in the United States, where she died. Her son – Tomislav played basketball in the NBA for clubs Philadelphia / San Francisco Warriors and Seattle SuperSonics in the 1960s.

== Literature ==
- Lvov, Vladimir Nikolaevich // https://vivaldi.nlr.ru/bx000007844/details Edited by the Director of the Institute of Sciences N. M. *Dmitrienko. – 1st ed. – Tomsk: Publishing house NTL, 2004. – p. 194. – 440 p. – 3 000 copies – ISBN 5-89503-211-7.
- Lvova A.P., Bochkareva I.A. Rod of the Lvovs. – Torzhok, 2004.
- State Duma of the Russian Empire. 1906–1917. – M., 2006. – p. 351–352.
- 3rd convocation of the State Duma: portraits, biographies, autographs. – SPb .: publication N. N. Olshansko, 1910.

Preceded by Nikolay Raev	Ober-Prosecutor of the Holy Synod; 1917	Succeeded by Anton Kartashov

== See also ==
- Lvov princely family
- Lvov dvoryan families
