= Igor Gorynin =

Soviet metallurgist

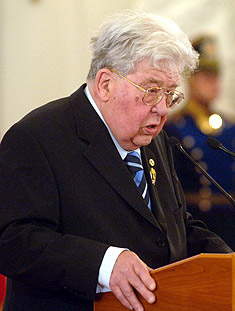
Igor Gorynin in 2006

Igor Vasilyevich Gorynin (Russian: Игорь Васильевич Горынин; 10 March 1926 – 9 May 2015) was a Soviet and Russian metallurgist, creator of many new titanium and aluminium alloys, and reactor steels. He was the director of the Prometey Central Scientific Research Institute Of Structural Materials.

== Biography ==
Igor Gorynin was born in Leningrad in 1926. He graduated from the Department of Metallurgy of the Leningrad Polytechnic Institute in 1949 After graduation he worked for a few months for the transformer plant in Zaporizhzhia (Zaporozhye Transformer Plant) then started to work for the Central Research Institute of Structural Materials Prometey. Since 1977 he has been the director of the Institute.

In 1957, he became a Candidate of Science for his works on plastic deformation on the properties for the high-strength steels for ship hulls.

In 1967, he became a Doctor of Science for his work on the construction materials for nuclear reactors. In 1971 he became a Professor, in 1979 he became a Corresponding Member of the Academy of Sciences of the Soviet Union and since 1984 a Full member of the Academy. In 1989 he was elected to Supreme Soviet of the Soviet Union (from the Academy of Science) and took part in the historic dissolution of the Soviet Union. He died at the age of 89 in Saint Petersburg in 2015.

== Works ==
Gorynin wrote on doping of metallic alloy and its effects on plastic deformations and physical properties of the alloys. These works allowed him to create a number of alloys with unique properties. Among the most important Gorynin materials are weldable titanium alloys for machine building and shipbuilding. He also created high-strength aluminum alloys. These alloys are claimed to have the highest specific strength of all known weldable metallic materials.

Gorynin invented of the radiation hardened steels used for nautical and stationary nuclear reactors and other compositional and functional materials with special requirements. He was a leader of the World Association of Materials Science. He is the member of the RAS Bureau of the Department of Chemistry and Science of Materials, member of the Presidium of St. Petersburg RAS Scientific Center, the Chairman of the RAS Coordination Council on the problems of the studies and creation of structural materials for the thermonuclear reactors, the Chairman of the RAS National Committee on welding, the President of the Interregional Union of Scientific and Engineering Public Associations, the member of the International Organizational Committee of the World Titanium Congress, etc.

== Awards ==
Igor Gorynin was awarded:

- two orders of the Red Banner of Labour (1959, 1970);
- Lenin Prize (1963);
- USSR State Prize (1974);
- Order of Lenin (1981);
- Order of the October Revolution (1986);
- State Prize of the Russian Federation (1994 and 2006);
- Order "For Merit to the Fatherland", 2nd (2002) and 3rd (1996) class;
- Order of Saint Daniil of Moscow (1996);
- La Crus de Comendator al Merito Belgo-Hispanico) (1997);
- Aleksey Krylov prize (2001);
- Dmitry Chernov's medal (2001)

== See also ==
- List of Russian inventors
