= Yuri Ozerov =

Yuri Ozerov may refer to:

- Yuri Ozerov (director) (1921–2001), Soviet film director
- Yuri Ozerov (basketball) (1928-2004), Soviet basketball player

== See also ==
- For other people with the same surname, see Ozerov
