= Ministry of Religious Affairs and Public Education =

Ministry of Religious Affairs and Public Education may refer to:

- Ministry of Religious Affairs and Public Education (Poland)
- Ministry of Religious Affairs and Public Education (Russia)
