= Alexander Volzhin =

Alexander Volzhin or Aleksandr Volzhin (Russian: Александр Волжин) may refer to:

- Alexander Nikolaevich Volzhin (1860–1933), Russian statesman and Chief Procurator of the Holy Synod
- Alexander Volzhin (chess player) (born 1971), Russian chess grandmaster

== See also ==
- Volzhin
