= Nikolai Pavlovich Raev =

Russian public figure and teacher

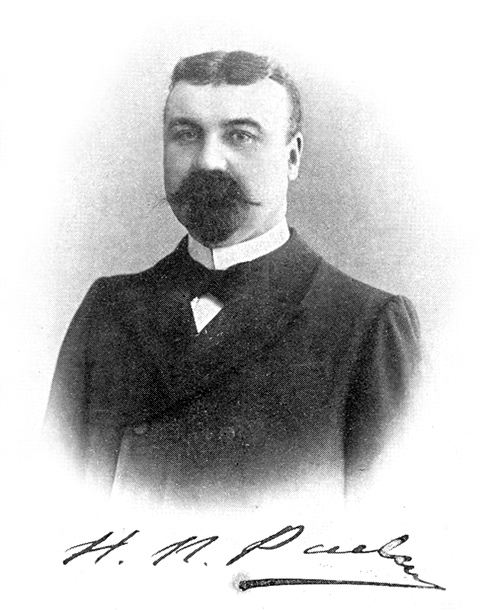

Ober-Procurator of the Most Holy Synod
- In office 30 August 1916 – 3 March 1917
- Preceded by: Alexander Nikolayevich Volzhin
- Succeeded by: Vladimir Nikolaevich Lvov

Personal details
- Born: 30 October 1855 Nizhny Novgorod, Russian Empire
- Died: 26 February 1919 (aged 63) Armavir
- Parent: Pavel Ivanovich Raev (father)
- Awards: Order of St. Vladimir 3rd class Order of St. Vladimir 2nd class Order of St. Anna 2nd class Order of St. Anna 1st class Order of Saint Stanislaus 1st class

Nikolai Pavlovich Raev (Russian: Николай Павлович Раев; 30 October [O.S. 18 October] 1855, Nizhny Novgorod – 26 February 1919, Armavir) was a Russian state and public figure and teacher. Active State Councillor (1896). The last Chief Procurator of the Most Holy Synod in the Russian Empire (from August 30, 1916 – until the fall of the monarchy in March 1917).

== Biography ==
He was born on October 18, 1855, in the family of archpriest Pavel Ivanovich Raev. In 1861 his father took monastic orders with the name of Palladium. In 1892–1898 Palladium was Metropolitan of St. Petersburg and Ladoga and the first member of the Holy Synod. He graduated from the gymnasium and in 1878, special classes of the Lazarev Institute of Oriental Languages.

On January 1, 1879, he was appointed to serve in the Moscow branch office with the rank of provincial secretary.

From September 1894, he served under the minister of National Education as an official for special assignments.

Raev received the rank of a state councilor on January 1, 1896, and was appointed a member of the Council of the Minister of Education on October 12, 1905.

On December 3, 1905, on his initiative, private higher women's courses of N. P. Raev, which were officially called "History and Literary and Legal Women's Courses". From 1906, the courses were called "St. Petersburg Free University of Women". Turned the courses into one of the best private women's universities, having selected an outstanding staff of teachers; among them – M.V. Bernatsky, V.D. Kuzmin-Karavaev, N.O. Lossky, I. Kh. Ozerov, L.I. Petrazhitsky, M.A. Reisner, S.V. Rozhdestvensky, S. M Seredonin, P.B. Struve, Baron M. Taube, S.L. Frank. For students of the Jewish faith, he achieved the right to live in the capital, and for all graduates in 1913 – equal to the graduates of universities the right to teach in the senior classes of female gymnasiums. Raev remained the director of the St. Petersburg Free University until August 30, 1916. The university itself existed until 1917.

Raev was dismissed from the post of Chief Procurator of the Holy Synod on August 7, 1916, by A.N. Volzhin (with appointment to the State Council), against which the Empress Alexandra Fyodorovna was set up. By decree to the Senate of the government on August 30 of the same year Raev was appointed to this post, who had a reputation as a Rasputin: he maintained personal relations with Grigori Rasputin and even visited him.

Protopresbyter of the army and navy Georgy Shavelsky in his posthumously published memoirs claimed:

All three candidates for the chief prosecutor's chair were faithful Rasputinists. The closest to Metropolitan Pitirim (Oknov) was Raev, because at one time the present metropolitan enjoyed the protection of his father, Metropolitan Palladius (Raev) of Petersburg, who nominated Pitirim when he was an archimandrite, to the post of rector of the St. Petersburg Theological Seminary. <...> In the Synod he was very simple, but he did not notice the "extraordinary" mind. Rather, in his mind, simplicity affected him. In relation to Metropolitan Pitirim, the new chief procurator kept too respectful, ingratiatingly

Shavelsky also noted that Raev had an ordinary mind and did not show much knowledge. In addition, the appearance of the new chief procurator was very comical: a bright, black-colored wig, painted with the same color mustache and beard, bruised cheeks and lacquered shoes: "He gave the impression of a youthful old man of indecent tone," "in the Synod, Raev was colorless, outside the Synod <...> ridiculous".

September 15, 1916 the highest decree to fulfill the post of comrade of the chief prosecutor was appointed Prince N.D. Zhevakhov, he also had a reputation as a "Rasputin" and friend of Metropolitan Pitirim of Petrograd.

On February 27, 1917, when in Petrograd the troops of the Moscow garrison crossed over to the side of the rebels, Raev, like the comrade of the chief procurator, Prince Zhevakhov, proposed to the Synod to publicly condemn the revolutionary movement, but this proposal was not supported by the members of the Synod.

After the fall of the monarchy in March 1917, he was dismissed on March 3. He was interrogated by the Extraordinary Investigation Commission of the Provisional Government, but was not arrested.

Under the Provisional Government, the cases of the Bezrodnovs and Baryatinskys began to be examined, as a result of which an investigation was opened against the former chief prosecutor, but he left for the Caucasus, and the October Revolution led to the liquidation of the investigative body of the provisional government.

He lived in the North Caucasus under the former Petrograd Metropolitan Pitirim (Oknov).

== Awards ==
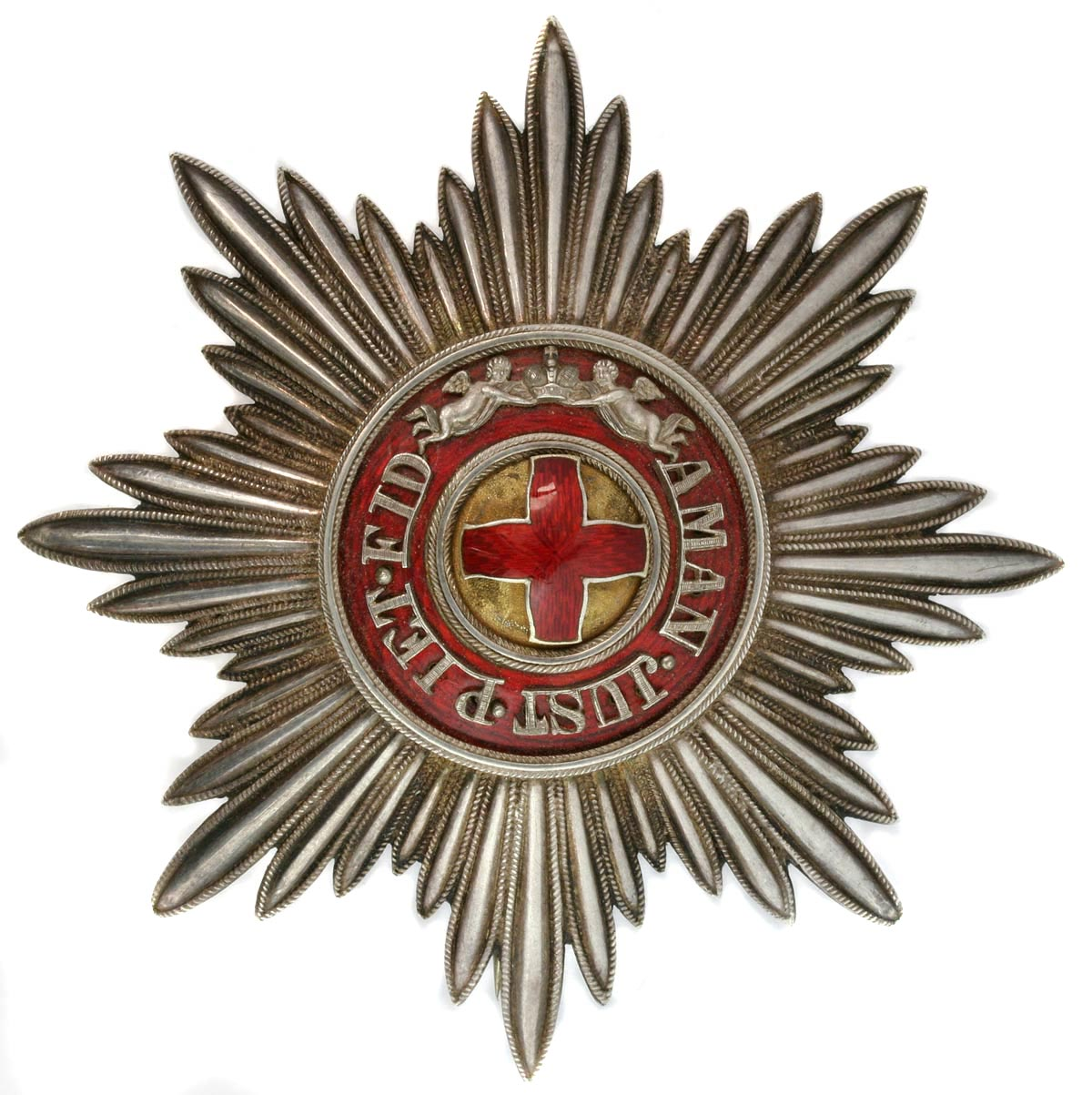
- Order of Saint Anna 2nd degree (1898)
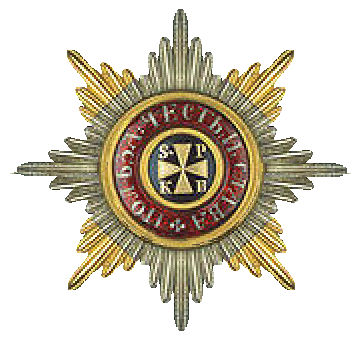
- Order of Saint Vladimir of the 3rd degree (1901)
- Order of St. Stanislaus 1st degree (1904)
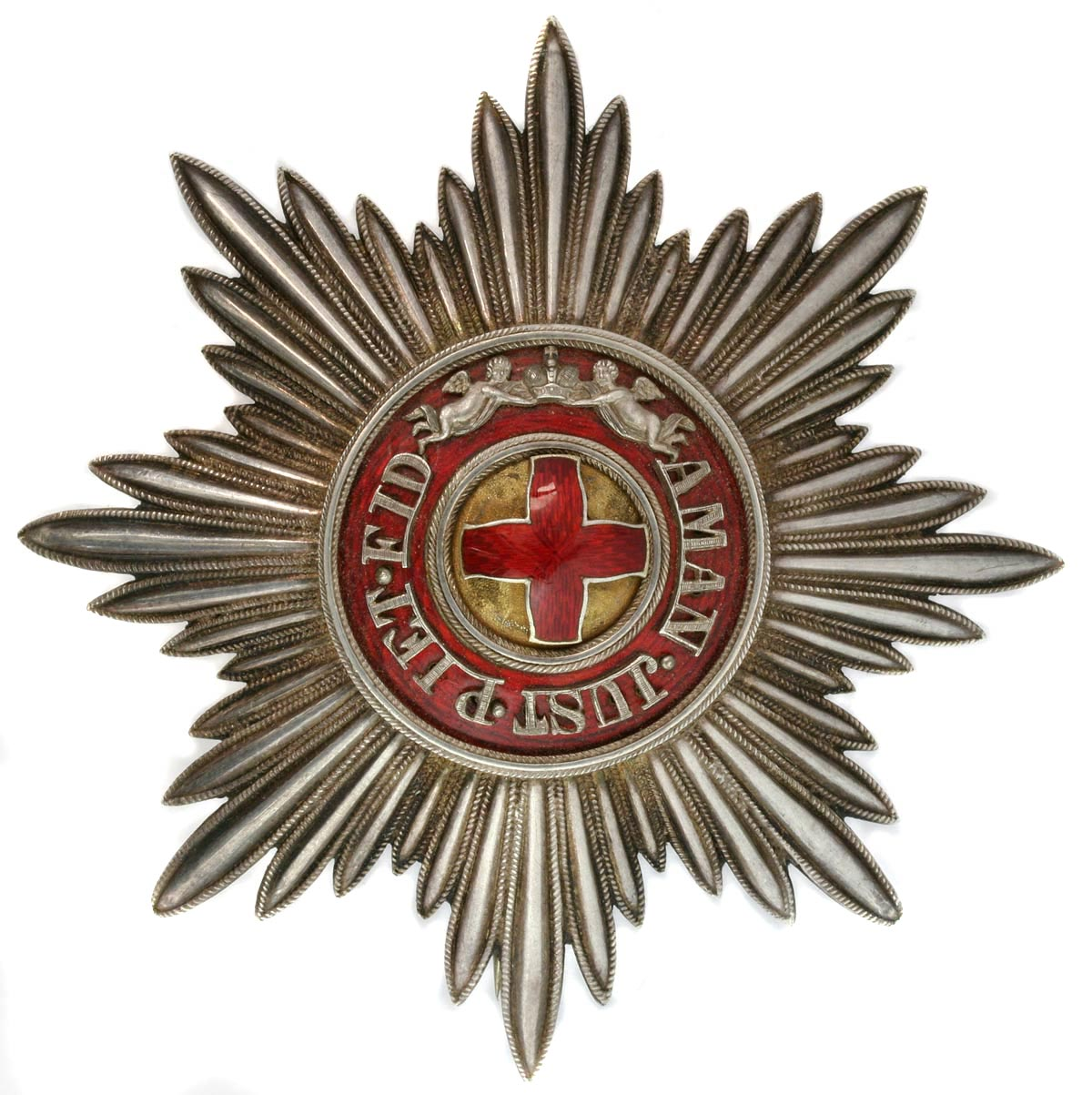
- Order of Saint Anna of the 1st degree (1908)
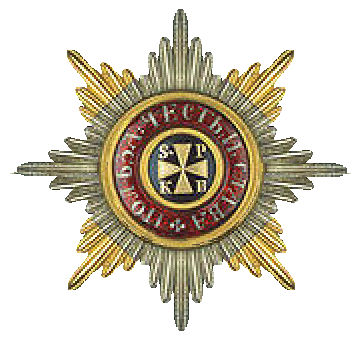
- Order of Saint Vladimir of the 2nd degree (1915)
- Medal "In memory of the reign of Emperor Alexander III"
- Medal "In memory of the coronation of Emperor Nicholas II"
- Medal "In commemoration of the 300th anniversary of the reign of the Romanov dynasty"

== Literature ==
- D.N. Shilov. Statesmen of the Russian Empire. Heads of higher and central institutions. 1802–1917. St. Petersburg, 2002, pp. 619–620.
- List of civilian ranks of the 4th class for 1907.
- List of civilian ranks of the 4th class for 1916.
