= Palladius (Rayev) =

Metropolitan Palladius Pavel Ivanovich Raev
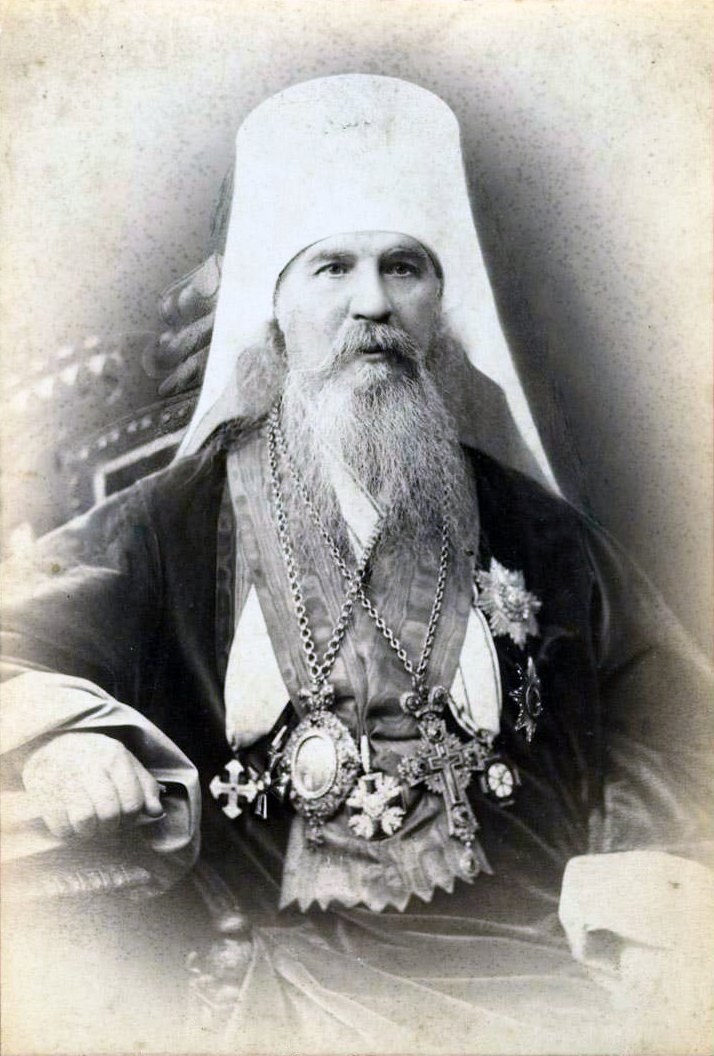
- Title: Metropolitan of St. Petersburg and Ladoga (October 18, 1892 – 5 December 1898), Archbishop of Kartali and Kakheti, Exarch of Georgia (29 September 1887 – 18 October 1892), Archbishop of Kazan and Sviazhsk (21 August 1882 – 29 September 1887), Archbishop of Ryazan and Zaraisk (9 September 1876 – 21 August 1882), Bishop Tambov and Shatsk (13 June 1873 – 9 September 1876), Bishop of Vologda and Ustyug (15 July 1869 – 13 June 1873), Bishop of Ladoga, Vicar of the St. Petersburg Diocese (18 December 1866 – 15 July 1869)

Personal life
- Born: Pavel Ivanovich Raev; 2 July 1827 village Peshelan, in the Nizhny Novgorod Governorate
- Died: 17 December 1898 (aged 71) St. Petersburg

Religious life
- Religion: Christianity

Metropolitan Palladius (secular name Pavel Ivanovich Rayev, Russian: Павел Иванович Раев, at birth his surname was Pisarev, Russian: Писарев; June 20 [O.S. July 2] 1827, village Peshalan, Arzamas county, Nizhny Novgorod Governorate – 5 December [O.S. 17 December] 1898, St. Petersburg) was bishop of the Russian Orthodox Church; 18 October 1892 until his death he served as Metropolitan of St. Petersburg and Ladoga, the first member of the Most Holy Synod.

== Biography ==
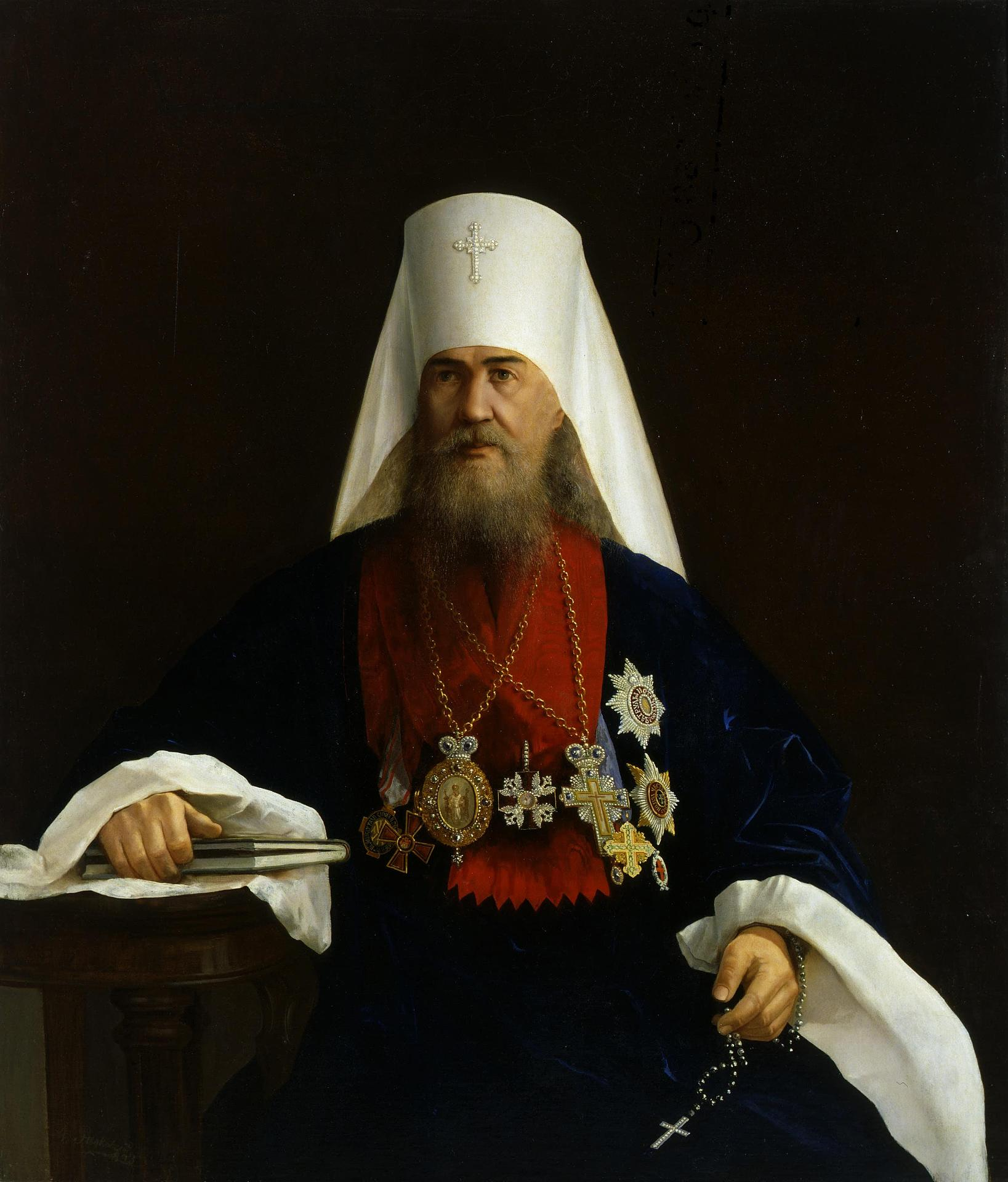
Portrait of Metropolitan Palladius, 1893

He was born into the family of the priest of the village of Peshelan of the Nizhny Novgorod diocese; studied at the Nizhny Novgorod Theological School and Nizhny Novgorod Theological Seminary (1848).

In 1852 he graduated from the Kazan Theological Academy with a master's degree in theology and was appointed a teacher of logic and psychology to the Nizhny Novgorod Theological Seminary, and a teacher of the Tatar language.

On 15 August 1856, he was ordained a priest to the church of the intercession of Nizhny Novgorod (not preserved).

In 1860, he was a widower, left with his children; 15 January 1861 took monastic vows with the name of Palladium in honor of the Monk Palladius, the desert of Antioch; 18 February 1862, was elevated to the rank of archimandrite.

Since 28 August 1863 – Inspector of the St. Petersburg Theological Seminary; from 2 December 1864 – rector of the St. Petersburg Theological Seminary.

18 December 1866 Metropolitan of St. Petersburg Isidore (Nikolsky) in the cathedral of the Alexander Nevsky Lavra khirotonisan in the bishop of Ladoga, the first vicar of the St. Petersburg diocese.

From 15 July 1869 – Bishop of Vologda and Ustyug.

Wanting to see the bell tower of St. Sophia Cathedral of Vologda, the most majestic and high in the diocese, pointed out to build a new cathedral bell tower on the site of the bell tower of the middle of the 17th century.

From 13 June 1873, Bishop Tambovsky and Shatsky.

Since 9 September 1876 – the Bishop of Ryazan and Zaraisk.

12 April 1881 was elevated to the rank of archbishop.

Since 21 August 1882 – Archbishop of Kazan and Sviyazhsky. In 1886, he founded Tsarevo-Kokshaiski Bogorodichno-Sergievsky female Cheremis monastery.

Since 29 September 1887 – Archbishop Kartalinsky and Kakheti, Exarch of Georgia.

In 1888 he was awarded a Diamond Cross for wearing on a klobuk.

The highest rescript of 18 October 1892 was appointed "to the pulpit of the reigning city of St. Petersburg, with the elevation to the rank of Metropolitan and the title of the first member of the Holy Synod". Arrived in St. Petersburg on 19 November of the same year.

Palladius preferred solemn, "festive" services with a large number of employees, stating that he liked them "in a magnificent setting – fussiness, running, talking".

On 14 May 1896, on the day of the holy coronation of Emperor Nicholas II and Empress Alexandra Feodorovna, whose commission he headed in the Assumption Cathedral of the Moscow Kremlin, he received a supreme rescript with a diamond cross for wearing at the mitre (as well as the metropolitans Joannicius (Rudnev) of Kiev Sergius (Lyapidevsky) and Moscow).

He managed to significantly expand the refectory of the Alexander Nevsky Lavra – after perestroika it turned into a spacious double-lighted hall with windows in two tiers, decorated with palace luxury. 23 March 1897 consecrated in her church of the Intercession and St. Palladium, located on the choir in the eastern part of the refectory.

Having fallen ill at the end of 1898, he blessed to perform the sacrament of anointing on himself, and, having communicated sacred secrets, on 5 December, at 2:40 am, quietly and peacefully died. The funeral services were headed by Archbishop Anthony (Vadkovsky) of Finland.

He was buried in the Isidorovskaya Church of the Alexander Nevsky Lavra (closed in 1932). The funeral dinner was given at the lavra's refectory from the two sons of the deceased. One of his sons – Nikolai Pavlovich Raev – later became the last Chief Procurator of the Most Holy Synod of Tsarist Time.

In 1932, his remains were transferred to the Brotherhood Cemetery of the Lavra.

== Published works ==
- «Признаки истинности православного христианства и лживости мухаммеданства» // «Миссионерский противомусульманский сборник». Вып. 9. — Казань, 1875.
- «Слова и речи». — Рязань, 1880.
- «Речь при вступлении в управление Казанской паствою» // «Православный собеседник». — 1882, ноябрь. — С. 191—204.
- «Речь новопоставленному иноку Александру Вадковскому, постриженному с именем Антония» // «Православный собеседник». — 1883, март. — С. 304—306.
- «Слово в день Благовещения Пресвятыя Богородицы» // «Православный собеседник». — 1883. — С. 1—8.
- «Слово в день святителей и чудотворцев Казанских Гурия, Варсонофия и Германа» // «Православный собеседник». — 1883, октябрь, с. 1-8.
- «Слово в неделю святых праотец» // «Православный собеседник». — 1883, декабрь, с. 1-6.
- «Речь перед дворянскими выборами 16 января 1884 года» // «Православный собеседник». — 1884, январь, с. 1-4.
- «Слово в день Сретения Господня» // «Православный собеседник». — 1884, февраль, с. 1-8.
- «Слово в день тысячелетия со дня блаженной кончины св. Равноапостольного Мефодия» // «Православный собеседник». — 1885, апрель, с. 337—343.
- «Слово по случаю столетнего юбилея со дня пожалования дворянской грамоты» // «Православный собеседник». — 1885, май, с. 1-3.
- «Слово в день явления Казанской иконы Божией Матери» // «Православный собеседник». — 1885, июль, с. 1.
- «Речь, произнесенная в Казанском соборе 23 июня 1887 г.» // «Православный собеседник». — 1887, июль, с. 251—252.
- «Речь по возвращении после присутствования в Свящ. Синоде, произнесенная 14 июня 1887 г.» // «Православный собеседник». — 1887, июль, с. 249—250.
- «Из поучений Высокопреосв. Палладия, Митрополита СПБ и Ладожского». «Народная Академия», кн. 1 Изд. С. Г. Рункевича. — Saint-Petersburg, 1895.
- «Доброе слово» // «Церковный вестник». — 1895. — № 47. — С. 1503.
- «Приветственная речь в Тифлисе» // «Прибавление к „Церковному вестнику“». — 1888. — № 41. — С. 1123.

== Literature ==
1. "The Church Herald", 10 December 1898, No. 50, stb. 1716–1722 (obituary).

== See also ==
- Palladium (Raev-Pisarev) On the site Russian Orthodoxy
- Archpastors of Kazan 1555—2011 on the site of the Kazan Theological Seminary
- Andreevsky Chevalier – Metropolitan of St. Petersburg and Novgorod Palladiy (Raev).
- Diocese of Vologda
