= Anton Kartashev =

Russian church historian (1875–1960)

Anton Vladimirovich Kartashev (Russian: Антон Владимирович Карташёв; 1875–1960) was a Russian professor of Church History and a journalist. Briefly in 1917, he was the last Ober-Procurator of the Most Holy Governing Synod of the Orthodox Church in Russia and Minister of Religion in the Russian Provisional Government; but from 1920 he taught in Paris.

== Biography ==
Anton Vladimirovich Kartashev was born in Russia on 11 July 1875 in Kyshtym in Perm Governorate in the Ural Mountains – the son of a government clerk and former miner. He was educated at a Church school in Ekaterinburg. In 1894 he earned a theological degree from Perm Seminary, and in 1899 from the St. Petersburg Spiritual Academy.

The following year he began his academic career, as a lecturer in Russian Church History at the St. Petersburg Spiritual Academy (1900–1905). He resigned this post in 1905 and briefly worked as an assistant librarian at the St Petersburg Imperial Public Library, but in 1906 he returned to lecturing, teaching the history of religion at St. Petersburg University College for Women (1906–1918). During this period he became chairperson of the Religious Philosophical Society in Petersburg (1909), and also edited the journal, Vestnik zhizni. On 25 March 1917 in the aftermath of the February Revolution Kartashev was named assistant to the Ober-procurator of the Holy Governing Synod of the Orthodox Church in Russia, Prince Vladimir Nikolaevich Lvov; he himself served as Ober-procurator from 25 July to 5 August 1917, when the office was abolished, and he then served as the first Minister of Religion until the October Revolution that year.

In 1918, Kartashev was arrested by the Communists. In January 1919 he fled Russia for Finland; and in 1920 settled in Paris.

In 1922, his book on 'Reform, Reformation and the Fulfilment of the Church' was published in Berlin. In Paris in 1924 he was instrumental, with several other emigre intellectuals, in founding the St. Sergius Orthodox Theological Institute, and from 1925 he was a professor there until his death. In 1932 he published his book, 'On the Way to the Ecumenical Council', and in 1944 the Institute awarded him a doctorate in theology.

After the second World War Kartashev published books titled The Biblical Criticism of the Old Testament (1947), The Restoration of Holy Russia (1956) and a History of the Russian Church (1959). Another book, on The ecumenical councils, was published posthumously in 1965.

He died on September 10, 1960, and is buried in the Sainte-Geneviève-des-Bois Russian Cemetery in Paris.
