= Alexander Yakovlev (1762) =

Russian politician

- Александр Яковлев
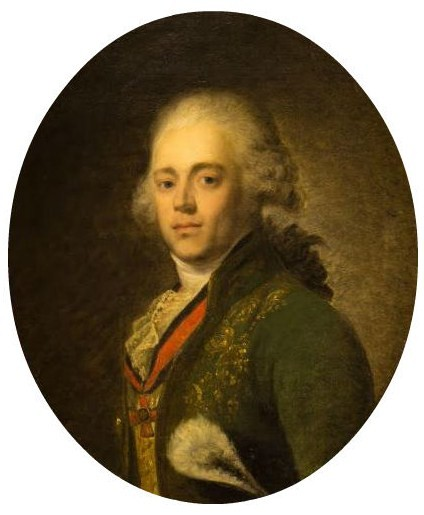

Chief Prosecutor of the Holy Synod
- In office December 31, 1802 – October 7, 1803
- Preceded by: Dmitry Khvostov
- Succeeded by: Alexander Golitsyn

Personal details
- Born: November 12, 1762
- Died: November 13, 1825 (aged 63)
- Resting place: Novo–Lazarevskoe Cemetery
- Relations: Yakovlevs
- Children: Natalia Zakharyina
- Parents: Alexey Yakovlev (father); Natalia Meshcherskaya (mother)

Alexander Alekseevich Yakovlev (November 12, 1762 – November 13, 1825) was a Privy Councillor, an actual Chamberlain, and a memoirist. In 1803, for nine months (from January 9 to October 1), he was the Chief Prosecutor of the Holy Synod. He was the father of Natalia Zakharyina, who married his nephew Herzen.

== Biography ==
He was the son of the Actual State Councillor Alexei Yakovlev (1726–1781) by marriage to Princess Natalya Meshcherskaya (1734–1781), brother of Senator Lev Yakovlev and retired Captain of the Guard Ivan Yakovlev, who was the father of Alexander Herzen.

Initially he served in the Collegium of Foreign Affairs. Herzen wrote about his uncle in the book My Past and Thoughts that "he received a decent education ... was very well–read ... served at some mission (as an advisor to one of the embassies), and when he returned to Saint Petersburg, he was made Chief Prosecutor".

The young, full of reformist plans, Emperor Alexander I needed an energetic person in the church department, which also expected changes. The choice fell on the forty–year–old Actual State Councillor Yakovlev, a scion of an old boyar family. His father served as president of the Collegium of Justice.

According to the professor of the Kazan Theological Academy, Peter Znamensky, the new Chief Prosecutor was "a very businesslike person, an ardent advocate of legality and state interest, like ... Shakhovskoy (Chief Prosecutor under Empress Elizabeth Petrovna) ... experienced and zealous".

The appointment of Yakovlev to the Synod of the Monarch was requested by his mother, Empress Maria Feodorovna.

He first of all drew attention to the shortcomings in the management of the synodal economy, which was outside the control of the Chief Prosecutor. With support in the person of Novosiltsev, Yakovlev received the sovereign's consent to expand his powers in this area. He strove for greater subordination to the secretaries of spiritual consistories. Being an adamant legalist, as the basis of his works in the Synod, he took the Ober–Prosecutor's Instruction, approved even under Peter I, and the Spiritual Regulations published at the same time, by which he set against himself the hierarchs "present" in the Synod, especially Metropolitan Ambrose (Podobedov) of Saint Petersburg, who was considered "first present".

This aroused the wrath of the hierarchs, along with Yakovlev's interest in spending the sums of the Synod. Like the Chief Prosecutor Khovansky, he took up the problem of the annual balance of church money, which was a huge amount at that time – about 100 thousand rubles. The interest is understandable: unaccounted for money, perhaps, could easily go into the pockets of the hierarchs. But his report to the emperor remained unanswered: Senator Troshchinsky helped the hierarchs, with the help of which Podobedov intrigued against the Chief Prosecutor. An important concern was the synodal printing house, which was managed by Podobedov's nephew.

Yakovlev noted that there were great abuses in the bidding for paper and other printing materials. The printing house had a large turnover with the general underdevelopment of the printing industry in the country. Through Novosiltsev, he achieved an imperial decree that the auctions were under the control of the Chief Prosecutor, which stopped the abuse. But relations with Metropolitan Ambrose and other members of the Synod worsened, which began to worry the Emperor Alexander I. "Yakovlev is not quite good...", he said to Prince Golitsyn, "the clergy are completely dissatisfied with them; complaints against him are incessant, and it seems to me that he is incapable of being in the place of the synodal Chief Prosecutor". Yakovlev, sensing the fragility of his position, asked for dismissal from his post.

"The debater has been dismissed", Yevgeny (Bolkhovitinov), the future Metropolitan, noted with satisfaction, expressing the mood of those present. The Metropolitan of Moscow Filaret (Drozdov) accused the Chief Prosecutor of "lust for power, stubbornness and insolence". Nevertheless, Yakovlev managed to undermine the credibility of Metropolitan Ambrose (Podobedov) and the synodal hierarchs. Podobedov was summoned to the monarch, where he received "a lesson commensurate with his actions".

In the future, the line of Yakovlev prevailed, who clearly outlined: the church reform, begun by Peter I, had not yet been completed, and there was still little justice and legality in the Synod. The state was faced with two options: to introduce the laity into the synodal presence, as was established by Peter I, or to strengthen the institution of the Ober–Prosecutor's Office. The second option was implemented, and in the 19th century, starting with Alexander Golitsyn, the Chief Prosecutors became the real masters of the Synod.

Yakovlev died on November 13, 1825. He was buried at the cemetery of the Alexander Nevsky Lavra (Necropolis of Artists) next to his wife, Olympias Zotova (1775–1865), the daughter of a Chief Officer and one of his many mistresses. Yakovlev married her shortly before his death, on January 26, 1825. They got married in Saint Petersburg in Saint Isaac's Cathedral; the guarantor for the groom was Count Mikhail Miloradovich, and for the bride – Prince Alexander Golitsyn.

== Works ==
- Notes of Alexander Yakovlev, Who Was in 1803 the Chief Prosecutor of the Holy Synod. Moscow. 1915.
