= Ministry of Religious Affairs and Public Education (Russia) =

Government ministry of the Russian Empire (1817–1824)

The Ministry of Religious Affairs and Public Education was a short-lived government ministry of the Russian Empire, directing all educational and scientific institutions and the spiritual affairs of all faiths within Russia.

It was formed by decree of Alexander I of Russia on 24 May (5 June) 1817 by merging the Ministry of National Education, the "Chief Directorate of Religious Affairs of the Orthodox Faith" of the Most Holy Synod, and the Chief Directorate of Religious Affairs of Foreign (i.e. non-Orthodox) Faiths. This gave it its unofficial nicknames of the "double ministry" and the "twice as much ministry". It was disbanded in 1824 due to its significant duplication of Synod's functions.

In place of the ministry were restored all three previous institutions.

== Heads ==
- 1817 – 1824 Prince Alexander Golitsyn (previously ober-procurator of the Most Holy Synod)
