= Ozerov =

Ozerov (Russian: О́зеров) or Ozerova (Russian: О́зерова; feminine} is a Russian surname that derives from the word ozero (Russian: о́зеро), meaning lake.

== Notable people ==
Notable people with this surname include:

=== Men ===
- Lev Ozerov (1914–1996), Soviet poet
- Nikolai Ozerov (singer) (1887–1953), a Russian and Soviet opera singer and People's Artist of the USSR
- Nikolai Ozerov (1922–1997), Soviet tennis player and actor, who was best known as a leading sports commentator of the Soviet Union in the 1950s–80s
- Vitaly Ozerov (1917–2007), a Soviet literary critic
- Vladislav Ozerov (1769–1816), a Russian dramatist
- Vladislav Sergeyevich Ozerov (born 1995), Russian footballer
- Yuri Ozerov (director) (1921–2001), a Soviet film director and People's Artist of the USSR
- Yuri Ozerov (basketball) (1928–2004), a Soviet basketball player
- Ozerov Ivan Khristoforovich (1869–1942), Russian professor, financier, economist

=== Women ===
- Ksenia Ozerova (born 1991), a Russian pair skater
