= Lvov dvoryan families =

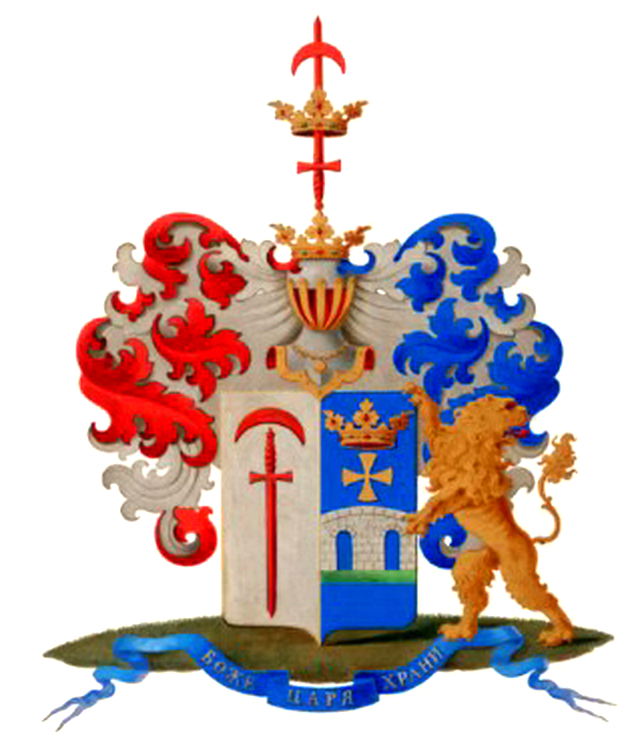
Coat of arms of Lvov noble family of Tver Guberniya

There were several dvoryan (Russian nobility) families named Lvov (Russian: Львов) in the Russian Empire.

One of them is traced from a Mark Demidovich of Lithuanian descent (14th century) and is enlisted into the pedigree book of Tver Guberniya.

Another one traces from the 16th century and enlisted into the pedigree books of Moscow and Oryol guberniyas.

Still another one descends from a Kondratiy Afanasiyevich Lvov granted an estate in Galich uyezd, Kostroma Guberniya in 1671. The family is enlisted into the pedigree book of Kostroma Guberniya.
