= Yakov Rostovtsev =

Russian general and reformer (1804–1860)

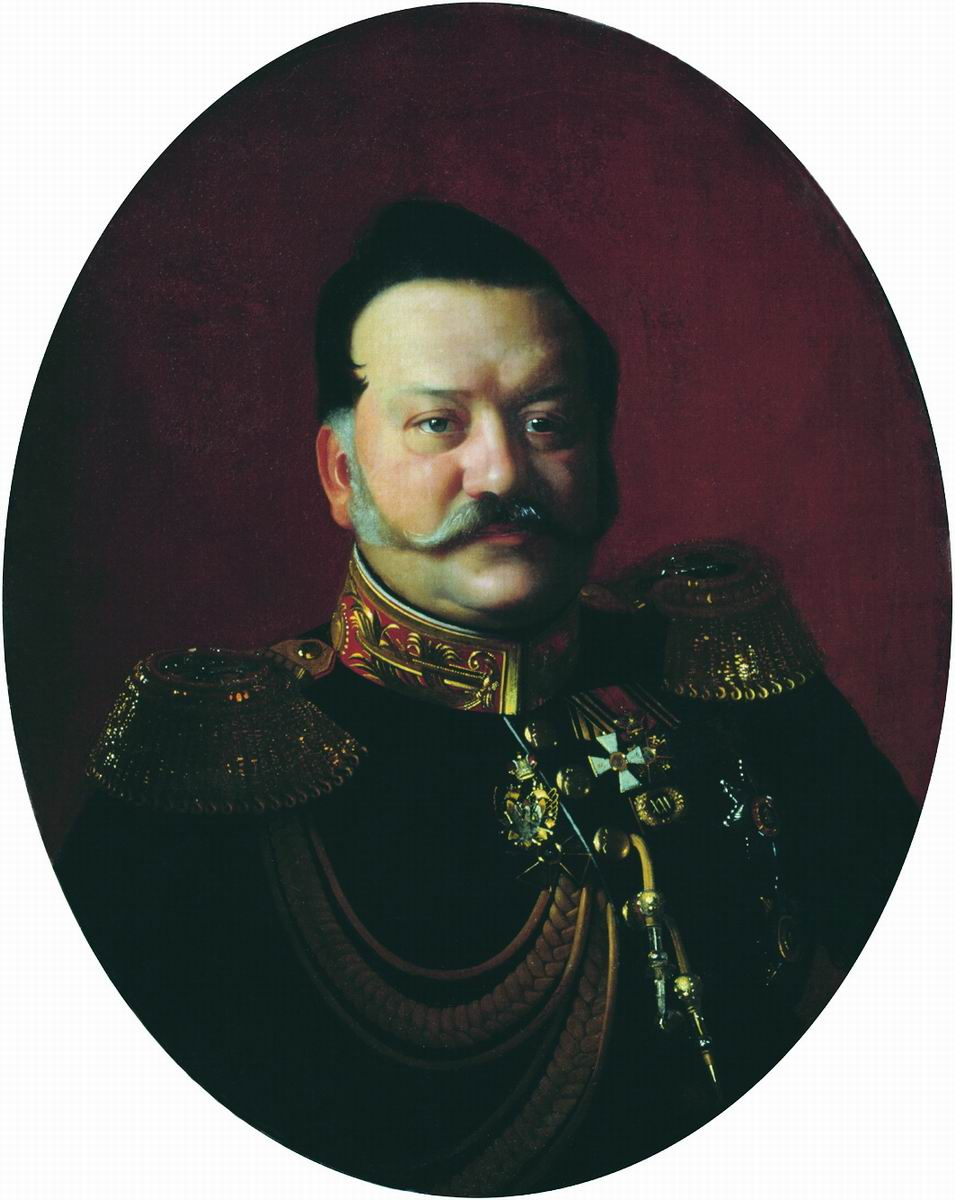
Portrait by Sergey Zaryanko

Iakov Ivanovich Rostovtsev (9 January 1804 [O.S. 28 December 1803] – 18 February [O.S. 6 February] 1860) was a Russian general. He was leading figure in the formulation of statutes which effectively emancipated the Russian serfs.

== Biography ==
Signature of Yakov Rostovtsev

Born in Saint Petersburg, Russia, Rostovtsev became a career soldier, and was a young officer at the time of the 1825 Decembrist revolt. When he was invited to join the plot, he instead reported it to Emperor Nicholas I, though without revealing the names of the officers involved.

Rostovtsev went on to hold posts in military education, and was involved in the administration of the cadet corps, reaching the rank of Full General.

In 1857, when the Emperor made public his plans under the Nazimov Rescript to reform the institution of serfdom, Rostovtsev was appointed to the Editing Commission charged with developing those plans, after a conservative leaning secret commission found Emancipation to be impossible. His subsequent report was well received, and brought him the chairmanship of the Commission whose task was to draft the necessary statutes.

The resulting statutes were issued on 19 February 1861, a year after Rostovtsev's death. On that occasion Rostovtsev's widow and children were made Counts of the Russian Empire.

== Sources ==
- "Ростовцев, Яков Иванович" . Brockhaus and Efron Encyclopedic Dictionary (in Russian). 1906.
