= Ivan Ozerov =

Ivan Khristoforovich Ozerov
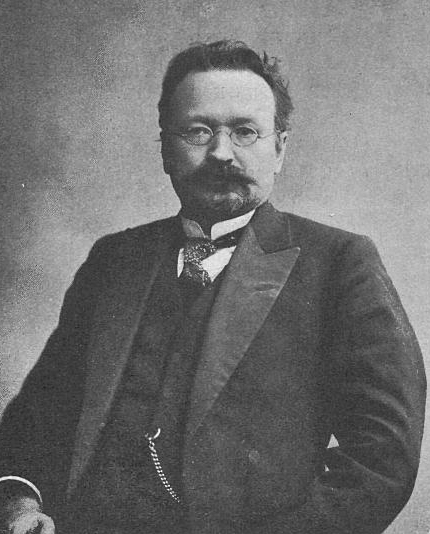
- Born: 10 [O.S. 1869] 5 Zanino (Kostroma Region), Chukhloma County, Kostroma Governorate
- Died: May 10, 1942; Leningrad
- Education: Law Faculty of Moscow State University (1891)
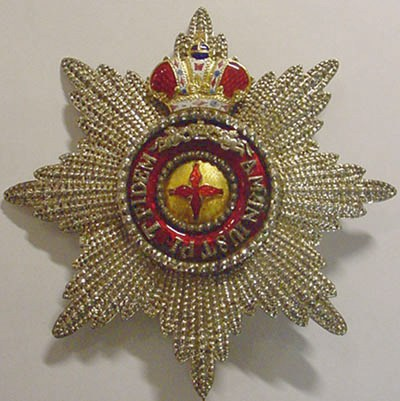
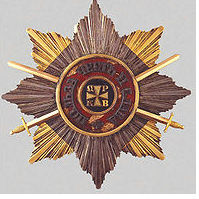
- Awards: Order of St. Anne, 2 degrees Order of St. Vladimir, 4 degrees
- Scientific career
- Workplaces: Moscow Imperial University, St. Petersburg Imperial University, Moscow State University
- Doctoral advisor: Doctor of Law (1900)
- Other academic advisors: professor

Ivan Khristoforovich Ozerov (17 October [O.S. 5 October] 1869 – May 10, 1942), who also wrote under the pseudonym Ikhorov, was a Russian professor, financier, economist, urban planning specialist, and prose writer.

== Biography ==
Ozerov was born in 1869 to a peasant family. After studying at a two-year folk school, he showed such promise that his teachers helped arrange for Ozerov to attend the Chukhloma city school, and from there to the prominent Kostroma gymnasium. He studied at the gymnasium on a Susanin scholarship (1881–1889) and graduated with a gold medal.

In 1889, he traveled to Moscow to study in the law faculty of Moscow University. Under the leadership of professor I. I. Yanzhula, Ozerov studied economic sciences and finance. After graduating with a diploma of the 1st degree, he was appointed in November 1893 as a junior candidate for judicial positions in the Moscow Court of Justice and from January 1894 studied at the Department of Financial Law in order to prepare for a doctorate. In 1896 he was sent on a mission to Europe, where he examined the development of tax systems, financial law, customs policy, and entrepreneurship in Germany, England, France, and Switzerland.

In 1898 he received a master's degree for his thesis "Income tax in England and the economic and social conditions of its existence". In February 1900 he defended his doctoral thesis "The main trends in the development of direct taxation in Germany in connection with economic and social conditions" and was appointed as a professor of financial law at Moscow University.

In the 1900s I. Kh. Ozerov won a reputation as one of the most respected Russian scholarlys – economists. Thanks to his lectures, Ozerov enjoyed the same respect and sympathy among the students of Moscow University (among his students and friends were the poets M. A. Voloshin and L. L. Kobylinsky). Ozerov had the idea of creating a Student Bank in Moscow to issue loans for education with the condition of repaying them after the end of the course, growing to its cliff: economic life waves are currently rising high, and it is necessary that a person know how to break away from cliffs in time, change places, adapt to new conditions, and here the state has major tasks – this is why the task of expanding the horizons of the population, the task public education plays a major role in the present".

Ozerov was not a desk scientist, but a practical scientist, enthusiastic and tireless enlightener. "I, as the son of the working people, wanted to be useful, and, being raised at the expense of the people, climbing up through his shoulders, I wanted to be useful in spreading knowledge among him and awakening in him energy and creativity in economic life", – he wrote.

In 1901, he took part in the activities of the Moscow Society of Mutual Assistance of Mechanical Production Workers, created on the initiative of S. V. Zubatov. He organized popular lectures for workers in the Historical Museum in Moscow and drafted a charter for the Society. When it became known that the security department was involved in the creation of society, Ozerov did not give up lectures and convened something like an arbitration court of public figures, who found the lecturers useful.

He told about his participation in the activities of the Company in detail in the book "Policy on the Work Issue in Russia over the past years".

In the summer of 1907, Ozerov was transferred to St. Petersburg University, while remaining at the same time a lecturer at Moscow University – was a private assistant professor at the faculty of law. He also taught at the Bestuzhev women's courses and at the highest women's courses of N. P. Raev in St. Petersburg, as well as at the Pedagogical Academy.

In July 1911, he was again appointed an ordinary professor at Moscow University and headed the department of financial law until April 1917.

At the same time, he was from October 1912 a supernumerary ordinary professor at the Moscow Commercial Institute, taught finance and a history of economic life and economics at the Shanyavsky Moscow City People's University. Since 1914 – member of the legal test committee at Moscow University.

Since 1909 – elected member of the State Council of the Academy of Sciences and universities.

I. Kh. Ozerov spoke in many cities of Russia with public lectures. He took part in the work of various government commissions of the Ministry of Finance, trade and industry. With research and development goals going around Russia, getting acquainted with real production and banking activities, Ozerov gave entrepreneurs, engineers and accountants a wide variety of vital advice: "I saw that there was something to attach to the head torso or tail": so, he recommended that he buy a forest area in a paper mill so as not to depend on wood prices; cement plant – to build a driveway to use cheap Moscow region coals; Moscow Mayor – to use the coal burned in the mines near Moscow to light and heat the city.

From January 1, 1914 – State Councilor; he was awarded the Order of St. Anne of the 2nd degree (1909) and the Order of St. Vladimir of the 4th degree (1912).

In April 1917 he resigned from Moscow University. After the revolutionary year of 1917, the Ozerov, unlike many Russian bankers and entrepreneurs, did not follow in emigration and stayed in Russia, where he continued his scientific activities, in particular, he developed the concept of creating an agricultural bank, studied the financial problems of domestic and foreign trade, and studied the scientific organization of labor.

In 1918, I. Kh. Ozerov became the economic adviser to Hetman Skoropadsky in Ukraine. In 1919 he returned to Moscow. Lectured at the Industrial Institute. He served at the Institute for Environmental Research (since 1919), collaborated with the Financial and Economic Institute of the People's Commissariat of Finance. He taught at the Faculty of Social Sciences of Moscow State University (1920/1921); taught the course "Introduction to Financial Science". Cooperating with the Economist magazine of the industrial and economic department of the Russian Technical Society, he proposed effective, in his view, ways to get the country out of the chaos. In 1919–1921 he taught at the MFEU, taught the course "Fundamentals of Financial Science".

In 1922, the possibility of expelling Ozerov on a "philosophical ships" was considered, but in the end the scientist was recognized as not dangerous. In 1927 he retired.

He was arrested on January 28, 1930, and sentenced to capital punishment with the replacement of 10 years in prison. The whole of 1930 was in the Butyrka prison, then he served his sentence on Solovki and on the White Sea–Baltic Canal. In 1933, he was amnestied and he went to Voronezh, where his wife was exile. By a decree of the Central Executive Committee of the USSR of June 19, 1935, his conviction was lifted and in 1936 he and his wife were settled in the Nursing House of Scientists in Leningrad. There Ozerov and died during the blockade of Leningrad; He was buried at Piskaryovsky cemetery.

In St. Petersburg, in the Department of Manuscripts of the Public Library there are unpublished memories of Ozerov (F.541.Op.1.D..4).

According to the conclusion of the USSR Prosecutor's office of January 21, 1991, it was fully rehabilitated.

== Economic views ==
At the beginning of the 20th century, I. Kh. Ozerov became famous for his numerous works on the modernization of the socio-economic and state system of Russia. Ozerov left behind more than 50 books, dozens of articles. Ozerov was the author of the first and only before the revolution textbook "Fundamentals of Financial Science", which withstood five reprints. He is the author of the book "On the New Way. To the economic liberation of Russia, "" What does America teach us? "", The society of consumers. Historical sketch of their development in Western Europe, America and Russia "", Financial reform in Russia. Where does the state take money from us and what does it spend for them? "", The struggle of society and the state with bad working conditions "", The development of universal solidarity "", To fight against the people's darkness! " and others. He advocates, in particular, reforming the structure of the university social sciences teaching, the creation in classical universities of the faculties of economics, with the obligatory introduction of courses of national and world history, and the extensive professional training of management personnel for Russian industry and banking institutions. The main topics in the works of I. Kh. Ozerov were questions of the development of the domestic economy and the recovery of the financial system of the country. However, he paid no less attention to the problems of institutionalizing group interests, considering them in the context of changes in the economic life of Europe and the United States. His research echoed in general the theoretical developments of representatives of the German historical school (including in the analysis of specific historical and economic problems), as well as the findings of T. Veblen.

=== Views on industrialization ===
Russian society in the issue of industrialization of Russia stood at a very low level. Russian society lived a noble moral: away from industry, this is an unclean thing and unworthy of every intellectual. But to sit playing cards, drinking at the same time and scolding the government is the real occupation of the thinking person. <...> We still had populist ideas that prevailed <...> that is, industry is not a public matter, but a private one, that every industrialist is a crook who needs to be imprisoned, that he does not do anything useful; they did not understand that planting a large and strong industry, and with it the working class, is our greatest business

I was very enthusiastic about the industrialization of Russia, and I was often called the troubadour of Russian industry. I dreamed of drinking, infecting our country with creative enthusiasm and urged everyone to participate in creating industry in our country; it's time to stop being a tributary of Europe, you have to stand on your own feet, especially when we have such natural wealth; and I urged everyone, from old man to youth, to stand under the banner of economism, to buy shares of industrial enterprises, if not by creative activity to participate in the creation of industry, then at least with their own savings

=== Views on entrepreneurship and cooperation ===
Ozerov believed that "we need to create a new type of entrepreneur, with a broad outlook, on a large scale, with other methods" He spoke and wrote about the need to establish in Russia "an elastic social system that would give everyone the opportunity to develop their strength", advocated raising interest in science, raising "another generation with different heads and other habits", spoke in favor of switching from low-paid labor to highly paid.

Ozerov was looking for more fair socially-organized forms of production and considered co-operation counter-monopoly. He believed that in a historical perspective, cooperation could make adjustments to the legal system, improve the budget, and reveal its potential. Ozerov was the most consistent of the so-called consumer societies, capable of uniting different classes, reducing or completely blocking social tensions that inevitably grow under capitalism. According to him, in the consumer society "people of different classes, estates <...> come together for a common cause, and they learn to appreciate each other and respect. The upper classes will not be so indifferent to the demands of the working class, and the workers, in turn, will become familiar with the production mechanism, marketing conditions, market influence on him, and will make practical demands".

It is noteworthy that the Old Believers entrepreneurship relied on the ideas of Ozerov in their successful entrepreneurial activity.

=== Views on state intervention in the economy ===
Ozerov was convinced that much depends on the government, that the far-sighted government will build Russia's economic well-being "on its natural foundation – the well-being of the Russian peasant. Otherwise, all this economic development will be ephemeral. " The economic life of Russia under Nicholas II reminded Ozerov "the life of a player depending on the harvest and crop failure".

Ozerov emphasized that without a reversal of the general economic policy of the Stolypin agrarian reforms, which he hailed as a "creative" undertaking of the government of "great importance", "there can't be much confusion".

=== Views on financial policy ===
Ozerov was outraged by the course of the Ministry of Finance, when huge sums were sent to the current accounts of foreign banks, feeding the foreign money market, instead of using these funds for the development of the national economy.

Ozerov spoke out against setting up a wine-vodka foundation for the budget of agricultural Russia and called for "pumping up and pumping very energetically into the pockets of the population".

The country has been practicing tax-paying taxation for decades – even for certain segments of the population. This, moreover, that the peasants had long been different in terms of property, and the landowners – who had become rich and who had gone bankrupt – and the heterogeneity of the trading brethren was clearly conspicuous. For years, Ozerov advocated the introduction of a differentiated (elastic) income tax, argued in the stimulating value of this innovation (long known in Europe and America) for the development of classes and economic life, for replenishing state coffers.

Ozerov had his own ("non-partisan") program for the recovery of the Russian budget, which was mainly fed by consumption taxes. It provided for a redistribution of the tax burden in favor of the poor and a wider taxation of inheritances, review of official salary rates for senior officials, stopping the pernicious practices of unspoken budgets, strengthening the state control system and turning it into an effective force, nurturing conscientiousness with Russian taxpayers.

In the book "How People's Money Is Spent in Russia" (1908), Ozerov writes:

State funds were often spent with us essentially wrong, not in the interests of the national economy as a whole, as productive expenditures occupied an absolutely insignificant place in our budget ...

The management of our state economy must be completely public, and it's time to end the clerical secret here ...

Our central bank is in an abnormal position, it is known to be subject to the sole authority ...

The figures of our state budget do not always express the actual costs of a particular need. Many departments and agencies have their own special funds or special capital from which funds are drawn for various kinds of goals and objectives ...

The oil economy is also rationally conducted by us. Government power is heavily influenced by big business. The country needs money, and the oil owners never get big dividends for anything ...

We had enough money for everything, but we lacked them for the culture of the brain, the head ...

Our ugly tax system should be radically rebuilt. Until now, it was built under the influence of minute moods: money was needed, and they tried to scoop them where, at a given time, it would be easier and easiest to get them, without at all coping with the effect this would have on the population.

== Urban planning ==
In 1906 he published the book "Big Cities, Their Tasks and Management Tools", becoming one of the founders of the theory of urban planning. Criticized Russian cities compared to European ones for backwardness of transport communications.

== Writing activities ==
At the beginning of the 20th century, under the pseudonym Z. Ikhorov published the artistic works "Confession of a Man", "Notes of a Suicide", "Songs of a Homeless Man".

== Commercial activity ==
In 1911, Ozerov was invited to the board of the Russian-Asian Bank A. I. Putilov. Then Ozerov in the "Russian Word" published an article about the speculation of Russian banks, for which all members of the board took up arms against him, and he was forced to leave the bank.

Ozerov was a shareholder and board member of the Lena gold mines, the Erivan cement plant, the Tula land bank, the Khanzhonkov joint-stock company, the Russian paper-processing factory, the Sytin publishing house, the Lapshin match factory and others. offered I. D. Sytin cooperation for publishing his own newspaper in order to "gain influence on the formation of public opinion in our country", however, Sytin did not want to quarrel with the government, which gave orders for printing textbooks. Shortly before the February Revolution, Ozerov bought up the shares of the Erinsky cement plant for 105 rubles, and then sold them for 300, earning more than 1 million rubles.

== Lifestyle ==
I.Kh. Ozerov walked in the same clothes for years, did not chic in restaurants, traveled in second class. However, this did not prevent him from giving in to various temptations: "he did not mind, in his words", drink and take a walk with ballerinas, "he tried drugs, wrote screenplays for A. A. Khanzhonkov".

In 1911, he bequeathed all of his capital to the economic education of the population, free distribution of millions of copies of his books and articles, "calling for creativity" in all villages, villages, parish governments, factories. In this act, he followed in the trail of a well-known entrepreneur-philanthropist Kh. S. Ledentsov, who was among the executors, fulfilling his testamentary will.

== Attitude towards revolutionary transformations ==
In 1915, Ozerov sharply criticized the current situation:

If Peter the Great had risen at the present time, how bitter it would be for him to see what is happening with us, our stagnation. It is precisely this lag from other countries that I constantly emphasize. The abyss separating us from other countries is growing and growing, despite the industrial progress, with the cash we are present at present.

Ozerov, more clearly than many (especially after the 1905 revolution), saw what misfortunes threatened Russia with the unresolved political, economic and social problems. The tsarist regime, he considered obsolete, barren, contrary to the interests of the country.

In 1917, a scientist unflatteringly responded to the Provisional Government, whose ministers "did not argue about land reform, but about whether it was possible to allow meetings in the territory along which the trams pass and their rails run".

In January 1918, Ozerov published in the newspaper "Our Time" an article entitled "Coming builders – cold and hunger." In it he writes:

We will not ignite the European proletariat with our insane childish attempt to create a socialist system. True, we will insure the whole world at our expense from the production of such experiments, and perhaps this is our historical mission – to be dung for true culture.

== Writings ==
- Income tax in England and the economic and social conditions of its existence (1898; master's thesis);
- "The main trends in the development of direct taxation in Germany" (1900; doctoral dissertation);
- "What is a consumer society? How to establish and lead it "(St. Petersburg, 1896) – the gold medal at the World Exhibition in Paris (1900) and the prize of the law faculty of Moscow University;
- "The results of the economic development of the XIX century" (St. Petersburg, 1902);
- "Mail in Russia and abroad" (St. Petersburg, 1902);
- "Factory committees and collective agreement" (Moscow, 1902);
- "Consumer society. A historical sketch of their development in Western Europe, America and Russia. Brief Guide to the Foundation and Management of Consumer Societies "1st edition in 1894, 2nd augmented edition issued by" S. Dorovatovsky and A. Charushnikov "in 1899 with a circulation of 3200 copies. In 1909 it was reissued in an abbreviated form Sytin.
- "The development of universal solidarity" (Moscow, 1902);
- "On the methods of studying financial science" (Moscow, 1903);
- "America goes to Europe" (St. Petersburg, 1903);
- "Sketches of the economic and financial life of Russia and the West" (2nd collection of articles, Moscow, 1904);
- "Confessions of a person at the turn of the 20th century" (under pseudo. Ihor, M., 1904);
- On the new path! To the economic liberation of Russia (Moscow, 1904)
- "Financial right. Issue I. The doctrine of ordinary income "; issue II: "Budget, local finance, govt. credit "(Moscow, 1905);
- "The needs of the working class in Russia" (Moscow, 1905);
- "Insurance of workers in Germany" (brochure).
- "Policy on the working question in Russia in recent years (according to unpublished documents)" (Moscow, 1906).
- "Financial Policy" (Oserow, I. Die Finanzpolitik. In: Melnik, J. (1906): Russen über Russland. Frankfurt a. M., Rütten & Loening, S. 208–250).
- The Russian Budget (1907);
- "What does America teach us?" (1908)
- "Mining plants of the Urals" (1910);
- "Fundamentals of Financial Science" (university course); 4th edition, 1913.
- Ozerov I. Kh. Large cities, their tasks and management tools. With 15 diagrams (public lecture). – M., 1906. – 52 p.
- Ozerov I. Kh. Basics of financial science. Budget. Forms of charging. Local finance. Credit / (reissue of 1906). – M .: YurInfor-Press, 2008. – 622 p. (inaccessible link)
- Ozerov I. Kh. How are people's money spent in Russia? Criticism of the Russian expenditure budget and state control (according to unpublished documents). – M .: Type. T.-v. I. D. Sytin, 1908. – 305 p.
- Ozerov I. Kh. Economic Russia and its financial policy at the end of the 19th century and the beginning of the 20th century / Edition of DS S. Gorshkov. – M .: Type. t-va I. N. Kushnerev and Co., 1905. – 259 p.
- I. Kh. From the life of work. Digest of articles. (Issue 1. Articles on the working question.) / D. S. Gorshkov’s publication. – M .: B.I., 1904. – 293 p.
- Our higher school and life (for youth) // Journal "New Word" No. 1, 1914
- Notes suicide (under pseudo. Ihor; M., 1911)
- Songs of the homeless (under the pseudo. Ihor; M., 1912)

== Modern edition ==
Ozerov I. Kh. How are people's money spent in Russia ?. – Society of Merchants and Industrialists of Russia, 2005. – 312 p. – (Economic history of Russia).

== Literature ==
- Imperial Moscow University: 1755–1917: Encyclopedic Dictionary / Andreev A. Yu., Tsygankov D. A. .. – Moscow: Russian Political Encyclopedia (ROSSPEN), 2010. – p. 527—528. – 894 s. – 2 000 copies – ISBN 978-5-8243-1429-8.
- Volkov V. A., Kulikova M. V., Loginov V. S. Moscow professors of the XVIII – beginning of the XX centuries. Humanities and social sciences. – M .: Janus-K, 2006. – p. 180. – 300 p. – 2000 copies – ISBN 5-8037-0318-4.

== External sources ==
- М. Н. Барышников At the root of Russian institutionalism (from the creative heritage of I. Kh. Ozerov)
- M.N. Baryshnikov I. Kh. Ozerov: INSTITUTES, GROUP INTERESTS AND DEVELOPMENT OF THE ECONOMY
- Evgeny Efimov Happy bitter life of Ivan Ozerov
- "Ozerov Ivan Khristoforovich". Chronicle of Moscow University.
