= Pamyatnaya Knizhka =

Pamyatnaya knizhka (Russian: Памятная книжка, lit. 'memorial book') is the title of official reference books of regions and towns in the Russian Empire.

== History ==
The books were annually published by local authorities in 89 gubernias and regions of Russian Empire starting from the mid-1830s till 1917. They provide information on population and businesses in the course of over 60 years. Over two thousand books have been found.

In 1920, Lazar Kaganovich had the Pamyatnaya Knizhka Sovetskogo Stroitelya (Memoir Book of Soviet Construction) written to extoll the accomplishments of Soviet expansion and control in Turkmenistan. It covered the official policies of the Soviet worker force, how their political structure was organized, and the specific methods used within the Soviet system to obtain support from the local population.

== Composition of Pamyatnaya knizhka ==
The books had some peculiarities in some gubernias and not always comprised 4 main sections:

- address-calendar (index of all local official institutions and their staff),
- administrative reference book (information on administrative units in a gubernia, post offices, roads, industrial and commercial enterprises, hospitals and chemists', educational institutions, museums and libraries, bookstores and print shops, periodicals, list of towns, major landowners etc.),
- statistic data (statistic tables on population, farming, education, incomes, fires etc.);
- historical background.

== Research project ==
The Russian National Library is carrying out a research project devoted to Pamyatnaya knizhka. The project is supervised by Mrs. Nadezhda Balatskaya Надежда Михайловна Балацкая in the department Bibliografia and krayevedeniye of the Russian National Library. The project comprises official memorial books Pamyatnay knizhkas of all gubernias and regions of Russia, including areas that are no longer within the Russian Federation. The main result of the project will be the publication of 15 volume bibliographic index book titled "Памятные книжки губерний и областей Российской империи: Указатель содержания". Some of materials in work are available at national computer center. Рабочие материалы проекта представляют огромный интерес для людей, занимающихся генеалогией. That is an important source for genealogic researchers.
