= Maria Perekusikhina =

Russian memoirist and courtier (1739–1824)

Maria Savvishna Perekusikhina
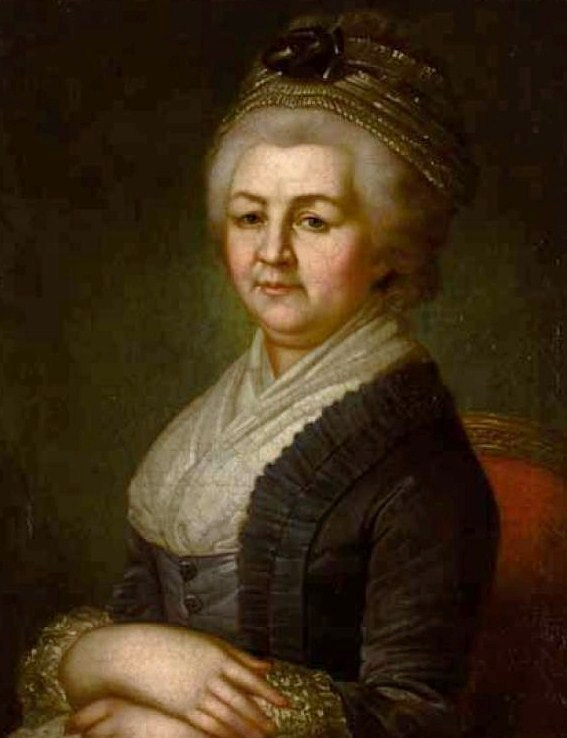
- Born: Марья Саввишна Перекусихина; 1739; Ryazan
- Died: 8 August 1824 (aged 84–85); Saint Petersburg, Russian Empire
- Buried: Lazarev Cemetery

Maria Savvishna Perekusikhina (Russian: Марья Саввишна Перекусихина; 1739–1824), was a Russian memoirist, a maid of honour of Empress Catherine the Great of Russia. She was a close friend and confidant of Catherine and quite influential.

== Life ==
Maria came from a poor noble family in the Ryazan province. Information about how she ended up at court has not been preserved, but in the 1760s, the empress baptised her niece. Her brother Vasili Savvich Perekusikhin (1724–1788) received a good education and died as a senator, so it assumed that the family had some resources. She was content with her unofficial position at court, but she bothered a lot about her brother's family. It is unknown who her niece's (Ekaterina) mother was, and has been speculated that her brother was widowed, as Maria was helping to raise her. Ekaterina was married to Ardalion Aleksandrovich Torsukov (1754–1810), who rose to the rank of chief chamberlain of the court.

Perekusikhin soon acquired her affection and such great importance at court that even the greatest nobles sought her friendship and favour. She was a trusted friend and confidant of the Empress, and was constantly in her company. She was the first person the Empress saw in the day, who helped her dress and accompanied her on all her travels and on some ceremonial trips.

She was among those who were present at Catherine's last minutes. After her death, it was ordered by Paul I to "dismiss the maiden Maria Perekusikhin from the court and give her a service pension from the Cabinet of one thousand two hundred rubles a year." She lived out the remainder of life peacefully, surrounded by portraits of Catherine and her furniture. She died at the age of 85, far from court and in complete obscurity. She was buried at the Lazarevskoye cemetery of the Alexander Nevsky Lavra.
