= Alexander Nikolaevich Volzhin =

Volzhin Aleksandr Nikolaevich
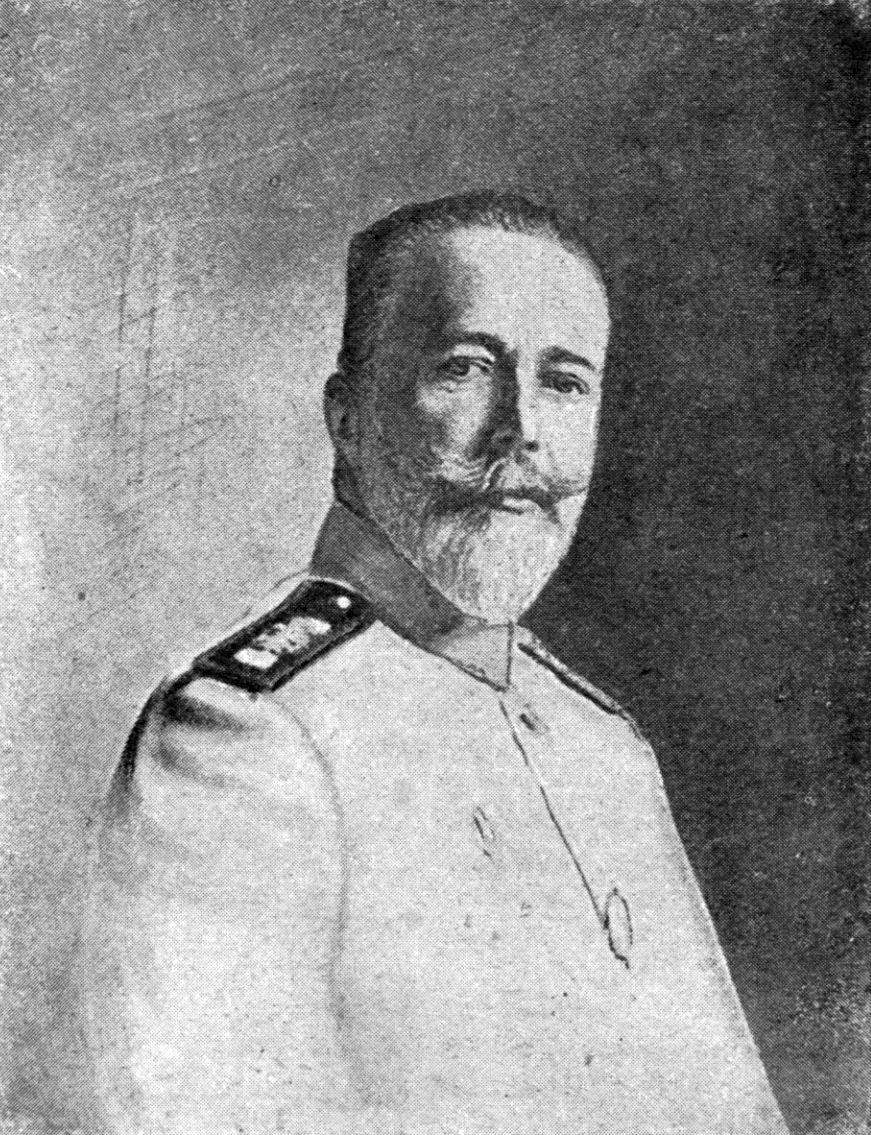
- Born: May 8, 1860 village of Bereza (Kursk region), Dmitrievsky uyezd, Kursk Governorate, Russian Empire
- Died: January 2, 1933 (aged 72); Nice
- Burial place: Kokad Russian Cemetery
- Education: Katkovsky Lyceum
- Occupations: Member of the State Council of Appointment, August 7, 1916 – May 1, 1917 Ober-Prosecutor of the Holy Synod, September 30, 1915 – August 7, 1916 Director of the Department of General Affairs of the Ministry of Interior, July 7, 1914 – September 30, 1915 Kholm Governor, September 1, 1913 – July 7, 1914
- Parent: Volzhin
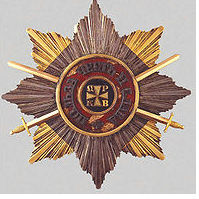
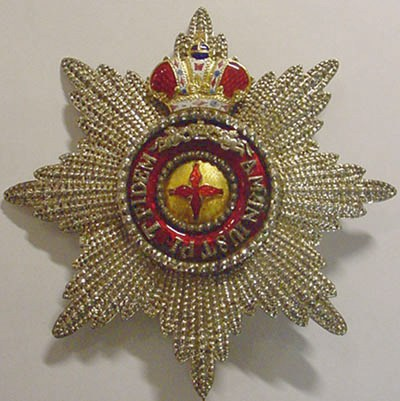
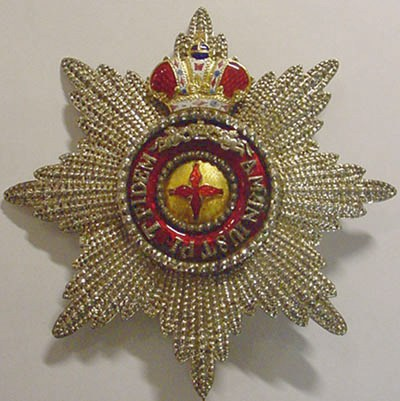
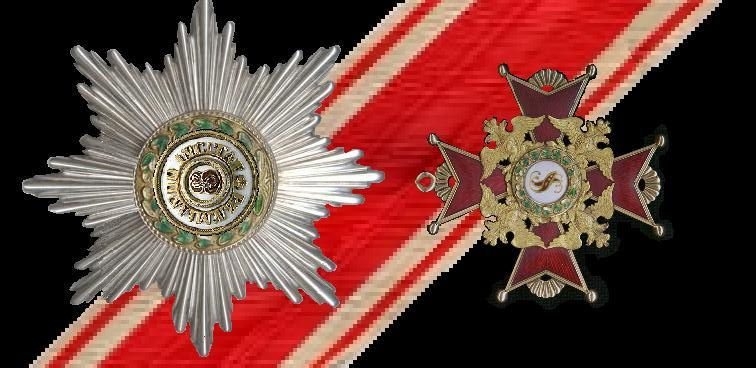
- Awards: Order of St. Vladimir, 3 degrees Order of St. Anna, 1 degree Order of St. Anna, 2 degrees Order of St. Stanislav, 1 degree Medal In memory of the coronation of Emperor Alexander III Medal In memory of the reign of Emperor Alexander III Medal "In memory of the coronation of Emperor Nicholas II" Medal For the first general census Medal "In memory of the 100th anniversary of the Patriotic War of 1812" Medal "In memory of the 300th anniversary of the reign of the Romanov dynasty"

Aleksandr Nikolaevich Volzhin (Russian: Во́лжин; May 8, 1860 – January 2, 1933, Nice) was a Russian statesman, first governor of Kholm Governorate, chief procurator of the Holy Synod and a member of the State Council by appointment.

== Biography ==
Orthodox. From the old noble family of the Kursk province. The landowner of Kursk (1160 dessiatin) and Podolsk (2300 acres of a wife) provinces. The son of Dmitrievskiy district leader of the nobility of the retired staff captain Nikolai Nikolayevich Volzhin (1821–1727 / 1887).

He graduated from the gymnasium course (with honors) and the university department at the lyceum of the Tsarevich Nicholas, then passed the exam of the subjects taught at the law faculty. On the departure of conscription went abroad, he went abroad to familiarize himself with the agricultural business in Hungary and Bavaria. Returning to Russia, he engaged in agriculture in his Kursk estate. November 24, 1889 he was appointed Olgopol district leader of the nobility, and in 1897 - Podolsk provincial leader of the nobility.

Ranks: Chamberlain (1902), Active State Councillor (1910), in the position of Chamberlain (1914).

From February 1904 - Sedletsk Governor. Consisted as a full member of the Kiev Club of Russian Nationalists, as well as an honorary member of the Kholmsky Holy Mother of God Brotherhood and the Russian Red Cross Society.

On September 1, 1913 - the first governor of the newly established Kholm Governorate. From July 7, 1914 - director of the Department of General Affairs of the Ministry of Internal Affairs. On September 30, 1915, he was appointed as acting chief procurator of the Holy Synod, January 1, 1916 approved in office. In 1915, the Petrograd Metropolitan Volodymyr (Theophany) was transferred to Kiev and appointment to the Petrograd department of Metropolitan Pitirim (Oknova).

On August 7, 1916, at the insistence of the empress, he was dismissed from his post with an appointment to the State Council.

After the February Revolution, he left for the south of the country, in March 1918 he emigrated. He lived in Malta, Italy, Bavaria, in recent years - in Nice, France. He was buried in the graveyard of Kokad in Nice.

== Family ==
He was married to princess Olga Alekseevna Dolgorukova (1867–1946). Their children:

- Nikolai (1887–1948), a graduate of the Alexander Lyceum, an official of the State Chancellery. In emigration to Belgium.
- Alexey (1891–1946), a graduate of the Alexander Lyceum, staff captain of the Cavalry Regiment. In emigration to Bessarabia.
- Elizabeth (1894—?)

== Awards ==
Order of St. Anne 2nd degree (1896)

Order of St. Vladimir 3rd degree (1913)

Order of St. Stanislav 1st degree (1914)

Order of St. Anne 1st Class (1915)

- Medal "In Memory of the Coronation of Emperor Alexander III" (1883);
- Medal "In memory of the reign of Emperor Alexander III"
- Medal "In memory of the coronation of Emperor Nicholas II"
- Medal "For the works on the first general census of the population"
- Red Cross Medal "In memory of the Russo-Japanese War of 1904–1905"
- Medal "In memory of the 100th anniversary of the Patriotic War of 1812"
- Medal "In Memory of the 300th Anniversary of the Reign of the House of Romanov" (1913).

== Sources ==
- Pamyatnaya Knizhka Kholmsk province for 1914. Hill, 1914. SS. 65, 108-111.
- List of civil ranks of the first four classes. - Pg., 1914. - p. 1292.
- List of civilian ranks of the fourth class. Corrected on March 1, 1916. - Pg., 1916. - p. 1589.
- Russian foreign countries in France 1919-2000. L. Mnukhin, M. Avril, V. Losskaya. - Moscow, 2008.
- Biography in the "Orthodox Encyclopedia"
- Correspondence of Nikolay and Alexandra: 1914-1917
- Higher bureaucracy of the Russian Empire. Short Dictionary
- A man in the royal house. Notes on Grigory Rasputin (collection)
