= Prometey Central Scientific Research Institute Of Structural Materials =

Russian research institute

- Type: Federal State Unitary Enterprise
- Founded: 1936
- Headquarters: Saint Petersburg, Russia
- Parent: Kurchatov Institute

Prometey Central Scientific Research Institute Of Structural Materials (Russian: ЦНИИ конструкционных материалов «Прометей») is a research institute based in Saint Petersburg, Russia.

The Prometey Institute develops and produces advanced alloys and conducts research in metallurgical and welding techniques. Product lines and activities include heavy armor research and development, metallurgical research for shipbuilding, defectoscope quality control measures, titanium-alloy for submarine hull construction, non-magnetic steels and alloys for anti-submarine vessels, high-strength hull steels, advanced propulsion system materials, aluminum alloys and titanium alloys for machinery system applications.

== Sanctions ==
On December 22, 2022, due to Russia’s invasion of Ukraine, the enterprise was added to the U.S. sanctions list targeting Russian naval entities “in response to Putin’s unprovoked war in Ukraine”. The enterprise is also included in the sanctions lists of Ukraine and Australia.
