= Procurator (Russia) =

The Procurator (Russian: прокурор, tr. prokuror) was an office initially established in 1722 by Peter the Great, the first Emperor of the Russian Empire, as part of the ecclesiastical reforms to bring the Russian Orthodox Church more directly under his control.

The Russian word also has the meaning of prosecutor but in this case the right translation is Delegate (having the procuration for religious affairs).

The Chief Procurator (also Over-Procurator; обер-прокурор, tr. ober-prokuror) was the official title of the Crown official who oversaw the validity of the acts of the Most Holy Synod (he wasn't a member of the Most Holy Synod but effectively he was the most important lay in the administration of the Russian Orthodox Church, not to be confused with the Primus or "Prime member", the legal chairman of the Most Holy Synod, always a Metropolitan or an Archbishop), and a member of the Tsar's cabinet. Konstantin Pobedonostsev, a former tutor both of Alexander III and of Nicholas II, was one of the most powerful men to hold the post, from 1880 to 1905.

The General Procurator (Procurator General) and the Chief Procurator were major supervisory positions in the Russian Governing Senate, which functioned from 1711 to 1917, with their meaning changing over time. Eventually Chief Procurator became the title of the head of a department of the Senate.

== List of Most Holy Synod Ober-Procurators ==
- 1722–1725 Ivan Boltin
- 1725–1730 Aleksei Baskakov
- 1730–1740 no appointments
- 1740–1741 Nikita Krechetnikov
- 1741–1753 Yakov Shakhovskoy
- 1753–1758 Afanasiy Lvov
- 1758–1763 Aleksei Kozlovskiy
- 1763–1768 Ivan Melissino
- 1768–1774 Pyotr Chebyshyov
- 1774–1786 Sergei Akchurin
- 1786–1791 Apollos Naumov
- 1791–1797 Count Aleksei Musin-Pushkin
- 1797–1799 Prince Vasiliy Khovanskiy
- 1799–1802 Count Dmitry Khvostov
- 1802–1803 Aleksandr Yakovlev
- 1803–1817 Prince Aleksandr Golitsyn
- 1817-1833 Prince Pyotr Meshcherskiy
- 1833–1836 Stepan Nechayev
- 1836–1855 Count Nikolay Protasov
- 1855–1856 Aleksandr Karasevskiy
- 1856–1862 Count Aleksandr Tolstoy
- 1862–1865 Aleksei Akhmatov
- 1865–1880 Count Dmitry Tolstoy
- 1880–1905 Konstantin Pobedonostsev
- 1905–1906 Prince Aleksei Obolenskiy
- 1906–1906 Prince Aleksei Shirinskiy-Shikhmatov
- 1906–1909 Pyotr Izvolskiy
- 1909–1911 Sergei Lukianov
- 1911–1915 Vladimir Sabler
- 1915–1915 Aleksandr Samarin
- 1915–1916 Alexander Volzhin
- 1916–1917 Nikolai Raev
- 1917–1917 Vladimir Lvov
- 1917–1917 Anton Kartashev

== See also ==
- Procurator General of the USSR
