= Catherine Yefimovskaya =

Russian Orthodox nun

Catherine
- Hegumenia
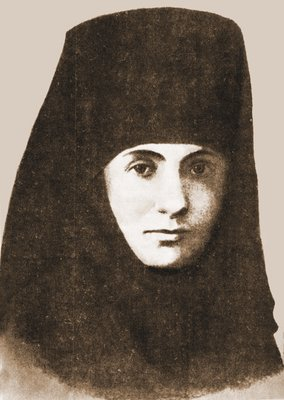
- Church: Russian Orthodox Church
- In office: 1889–1908

Personal details
- Born: Yevgeniya Yefimovskaya; August 18, 1850 Smolensk
- Died: October 15, 1925 (aged 75) Novo Hopovo Monastery
- Denomination: Eastern Orthodoxy

Catherine, secular name Yevgeniya Borisovna Yefimovskaya (born 28 August 1850 in Smolensk, died 15 October 1925 in the Novo Hopovo Monastery on Fruška Gora), was a Russian Orthodox nun and the founder of the Nativity of the Mother of God Monastery in Leśna. She is known for her concept of an active women's monastery within the Russian Orthodox Church.

Coming from a deeply religious aristocratic family, she obtained a university education in Russian language and literature and worked as a teacher at a model Orthodox school. Influenced by Slavophile ideas, she became an Orthodox nun, combining ascetic life with social work. She took her perpetual monastic vows in 1889 and became a hegumenia. Under her leadership, the monastery became one of the largest female monasteries in Russia, as well as a significant pilgrimage center and educational hub.

In 1915, she was evacuated from Leśna to Petrograd and later emigrated to Bessarabia and the Kingdom of Serbs, Croats, and Slovenes, where she helped restore the Novo Hopovo Monastery and promote women's monasticism in the Serbian Orthodox Church. An informal cult of Catherine as a saint exists within the Russian Orthodox Church Outside of Russia, and she was canonized by the Russian True Orthodox Church in 2010. She also authored studies on the role of deaconesses in early Christianity and participated in discussions about Russian monasticism in the early 20th century.

== Biography ==
=== Early life ===
She was the daughter of Count Boris Andreevich Yefimovsky, the Marshal of Nobility in the Gzhatsk district of the Smolensk Governorate, and his wife, a member of the princely Khilkov family. She had a brother and a younger sister. She was raised in the family home in Moscow and on their estate in Klementyevo near Smolensk. Her father was deeply religious and took a keen interest in Orthodox liturgy and the state of the Russian Orthodox Church. On major Orthodox holidays, he would invite many clergy to his Moscow home.

Yevgeniya Yefimovskaya received a private education. She first studied under an English governess and later with professors from Moscow State University, invited by her father. In 1869, she passed university exams, earning a diploma in Russian language and literature. She had a deep interest in literature, philosophy, and theology.

A few years later, her father became seriously ill, and her mother left Moscow to join him in Smolensk. During this time, Yevgeniya worked as a French teacher at the Nikolayevsky Institute. In 1874, her father died, and she opened her own boarding school. However, after three years, she had to close it due to a serious accident (a leg burn) that forced her to stop working. She recovered in the countryside and was deeply affected by the harsh living conditions of Russian peasants compared to the intellectual circles she knew.

After her recovery, Yevgeniya traveled to France, where she met Ivan Turgenev, and later to England. She returned to Russia in the 1880s and initially worked at the Yekaterina Institute in St. Petersburg. She then became the director of a shelter founded by Anna Aksakova. She sympathized with Slavophile ideas and moved in circles that supported them. She also corresponded with figures such as Vladimir Solovyov.

=== Teacher ===
The issue of raising children in the Orthodox faith had already been a subject of her reflection and interest, which led her to accept a teaching position at a parish school founded by Sergey Rachinsky in Tatyevo (Smolensk Governorate). Rachinsky, a pedagogue and social activist, envisioned the school as a model institution for primary education in the Orthodox spirit. While working at the school, Yevgenia Yefimovskaya decided to become an Orthodox nun and to establish a female monastery that would function differently from the existing monasteries of the Russian Orthodox Church. The monastic community, while maintaining a strict ascetic life, would simultaneously carry out extensive social work by organizing a hospital, school, and shelter. Church historian Pavel Zyryanov compared Yefimovskaya's vision and her determination to dedicate her life to serving the poor to the "going to the people" movement of wealthy and well-born activists of Narodnaya Volya in previous decades.

Initially, the woman sought the opportunity to implement these plans at the Veliko-Budissky Monastery in the Poltava Eparchy, where she worked as a parish school teacher, but her concept was rejected. However, Archbishop Leonty of Chełm and Warsaw took an interest in Yefimovskaya's idea. He invited the teacher to establish a female monastery in Leśna, in the buildings of the Pauline monastery closed after the January Uprising. Leonty envisioned that a female monastery engaged in social work would help convince the local population, Catholics or former Uniates reluctant to accept the forced religious change imposed in 1875, to embrace Orthodoxy, and thus support the Russification of the region.

Before departing for Leśna, the woman met with Starets Ambrose of Optina, who blessed her plans. Starets Ambrose also prepared a set of prayers that every nun in the newly formed community was to recite daily in her cell. The emerging monastery also received support from John of Kronstadt, who prayed for the sisters and provided them with funds from the donations he received. The clergyman also convinced one of his spiritual daughters, Pelagia Porshnieva of St. Petersburg, to donate land in the Russian capital for the establishment of a branch of the monastery.

At the same time, Yefimovskaya's vision of a working monastery, different from traditional patterns of women's monastic life in Russia, continued to face negative opinions from many Russian bishops. In their view, women could engage in charitable and educational work, but founding a monastery for this purpose and taking monastic vows was unnecessary.

=== Monastic life ===
==== Hegumenia of the monastery in Leśna ====
Yevgenia Yefimovskaya arrived in Leśna on 19 October 1885 with five women determined to join the monastery under her leadership and two orphaned girls, the first residents of the monastery's shelter. The following day, the community's activity began with a solemn service, although it initially did not have monastery status. This status was granted by the Most Holy Synod on 26 August 1889. That same year, Yefimovskaya took her perpetual monastic vows, receiving the monastic name Catherine, and was elevated to the rank of hegumenia. From its inception, the monastery in Leśna was a first-class monastery. When it was officially recognized as a monastery, 37 women resided there. In 1892, Hegumenia Catherine was awarded the Synodal Pectoral Cross.

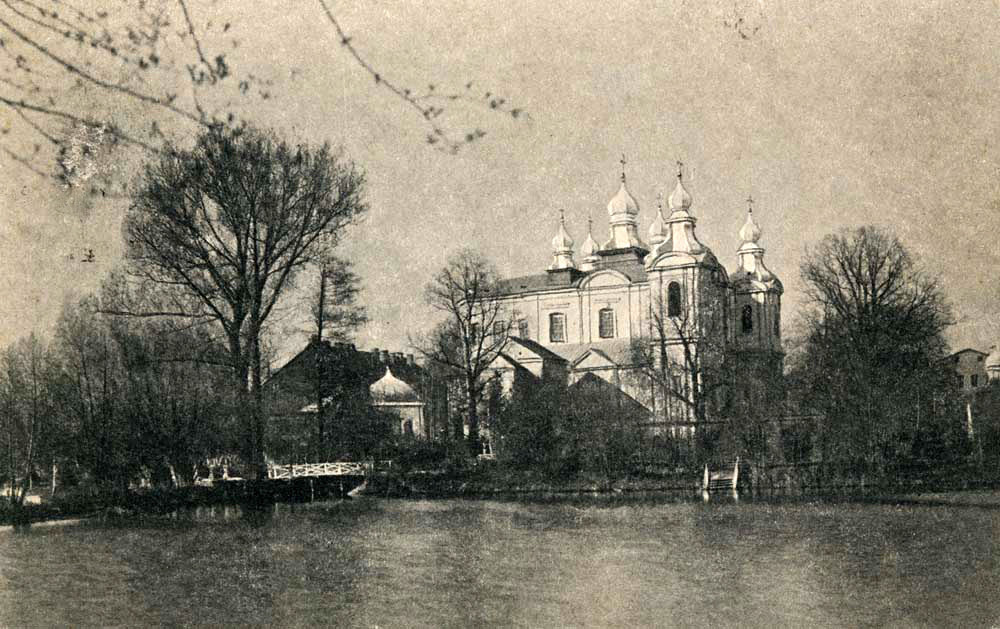
Monastery in Leśna

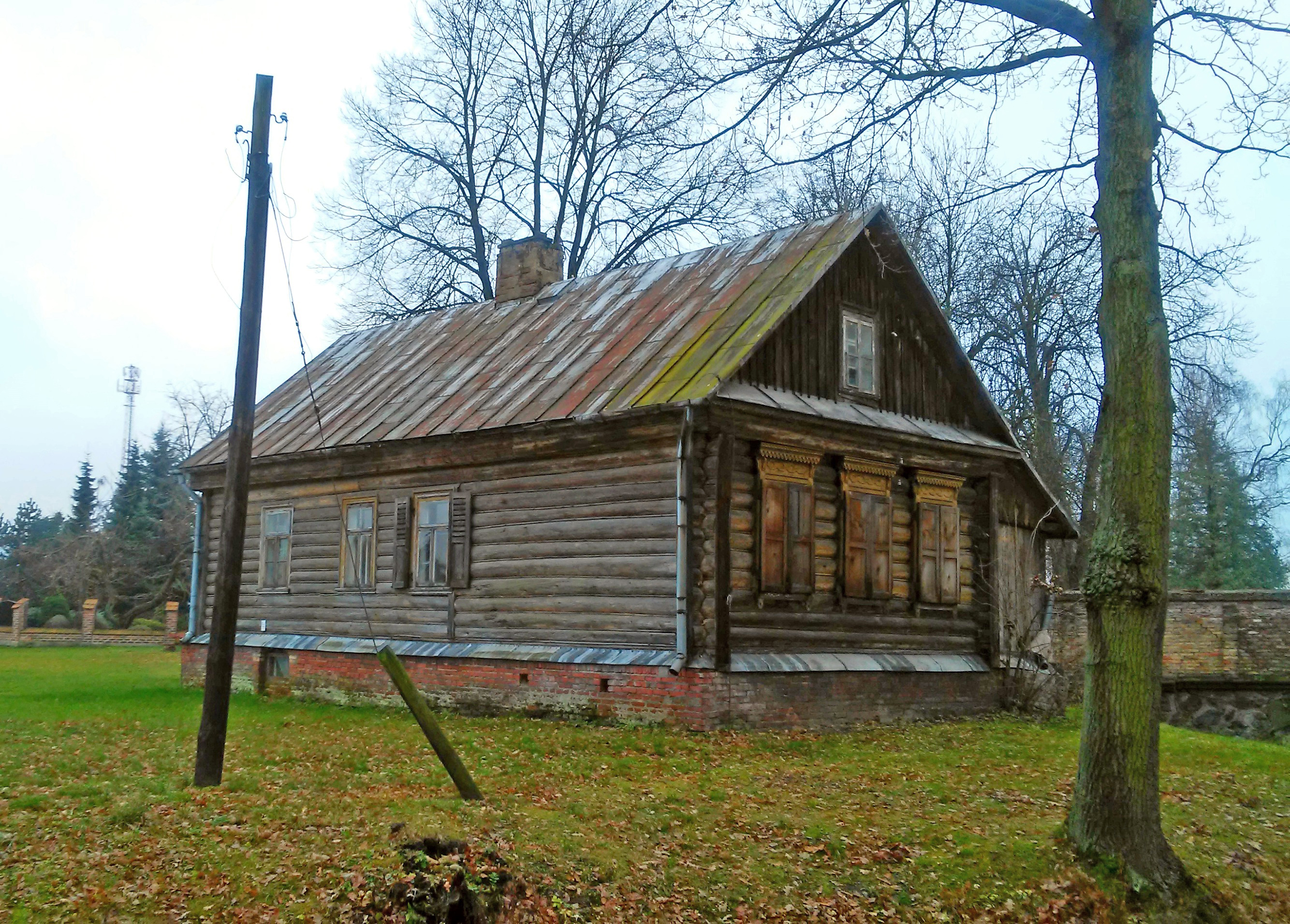
Wooden house in the monastery complex in Leśna, where Hegumenia Catherine lived

In the first years of its existence, Hegumenia Catherine personally worked on setting up the monastery and its church (in the former Pauline church). She also sang in the monastery choir and served as a chanter. She opened a school for 300 girls, offering them instruction in various handcrafts and Orthodox catechesis, as well as a boys' agricultural school and a female teacher's seminary. The seminary's main goal was to train future teachers to work in rural parish schools. In 1904, Hegumenia Catherine also opened a rural household school for girls. In total, in the early 20th century, around a thousand students were educated in the monastery's schools, with preference given to children from peasant or bourgeois families. Orthodox faith was not a mandatory requirement, and many Catholics attended the schools. Although the nuns did not force them to convert, every conversion was noted in the monastery's reports.

Under the hegumenia's initiative, a hospital and an outpatient clinic were also opened in Leśna, providing free medicine, along with a botanical garden focused on cultivating medicinal herbs. Hegumenia Catherine also organized a steam-powered mill, a church candle production facility, and oversaw the opening of a railway station in the village, allowing pilgrims easier access to the monastery.

Hegumenia Catherine actively participated in discussions about monastic life in Russia, its condition, and its relationship with society (especially with the intelligentsia), as well as the tasks facing the Russian Orthodox Church after the 1905 revolution, initiated by Metropolitan Anthony of Saint Petersburg. She corresponded regularly on theological topics with Bishops Mikhail Gribanovsky, Ambrose Klyucharyov, Anthony Vadkovsky, and Antony Khrapovitsky. In 1899, she hosted John of Kronstadt at the monastery in Leśna. Her work was highly valued by Bishop Eulogius of Lublin, and later of Chełm.

Under Hegumenia Catherine's leadership, the monastery in Leśna became one of the most important centers of female monastic life in Russia. In 1909, it housed over 700 nuns and novices, and during major monastery feasts, as many as 25,000 pilgrims would visit. Bishops regularly conducted services at the monastery. In 1914, there were 20 nuns and 300 novices living at the monastery. Hegumenia Catherine placed high spiritual demands on the candidates for monastic tonsure, often extending the period between joining the monastery and taking perpetual vows to many years.

In addition to its branch in Saint Petersburg, the monastery also had similar establishments in Chełm, Warsaw, and Yalta.

Hegumenia Catherine's work was highly appreciated by Tsar Nicholas II, who awarded her the Cross with Ornaments in 1900. His wife, Alexandra Feodorovna, also supported the monastery in Leśna. With her backing, nuns from Leśna who received their spiritual formation under Hegumenia Catherine – Athanasya Gromyeko, Anna Potto, and Helena Konovalova – founded several other monasteries following a similar rule: the Monastery of Christ the Savior in Wirów, the Monastery of Saint Anthony in Radecznica, the Monastery of the Nativity of the Mother of God in Różanystok, and the Monastery of the Transfiguration in Teolin. The imperial couple made two pilgrimages to Leśna, and during their second visit in 1900, Hegumenia Catherine commemorated their stay by building a chapel in Biała Podlaska.

Hegumenia Catherine's spiritual authority and aristocratic background made her an influential figure at the court of the last Tsar of Russia. In 1898, she used her position to ensure the removal of Auxiliary Bishop Tikhon from the Eparchy of Chełm and Warsaw. The bishop had previously conducted a canonical visitation to the monastery in Leśna and gave a negative report on the hegumenia's activities, accusing her of mismanagement (the monastery was constantly in debt). As a result, Bishop Tikhon was sent to work in North America (Aleutian and Alaskan Eparchy), and Archbishop Flavian of Chełm and Warsaw, his protector, was transferred to the position of Exarch of Georgia. Hegumenia Catherine frequently traveled to Saint Petersburg to petition for additional financial support for the monastery, and she usually obtained assistance from the state or private donors.

In the spring of 1905, Hegumenia Catherine traveled to Saint Petersburg with Bishop Eulogius of Lublin to report to Konstantin Pobedonostsev, the Chief Procurator of the Most Holy Synod, Interior Minister Alexander Bulygin, and the Tsar about the detrimental effects of the Edict of Toleration on Orthodoxy (approximately 180,000 former Uniates in Chełm Land had converted to Latin-rite Catholicism) and to ask for assistance for the church structures in Chełm Land. Her influence at court allowed the delegation to secure multiple audiences with Nicholas II, who, impressed by Eulogius' arguments, recognized the necessity of creating an independent Chełm Eparchy.

==== "Second Hegumenia". Emigration ====
In 1907, Hegumenia Catherine underwent a leg amputation due to the reopening of old burn wounds. As a result, she intended to retire and remain in Leśna as a monk. She entrusted the management of the monastery to her close collaborator, the monastery's steward, Sister Nina. However, she ultimately continued to co-manage the monastery with Nina until the end of her life, being referred to as "the second hegumenia". By 1915, the Leśna Monastery had become a significant local economic and educational center.

On 31 July 1915, together with the entire monastic community, she was evacuated from Leśna (as part of the mass emigration). The monastery buildings were taken over by the Russian army. Some nuns, along with the orphanage's wards, went to the Monastery of St. Seraphim in Ponetajewka in Nizhny Novgorod Governorate. Hegumenia Catherine, Hegumenia Nina, and around 140 nuns and novices decided to settle in Petrograd at the branch of their monastery, the Voskresensky Novodevichy monastery, as well as at the Ioannovsky Convent. In mid-August 1917, Archbishop Anastasius of Chișinău, the former ordinary of the Chełm Diocese, invited the nuns from Leśna to his diocese. Hegumenias Catherine and Nina, along with 70 women, arrived at the Japca Monastery on the Dniester river. After the annexation of Bessarabia to Romania and the subsequent inclusion of the Diocese of Chișinău into the Romanian Orthodox Church, the nuns were ordered to accept Romanian citizenship and introduce the Romanian language into the monastery's services. Disagreeing with these terms and fearing that the Romanian Church would adopt the new calendar style (the Revised Julian calendar), Hegumenias Catherine and Nina decided to accept an invitation from King Alexander and settle in the Kingdom of Serbs, Croats, and Slovenes. However, some nuns chose to remain at the Japca Monastery.

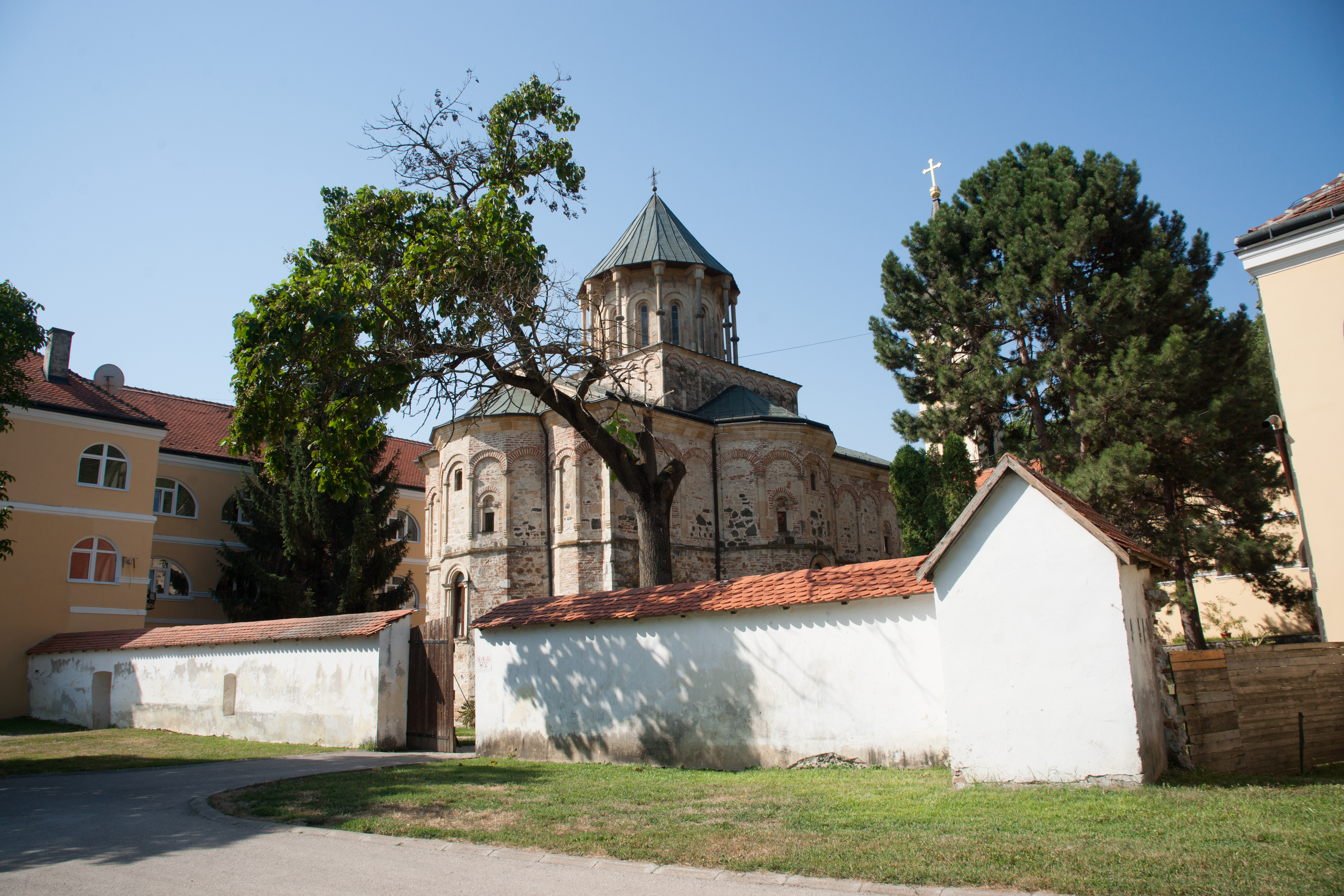
Novo Hopovo Monastery

In 1920, Hegumenia Catherine, along with 62 nuns and novices, arrived in Belgrade on a barge funded by King Alexander. Bishop Dositej of Niš provided them with accommodation at Kuveždin Monastery on Fruška Gora. After a few months, the nuns moved to another monastery in the Fruška Gora complex, reviving the inactive male Novo Hopovo Monastery. This monastery became one of the centers of religious life for the Russian White émigré community in Yugoslavia. At the same time, in addition to Russian women, Serbian women were also accepted as novices. However, due to limited financial resources, the monastery's social activities could not continue on the same scale as before, despite the efforts of both Hegumenias. The nuns' primary charitable work became an orphanage, which housed mainly abandoned or orphaned children of Russian émigrés. The nuns of Novo Hopovo also contributed to the revival of female monasticism in the Serbian Orthodox Church by promoting the model of the "active monastery" and establishing new communities. In this context, the first Serbian female monastic community since the Middle Ages was established, occupying the building of Kuveždin Monastery. Its superior became Hegumenia Melania Krivokućin, who had received her spiritual formation at Novo Hopovo.

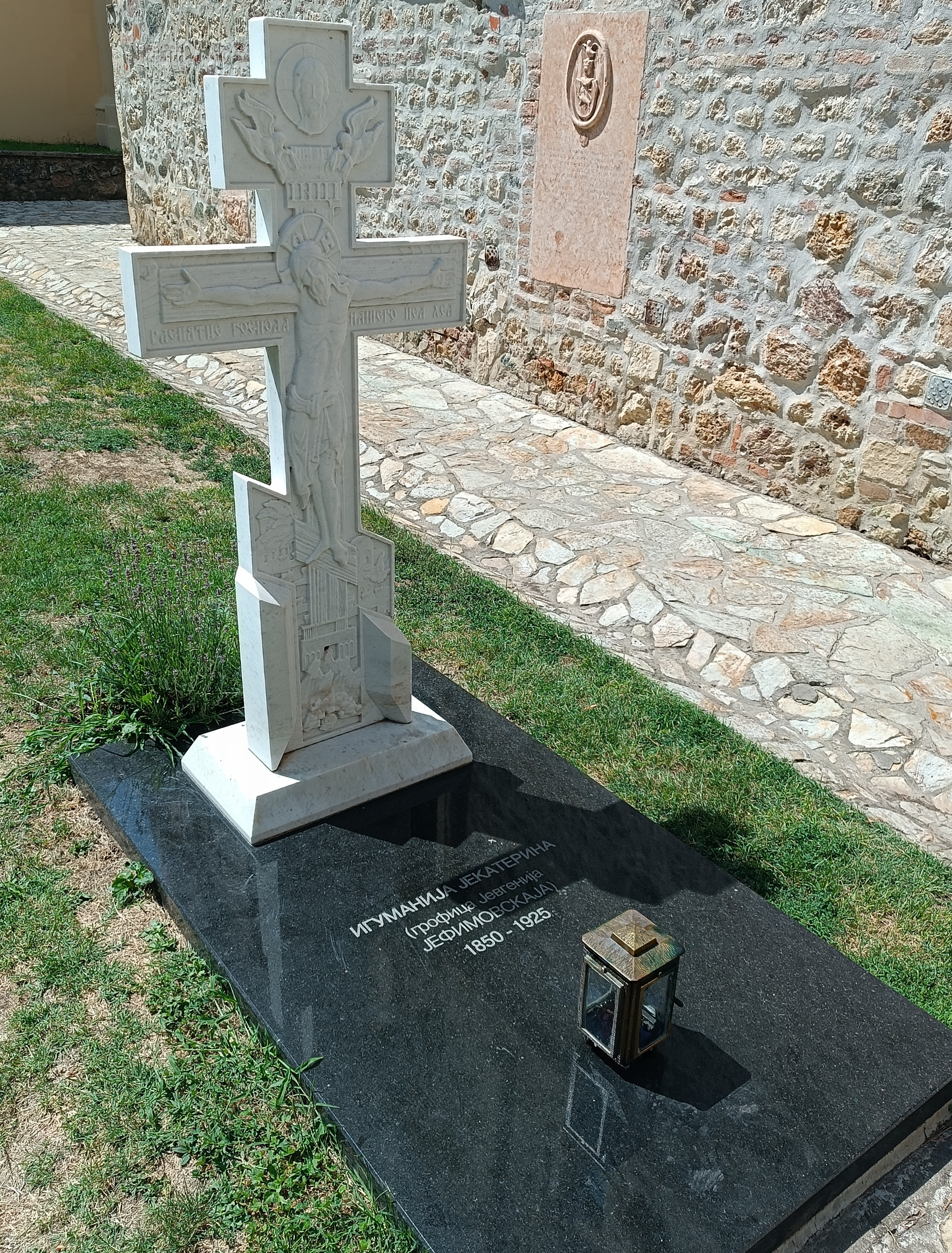
The gravestone on her grave

In 1923, Hegumenia Catherine hosted King Alexander I at the monastery, and in September 1925, the monastery held the third Congress of the Russian Christian Student Movement, which was honorably chaired by the First Hierarch of the Russian Orthodox Church Outside of Russia, Metropolitan Antony. Hegumenia Catherine played an active role in the congress. Shortly after its conclusion, she died. Her funeral, held on November 1 of that year, was led by Bishop Maximilian of Srem, assisted by a group of Serbian priests and a single Russian cleric, Father Alexey Nelyubov. She was buried in the monastery cemetery.

Her original tomb was destroyed during World War II, when the entire monastery was burned down and abandoned. The burial site was rediscovered in the 1980s, thanks to the initiative of Archimandrite Dositej, superior of Grgeteg Monastery. In 1985, Archbishop Antony of Geneva and Western Europe (under the jurisdiction of the Russian Orthodox Church Outside of Russia) funded a marble tombstone for Hegumenia Catherine's grave.

== Literary works and theological studies ==
While still a layperson, Yevgeniya Yefimovskaya wrote poems and short stories, which she sent for publication in literary magazines. Over time, she shifted her focus primarily to theology, continuing her independent studies in this field even while serving as the superior of the Leśna Monastery. She also authored her own theological articles. The most well-known of these was a study on the ministry of female deacons in the early centuries of Christianity, which she published in the journal Christianin in 1908 and 1909. She also published the work Monastyr' i christianskij asketizm.

Yefimovskaya advocated for the introduction of the female deacon ministry into the Russian Orthodox Church following the early Christian model. In her view, this could encourage educated women to take active roles in serving the church. Her proposals on this issue were discussed at a meeting ahead of the planned Local Council in 1906, which was ultimately never convened due to the opposition of Tsar Nicholas II.

== Veneration ==
The veneration of Hegumenia Catherine emerged in the 1980s within the Russian Orthodox Church Outside Russia. According to Archimandrite Dositeus, when Catherine's body was found during the process of locating her burial site, it was discovered to be incorrupt, which, according to Orthodox tradition, could be a sign of sainthood. At that time, her first life account, troparion, kontakion, and akathist were composed in her honor. In 1993, after reading Catherine's letters, Metropolitan Vitaly, the First Hierarch of the Russian Orthodox Church Outside Russia, considered her canonization.

Ultimately, however, Hegumenia Catherine was only recognized as The Venerable within the non-canonical Russian True Orthodox Church. This was because the nuns of the Monastery of the Leśna Icon of the Mother of God in Chavincourt-Provemont, which continued the traditions of the communities in Leśna and Novo Hopovo, had transferred to its jurisdiction in opposition to the union of the Church Abroad with the Moscow Patriarchate. Her canonization, unrecognized by canonical Orthodox churches, took place in 2010.

== Bibliography ==
- Pawluczuk, U. (2007). Życie monastyczne w II Rzeczypospolitej [Monastic Life in the Second Polish Republic] (in Polish). Białystok: Wydawnictwo Uniwersytetu w Białymstoku. ISBN 978-83-7431-127-4.
