= Ligovsky Canal =

Canal in Russia

Coordinates: 59.8585°N 30.29°E

Ligovsky canal Russian: Лиговский канал
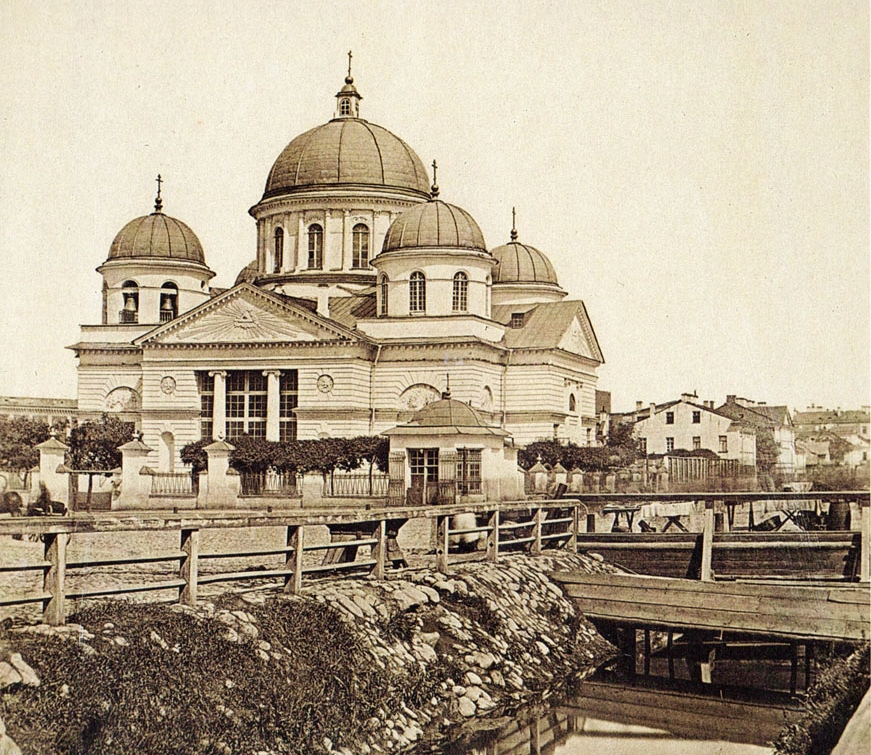
- The Ligovsky canal near Znamenskaya Church. 1860s
- Interactive map of Ligovsky canal Russian: Лиговский канал

Specifications
- Maximum height AMSL: 78.9 ft (24.0 m) (Difference between a mouth and a source in meter)
- Status: 90 % closed

History
- Principal engineer: G. Skornyakov-Pisarev
- Construction began: 1718
- Date completed: 1721
- Date closed: 1891, 1926 and 1965-1969

The Ligovsky Canal (Russian: Ли́говский кана́л) is one of the longest canals of Saint Petersburg (Russia). Constructed in 1721, it is 23 kilometres (14 mi) long. Its purpose was to supply water for the fountains of the Summer Garden. The canal delivered water from the river to ponds on the current Nekrasov Street.

== History ==
The idea of constructing the canal came from the Russian tsar and reformer Peter I. He decided to decorate the Summer Garden with fountains supplied by water delivered by gravity feed. A small river, Liga (now called the Dudergofka), near (Dudergofskoye Lake), became the source of the water. The project's designer was G. Skornyakov-Pisarev, who also supervised the canal's construction.

Except for the basic function of activating the fountains, the canal was used as a water main and as a defensive boundary, protecting the capital from the southeast. The project was completed in three years, 1718–21. It is known that the canal had at least two bridges, one at Moskovsky Prospekt and one at Znamenskya Square (from a contemporary photo). Later when the Obvodny Canal was built at the beginning of the 20th century, Yamskoi Vodoprovodniy Aqueduct was built by Russian engineer Ivan Gerard. Later a bridge over Leninsky Prospekt was constructed. Details of its dismantling are not extant. It is probable it was demolished together with the canal and has remained underground.

The flooding of 21 September [O.S. 10 September] 1777 destroyed the fountains of the Summer Garden and the reason for the canal disappeared. In addition, the water in the canal became muddy and undrinkable. The canal gradually became unfit for use and was gradually filled in:

- In 1891–92, the site from the Tauride Garden to Obvodny Canal was filled in. Yamskoi Vodoprovodniy Aqueduct was reconstructed in 1895 and was renamed Novo-kamenniy bridge. Granite basins by the bridge existed before the beginning 20th century, when they were dismantled as superfluous.
- In 1926, the site from Obvodny Canal to Moskovsky Prospekt was filled in
- In 1965–69, waters of the canal were lowered in Krasnenkaya River, and the canal was truncated before crossing Krasnoputilovskaya street.

In its place, Ligovsky Avenue was laid out.

== Present system ==
Near to a railway line the Liga canal waters go underground and come to the surface near the Krasnenkaya River. There the canal is divided into two channels: the majority of the canal waters are carried away by the Krasnenkaya River, the smaller branch goes underground and exits into the ponds of the Aviatorov Garden. The length of the remaining part is 11 kilometres (7 mi).

in 1834–38 on the bank of the canal the Moscow Triumphal Gate was constructed. It was built mainly in cast iron.

The filled in Ligovsky Canal became a hindrance to the subsequent construction of a metro station Ploshchad Vosstaniya - a wet stratum greatly complicated works. They were overcome, applying a caisson with an hydrochloric solution in 1950.
