= Moskovsky Avenue (disambiguation) =

Moskovsky Avenue is a street in Saint Petersburg, Russia.

Moskovsky Avenue, Moscow Avenue , or Moskovsky Prospekt (Russian: Московский проспект) may also refer to the following streets:

- ru:Московский проспект (Чебоксары), Cheboksary
- ru:Московский проспект (Калининград), Kaliningrad
- ru:Московский проспект (Набережные Челны), Naberezhnye Chelny
- ru:Московский проспект (Воронеж), Voronezh
- ru:Московский проспект (Выборг), Vyborg
- ru:Московский проспект (Ярославль), Yaroslavl
- ru:Московский проспект (Зеленоград), Zelenograd

== See also ==
- ro:Bulevardul Moscova din Chișinău
- Moscow Bridge (disambiguation)
- Moscow Highway (disambiguation)
- Moscow Square (disambiguation)
- Moscow Street (disambiguation)
