= Novo-Kamenny Bridge =

Bridge in Saint Petersburg, Russia

Novo-Kamenny Bridge Ново-Каменный мост
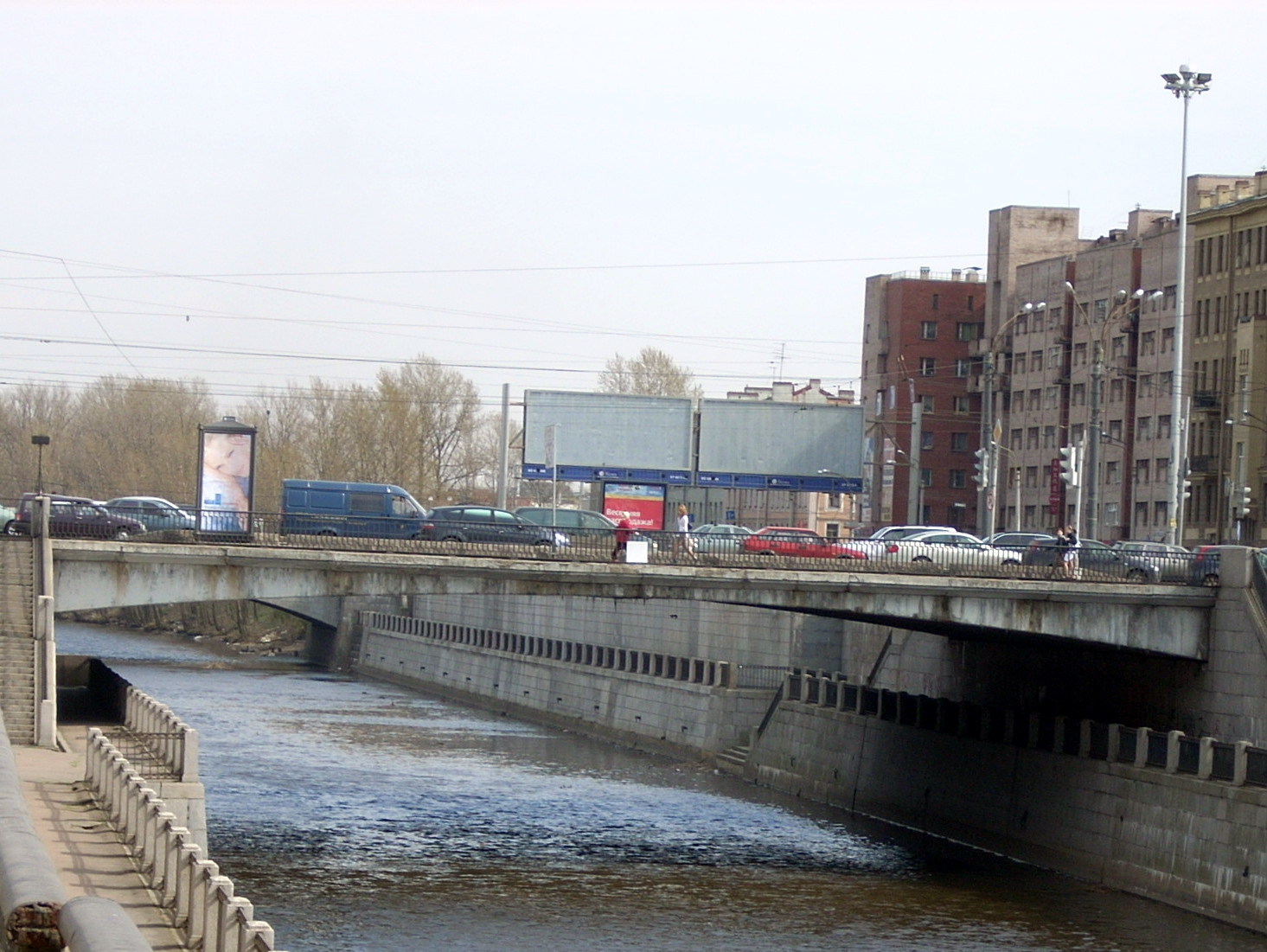
- Coordinates: 59°54′54″N 30°21′02″E
- Carries: Vehicles, trams and pedestrians
- Crosses: Obvodny Canal
- Locale: Saint Petersburg, Russian Federation

Characteristics
- Design: Beam (Gerard, Guttsajt); arch (Bazaine, Erakov)
- Material: Wood (Gerard); granite (Bazaine); brick and stone (Erakov); reinforced concrete (Guttsajt)
- Total length: 25.6 m (Bazaine); 42.7 m (Erakov); 38.2 m (Guttsajt)
- Width: 14 m (Erakov); 44.8 m (Guttsajt)

History
- Designer: Gerard (1800s); Bazaine (1816–1821); Erakov (1846–1848); Guttsajt (1967–1970)
- Opened: 1821 (Bazaine); 1848 (Bazaine); 1970 (Guttsajt)

Location
- Interactive map of Novo-Kamenny Bridge

Novo-Kamenny Bridge (Russian: Ново-Каменный мост) is a crossing of the Obvodny Canal in Saint Petersburg, Russia. The bridge forms part of Ligovsky Avenue and connects Bezimyanni Island with the Tsentralny and Frunzensky districts of the city.

== History ==
=== 'Gerard' bridge ===
The first bridge to be built was constructed at the end of the 18th century; construction was supervised by engineer Ivan Gerard. The 'Gerard' bridge replaced a wooden beam aqueduct built to carry the Ligovsky Canal—the Yamskoi Vodoprovodny Aqueduct—though the Ligovsky Canal was filled-in in the 1890s; the 'Gerard' bridge occupied the alignment of the filled-in canal.

=== 'Bazaine' bridge ===
After having problems with decay and levels of passenger traffic, the 'Gerard' bridge was replaced. Engineer Pierre-Dominique Bazaine supervised the construction of the second bridge on the current bridge's site, which took place between 1816 and 1821.

=== 'Erakov' bridge ===
A third bridge was constructed between 1846 and 1848 under the direction of engineer A. N. Erakov. The 'Erakov' bridge featured granite pools for drinking from, with the water being sourced from the Ligovsky Canal. The 'Erakov' bridge was repaired and reconstructed in 1862, 1872 and 1874—though changes were not made to the bridge's design or general appearance.

=== Current ('Guttsajt') bridge ===
With intensive building in southern areas of (the then) Leningrad in the 1950s, Ligovsky Avenue and the roads around Obvodny Canal Quay became congested. The 14 metre-wide 'Erakov' bridge—built in 1848—was too narrow to cope with the volume of traffic using it and, thus, a decision was taken to substantially widen the bridge.

The current bridge was designed by architect Lev Noskov and was constructed between 1968 and 1970, developed by engineers N. P. Agapov and Aron Guttsayt. The 'Guttsajt' bridge was substantially wider than its predecessor—at just under 45 metres in width—and was opened to public use on November 7, 1970.

== Gallery ==
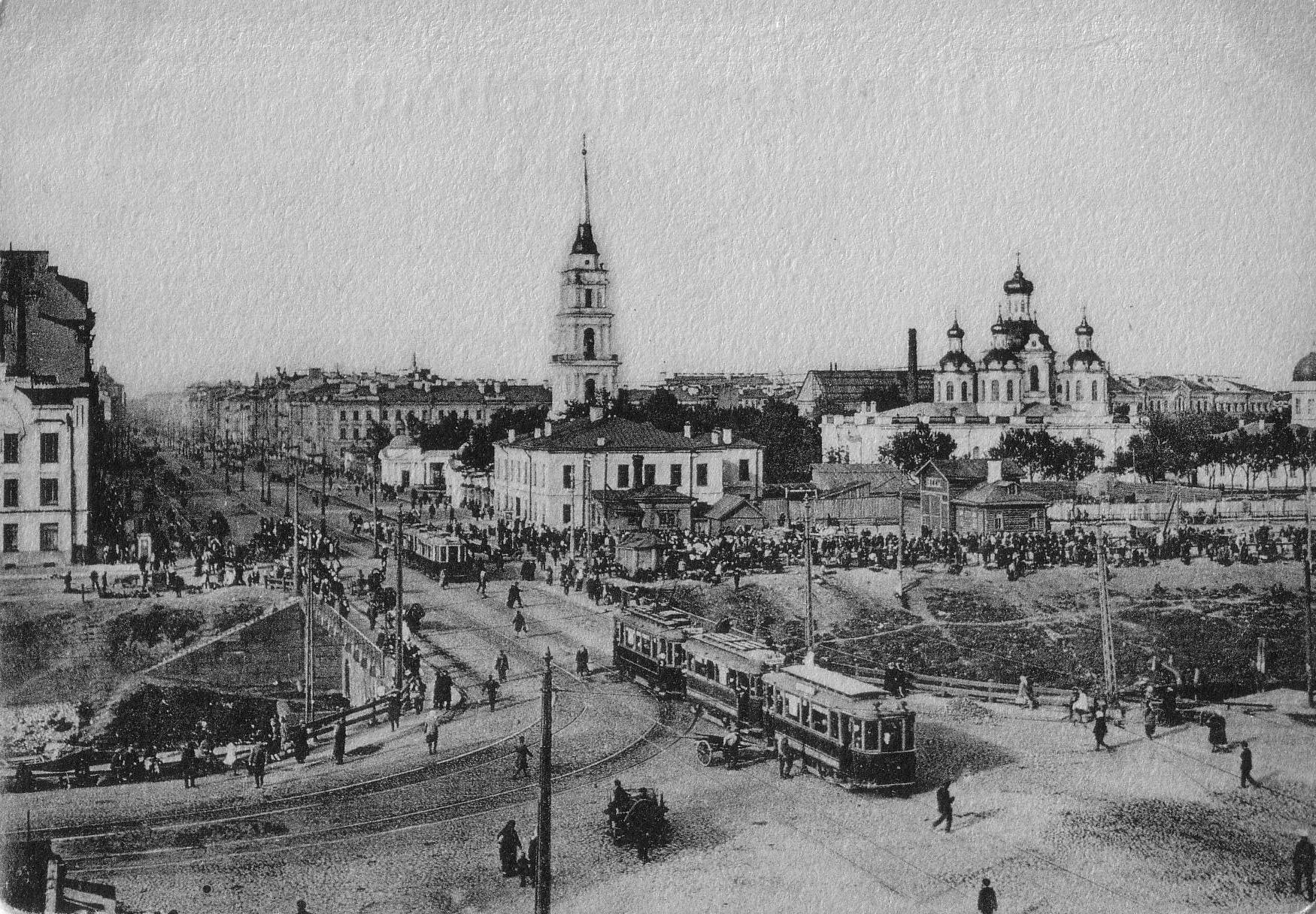
'Erakov' bridge under construction; note the lack of the Ligovsky Canаl
