= Skornyakov =

Skornyakov, Skorniakov (Russian: Скорняков; feminine: Skornyakova, Skorniakova) is a Russian occupational surname, a patronymic derivation from the occupation of skornyak, furrier. The surname may refer to the following notable people:

- Aleksei Skornyakov (born 1993), Russian football player
- Eduard Skornyakov (born 1980), Russian sailor
- Grigory Skornyakov-Pisarev, 18th century Russian educator and statesman
- Roman Skorniakov (born 1976), Russian-born figure skater
