= Novodevichy =

Novodevichy may refer to:

- Novodevichy Cemetery, Moscow
- Novodevichy Cemetery (Saint Petersburg)
- Novodevichy Convent, Moscow
