= Novodevichy Convent (Saint Petersburg) =

Russian Orthodox monastery in St. Petersburg

Voskresensky Novodevichy monastery
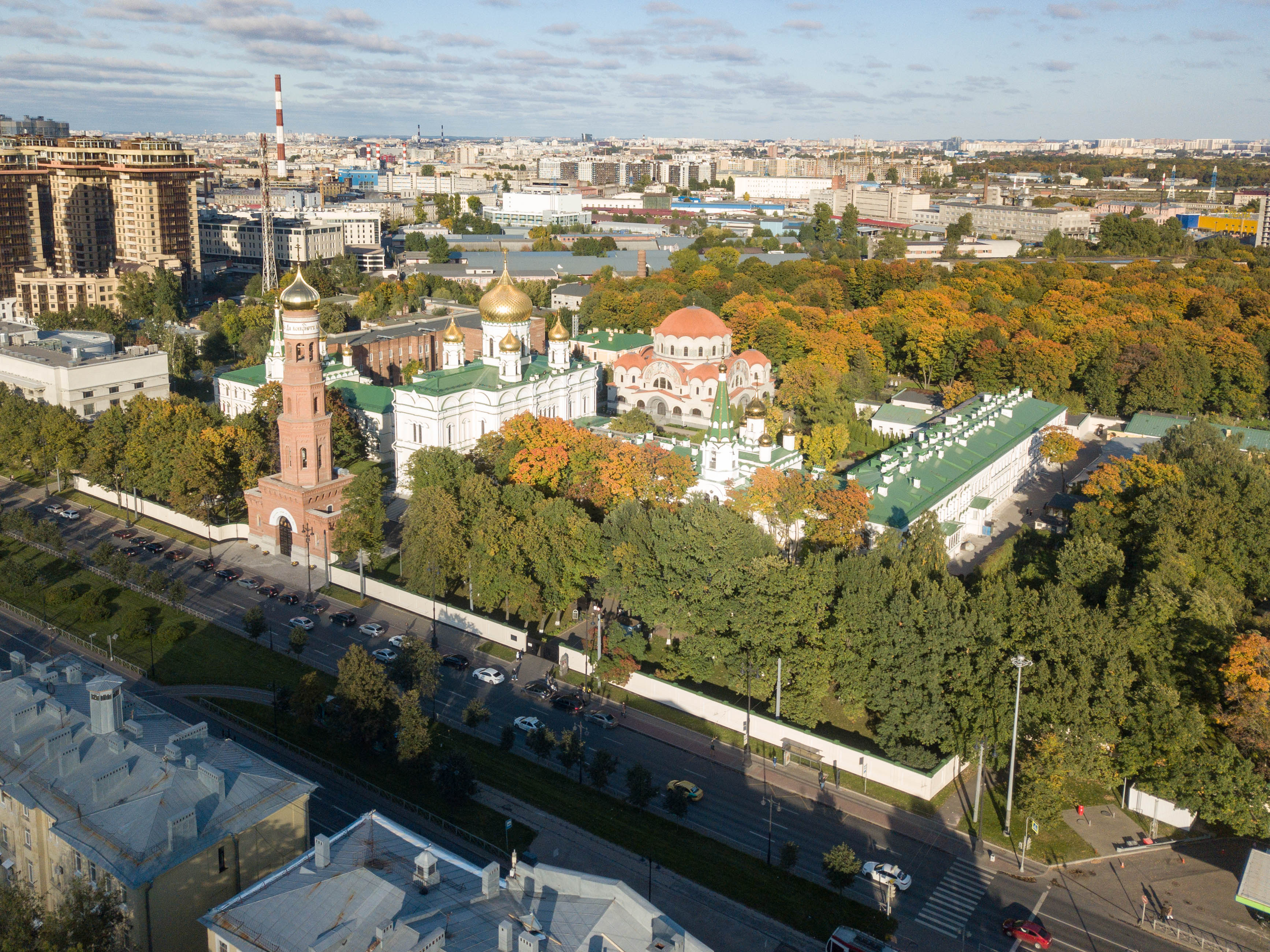
- Interactive map of Voskresensky Novodevichy monastery

People
- Founder: Elizaveta Petrovna (resumed by Nicholas I)

Site
- Country: Russia
- Coordinates: 59.8985°N 30.3214°E

Voskresensky Novodevichy monastery in St. Petersburg, Russia, is a convent of the St. Petersburg diocese of the Russian Orthodox Church near the Moscow outpost at 100 Moskovsky Prospekt.

== History of the monastery ==
=== Predecessors ===
Initially, the Voskresensky Monastery for Women was supposed to be built on the site of the Smolny Yard on the Neva. October 30 (November 10), 1748, by decree of Empress Elizabeth Petrovna, the Smolny maiden monastery was founded. However, the construction of the monastery was delayed due to the ongoing Seven Years' War. Only in 1764 the abbess and five nuns were appointed here. The monastery ceased to exist in 1822, when not a single nun remained in it.

The first-class convent in St. Petersburg was renewed on March 14 (26), 1845 by decree of Nicholas I. The nuns were placed on Vasilyevsky Island in the former house of the abolished Greek Uniate Theological College. And services for them were performed in the lower church of the neighboring Church of the Annunciation.

=== From foundation to liquidation ===
The place on Vasilyevsky Island did not suit the nuns. In this regard, a state-owned forest area near the Moscow Gates was allocated for the monastery. Here Metropolitan Nikanor (Klementievsky) on November 15, 1849, laid the foundation stone for the monastery. The first brick was laid by Emperor Nicholas I. A cemetery was also founded here 4 years before. The first abbess of the monastery was Theophania (Gotovtsova).

The construction of the complex was carried out according to the project of the architect N. E. Efimov, with the participation of K. I. Reimers, L. L. Bonshtedt and N. A. Sychev. Among the donors were Countess A. A. Orlova-Chesmenskaya and Queen Olga Nikolaevna of Württemberg. In addition, the treasury allocated 25,000 rubles annually for the construction of the monastery.

In 1854, the nuns moved into the rebuilt complex.

After the foundation, various workshops operated at the monastery: icon painting, drawing, chasing, gold embroidery, carpet, shoe, prosphora, a cookery, a kvass factory, farms, vegetable gardens, orchards, a bee-keeper appeared. In 1901, buildings were built in the monastery, which housed a refectory, sacristy, library, hospital, etc. An orphanage, an almshouse and the parochial Prince Vladimir school began to operate at the monastery.

By 1917, 77 nuns and 66 novices lived in the monastery. Four times a year (on the anniversary of the founding of the monastery, the day of All Saints, the celebration of the Kazan Icon of the Mother of God and the Assumption of the Most Holy Theotokos), a religious procession was organized around the monastery.

In January 1883, the Novodevichy Convent was donated 6.5 acres of forest in the village of Vokhonovo, Tsarskoye Selo District, to build a skete. It was established in 1884, but already in 1889 the Mariinsky Skete was turned into a cenobitic provincial monastery.

=== Soviet period ===
In 1918, the monastery was abolished, but continued to exist on an ad hoc basis. Property and church valuables were confiscated. At the end of 1919, the monastics created a labor community around the parish of the Resurrection Cathedral.

In 1928–1937, the abbot's quarters of the monastery served as the residence of the metropolitans of Leningrad. Before the eyes of Metropolitan Seraphim, in 1929–1932 the main cathedral and all the churches of the monastery were closed, except for the one at which the metropolitan's residence was located, the monastery bell tower was demolished; in February 1932, about 90 nuns and novices who lived in the monastery buildings were arrested and deported.

At the end of 1937, church life in the monastery completely ceased – the last functioning Athos church was closed, the residence of the metropolitan was confiscated.

=== Post-soviet time ===
Since 1990, the gradual restoration of the monastery began. In 1989, the Kazan Church was transferred to the ROCOR parish. In November 1995, the monastery was legally renewed. By this time, the nuns had again found the grave of Mother Superior Theophania, located between the Kazan Church and the apse of the Resurrection Cathedral, in Soviet times it was desecrated and was under asphalt for a long time. At the time of the restoration of the monastery, three neglected dilapidated outbuildings were transferred to it. In one of them cells were placed, in the other two – a refectory, an almshouse, a library, and workshops. However, most of the buildings continued to house the Research Institute of Electrical Engineering. In the summer of 2001, the Prince-Vladimir parochial school was given to the monastery, and in the autumn of the same year it was decided to return to the monastery all the buildings that had ever belonged to it. Parishioners of the Moscow Cathedral of Christ the Savior donated to the monastery an image of the Reigning Icon of the Mother of God. Since 2002, restoration work began in the Kazan Church and the southern building, the reconstruction of the Resurrection Cathedral and the Athos Church. At the moment, the domes of both of these churches have been restored, the Athos Church has been completely recreated and operates, like the southern monastery building, while restoration is underway in the Resurrection Cathedral, most of which has already been completed. The Kazan Church has also been completely restored. The restoration of the northern building has not yet begun, the Church of the Three Saints still stands without domes. Reconstruction of this building was planned to begin in 2008.

The ensemble of the Resurrection Novodevichy Convent again began to amaze the eye of the observer with its magnificence. The issue of restoring the St. Isidore bell tower has not been resolved. Instead, despite public protests against changing the "high-rise regulations" (that is, the height limit for buildings that was observed until the end of the 20th century), the development of the area for elite high-rise buildings behind the monastery began. Against the backdrop of high-rise buildings with elite expensive housing under construction since 2007 near the monastery, the Voskresensky Novodevichy Convent in St. Petersburg has lost its majesty even more.

From October 20 to 24, 2011, the Belt of the Virgin from the Vatoped monastery on Athos stayed in the monastery. In this regard, many kilometers of queues began to appear at the entrance to the monastery along Moskovsky Prospekt and Kievskaya Street, access to the Kazan Church was around the clock. From January 14 to 17, 2014, the gifts of the Magi from the Athos Monastery of St. Paul stayed in the monastery. Believers stood in line for 8–10 hours to touch the shrine.

== Abbesses ==
1845–1866 – Abbess Feofaniya (Gotovtsova)

1866–1886 – Abbess Evstoliya (Erofeeva)

1887 – viceroy, nun Apollonia, treasurer[6]

1888–1904 – Abbess Valentina (Ivanovskaya)

1904–1916 – Abbess Anthony (Reinboat)

1918–1935 – Abbess Theophania (Rentel)

Since 2007 – Abbess Sophia (Silina)

== Novodevichy cemetery ==
The Novodevichy cemetery on the territory of the monastery was founded in 1845, even before the resumption of the monastery itself. It is located in the eastern part of the monastery. Many famous people are buried there: poets N. A. Nekrasov, F. I. Tyutchev, A. N. Maikov, artists M. A. Vrubel and A. Ya. Golovin, doctor S. P. Botkin and many others. The architect of the monastery N. E. Efimov himself is also buried here.

Not far from the monastery, at the apse of the former house church of the St. Vladimir Women's Church Teachers' School, there is the grave of the Chief Prosecutor of the Holy Synod K. P. Pobedonostsev, who was buried there according to his will in 1907, as well as his wife, who died in Leningrad in 1932 year.
