= Novodevichy Cemetery (Saint Petersburg) =

Cemetery in Saint Petersburg, Russia

Coordinates: 59.898°N 30.325°E

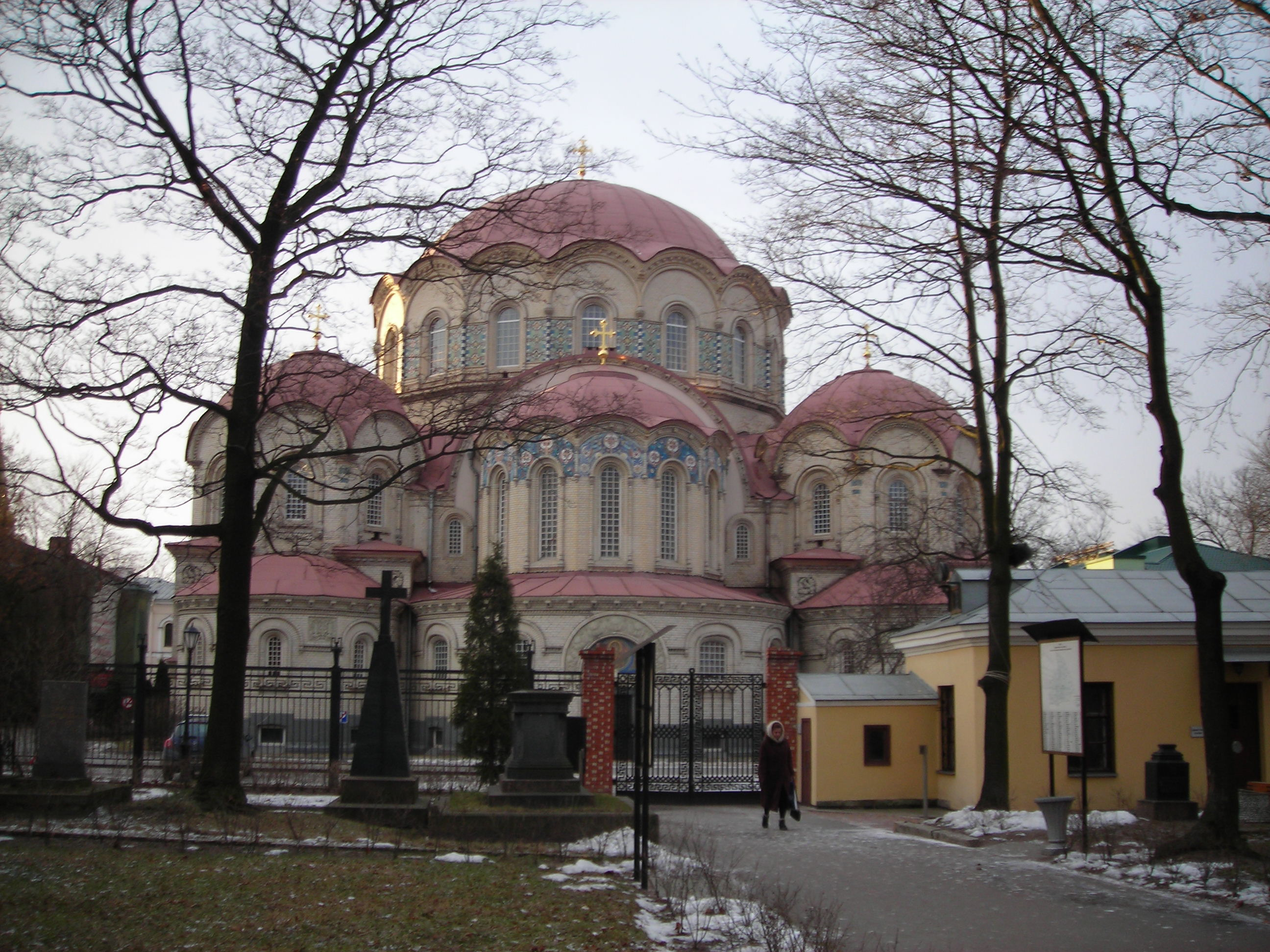
Exit out of the Novodevichy Cemetery.

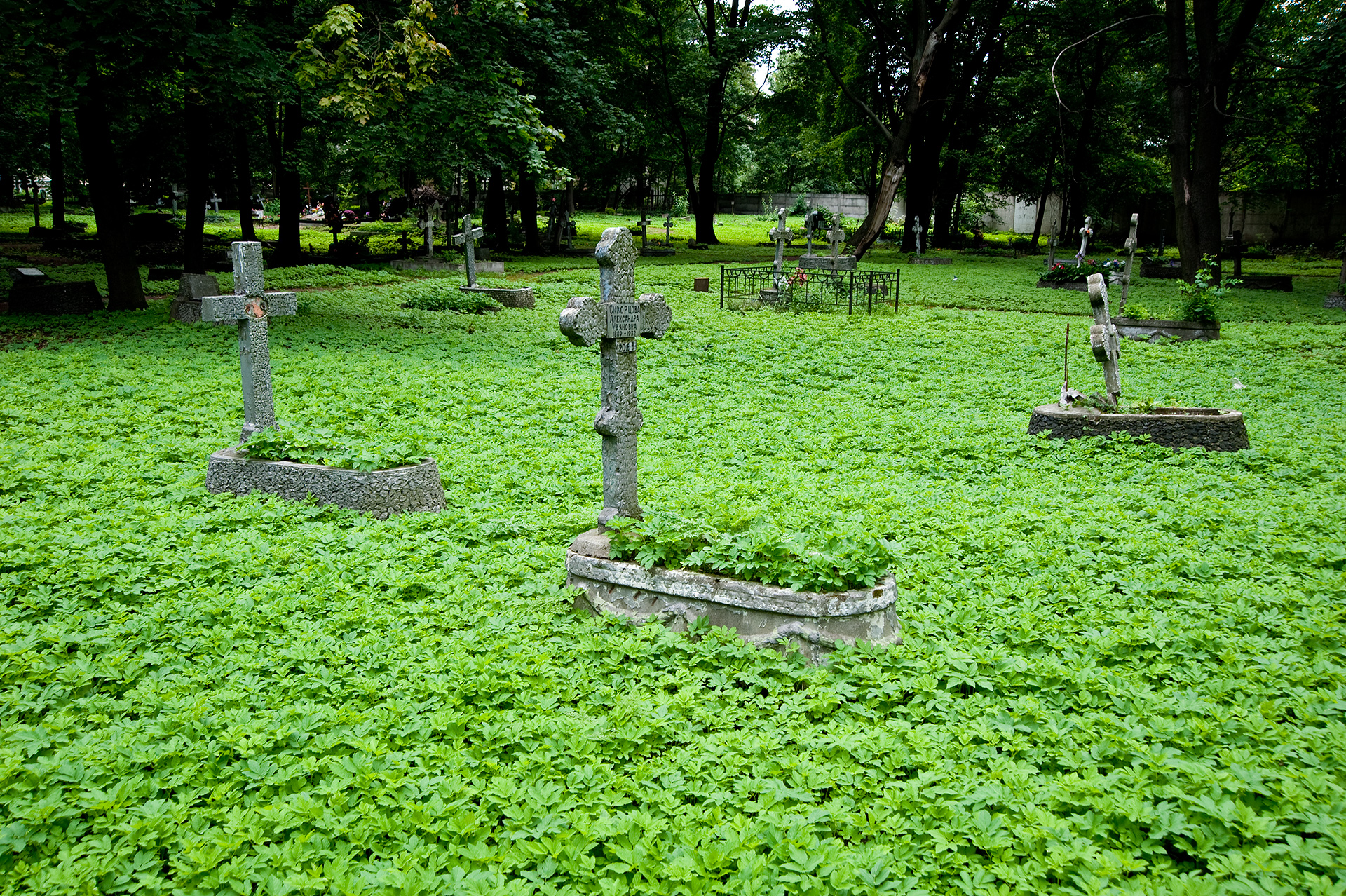
Old tombstones

Novodevichy Cemetery (Russian: Новодевичье кладбище) in Saint Petersburg is a historic cemetery in the south-west part of the city near the Moscow Triumphal Gate. The cemetery is named after the historical Resurrection (Novodevichy) Convent. In the 19th century it was the second most prestigious cemetery after the Tikhvin Cemetery in the Alexander Nevsky Monastery.

== History ==
The cemetery started in 1845 when the Smolny Convent was moved to this location. The first burials date to 1849. In the 1920s and 1930s, the cemetery church was demolished by the Soviet authorities (1929) and many tombs were destroyed, while other burials were transferred to the Tikhvin Cemetery. In 1989, major restoration work was carried out at the cemetery.

Notable people formerly interred at the Novodevichy Cemetery include the poets Nikolay Nekrasov and Fyodor Tyutchev, the painter Mikhail Vrubel, the architect Leonty Benois, the composer Nikolai Rimsky-Korsakov, the philologist Yakov Grot, the publisher A. F. Marx, the chess-player Mikhail Chigorin, the politician Vyacheslav Pleve and the explorer Gennady Nevelskoi.

Many people (even Petersburgers) confuse the cemetery with the Novodevichy Cemetery at the Novodevichy Convent in Moscow.

== Temples ==
Church of the Icon of the Mother of God "Joy of All Who Sorrow" (1855–1856, architect E. I. Zhiber) – the temple is dedicated to the memory of the commander of the Alexandria Hussars, Colonel A. N. Karamzin, son of the famous historian Nikolai Karamzin.

Church of Elijah the Prophet (1883–1888, architect L. N. Benois;) – the tomb of the merchant I. F. Gromov, a five-domed church, lined with glazed brick on the outside.
