= Novo Hopovo Monastery =

Monastery in Irig, Serbia

Coordinates: 45°07′42″N 19°50′47″E

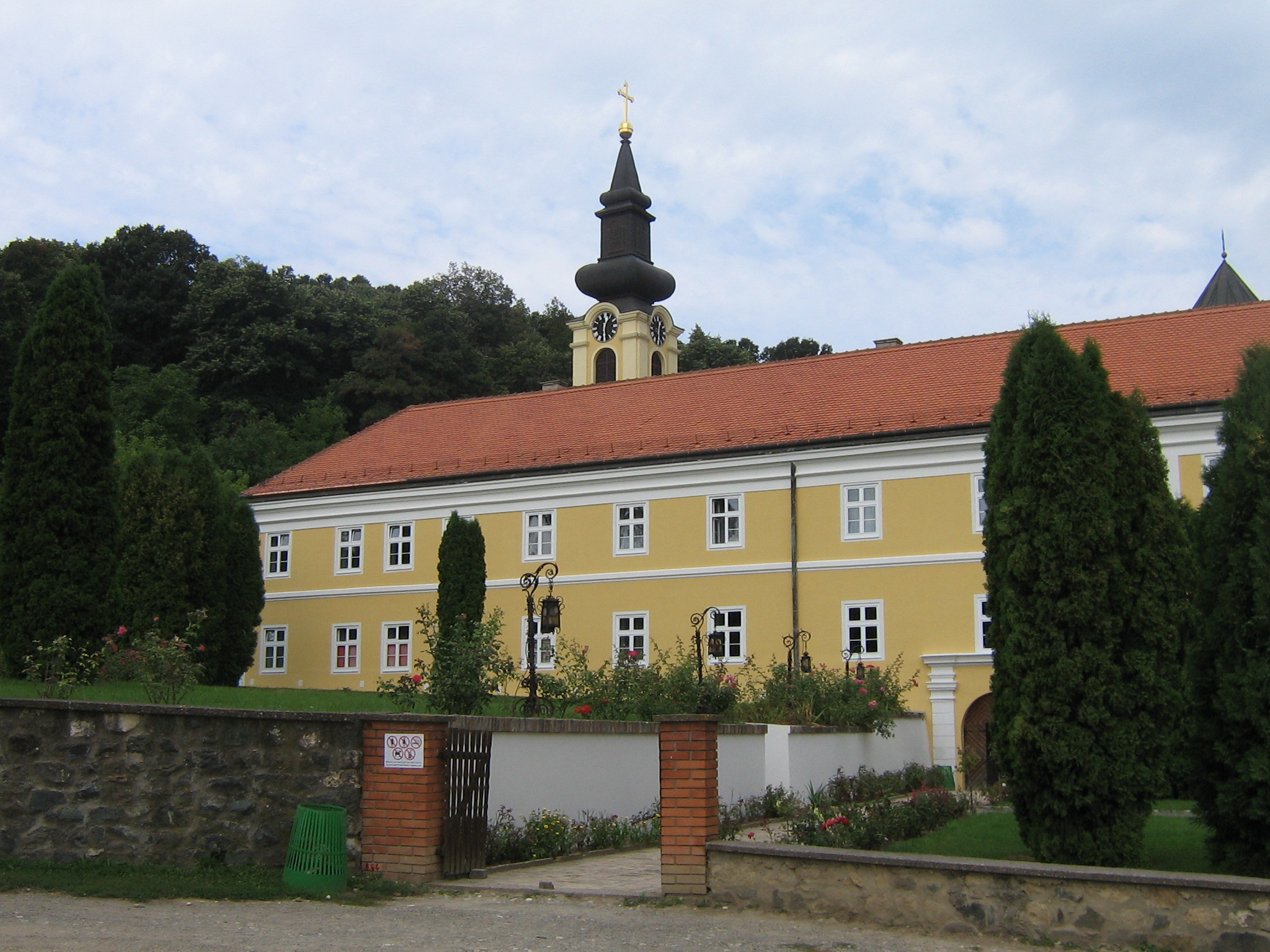
Novo Hopovo monastery

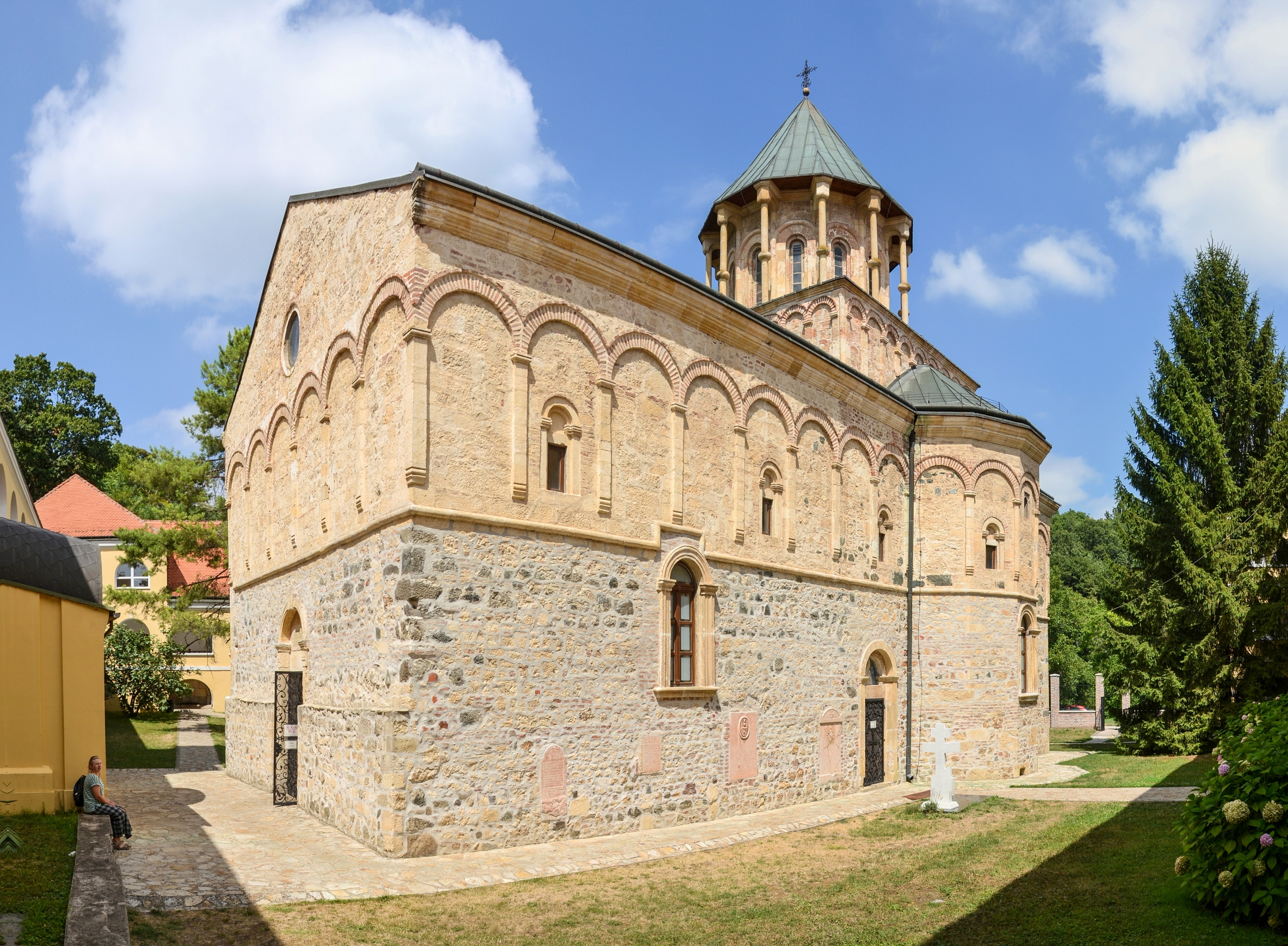
Church in Novo Hopovo monastery

The Novo Hopovo Monastery (Serbian: Манастир Ново Хопово, romanized: Manastir Novo Hopovo) is a Serb Orthodox monastery on the Fruška Gora mountain in northern Serbia, in the province of Vojvodina. According to tradition, the monastery was built by the Despots of the House of Branković. The first written mention of the monastery was made in 1451, and the latest mention of the monastery dates back to 1641. The extant church was erected in 1576 and the bell-tower with the small St. Stephen's Chapel upstairs was built between 1751 and 1758. The monastic residences were constructed in several stages, from 1728 until 1771. The icons were painted in 1776 by Teodor Kračun.

The Novo Hopovo Monastery was declared Monument of Culture of Exceptional Importance in 1990, and it is protected by the state.

== See also ==
- List of Serbian Orthodox monasteries
