= Moscow Highway =

Moscow Highway may refer to:

- M10 highway (Russia), highway Moscow-St.Petersburg
- Moscow Highway, Belarus, highway Minsk-Moscow
