= Moscow Triumphal Gate =

Neoclassical triumphal arch in Saint Petersburg, Russia

Coordinates: 59.8914°N 30.3194°E

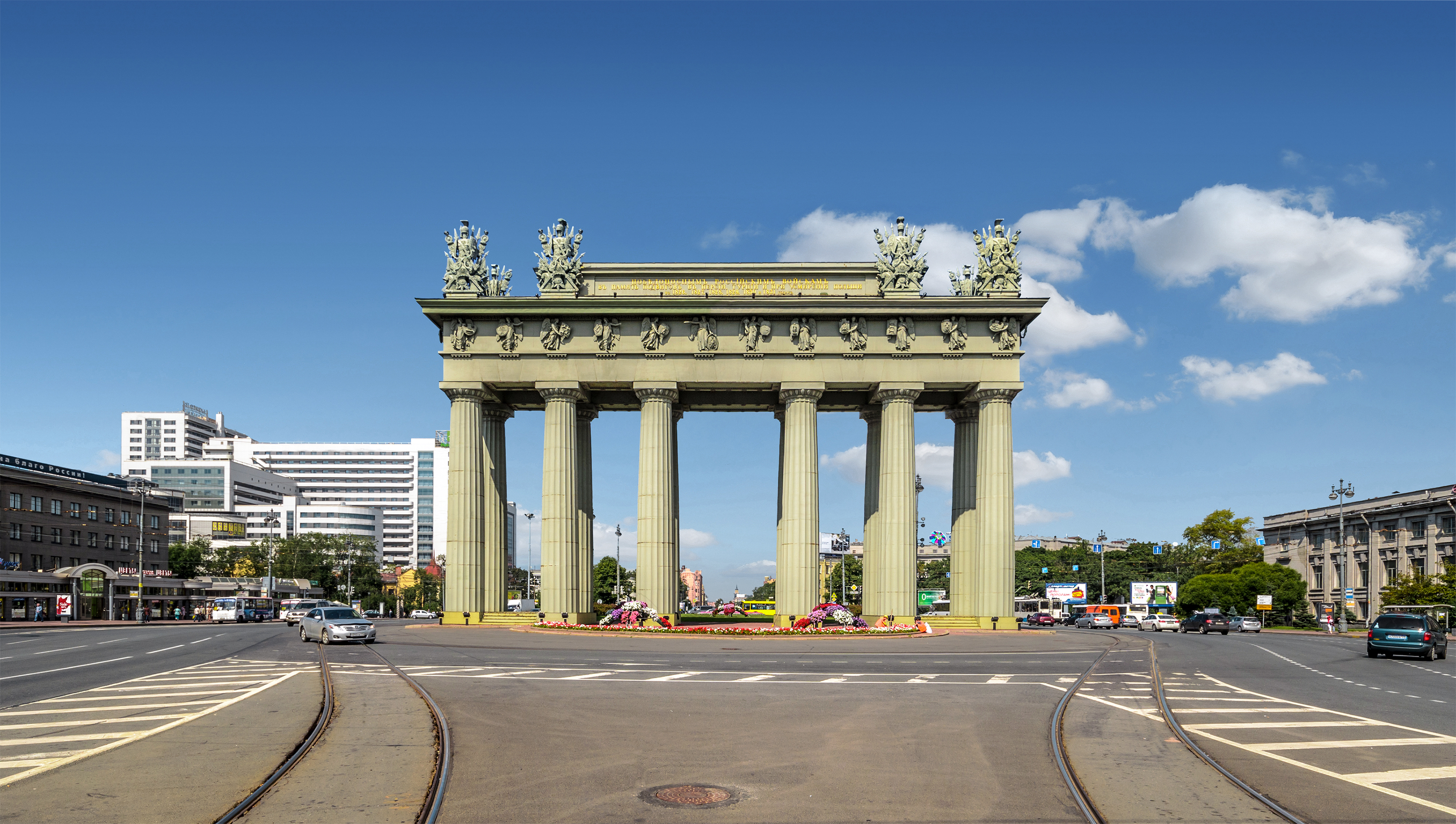
Moscow Triumphal Gate

The Moscow Triumphal Gate (Russian: Моско́вские Триумфа́льные воро́та, Moskovskiye Triumfalnye vorota) is a Neoclassical triumphal arch in Saint Petersburg, Russia. The monument, built mainly in cast iron, was erected in 1834–1838 to commemorate the Russian victory in the Russo-Turkish War, 1828-1829.

== 19th century ==
At the beginning, the triumphal gate was supposed to be erected by the Obvodny Canal, but as the city expanded further to the south, the site for the gate was moved to the intersection of the Moscow highway (today: the Moscow Avenue) and the Ligovsky Canal. In addition, two guard posts were erected on both sides of the Moscow highway. In this way, the monument not only became a triumphal structure, but also a gateway into the imperial capital.

The Moscow Triumphal Gate were designed by the Russian architect Vasily Stasov, who was also responsible for the re-design of the Narva Triumphal Gate in St. Petersburg. Stasov, an exponent of the Empire style, originally developed two different designs for the gate before a full size model of one of the designs was erected. The project was confirmed on September 14, 1834. In the following year, the Neoclassical sculptor Boris Orlovsky developed models of the sculpture details of the gate, including war trophies and figures of geniuses.

The chief material to be used in building the gate was cast iron. The castings for the ends of the columns and walls located above the cornices, the forging from the sheets of copper sculpture details including the figures of geniuses, trophies and upper parts of the columns were produced at a local factory. The cast iron for the columns were cast in another local factory.

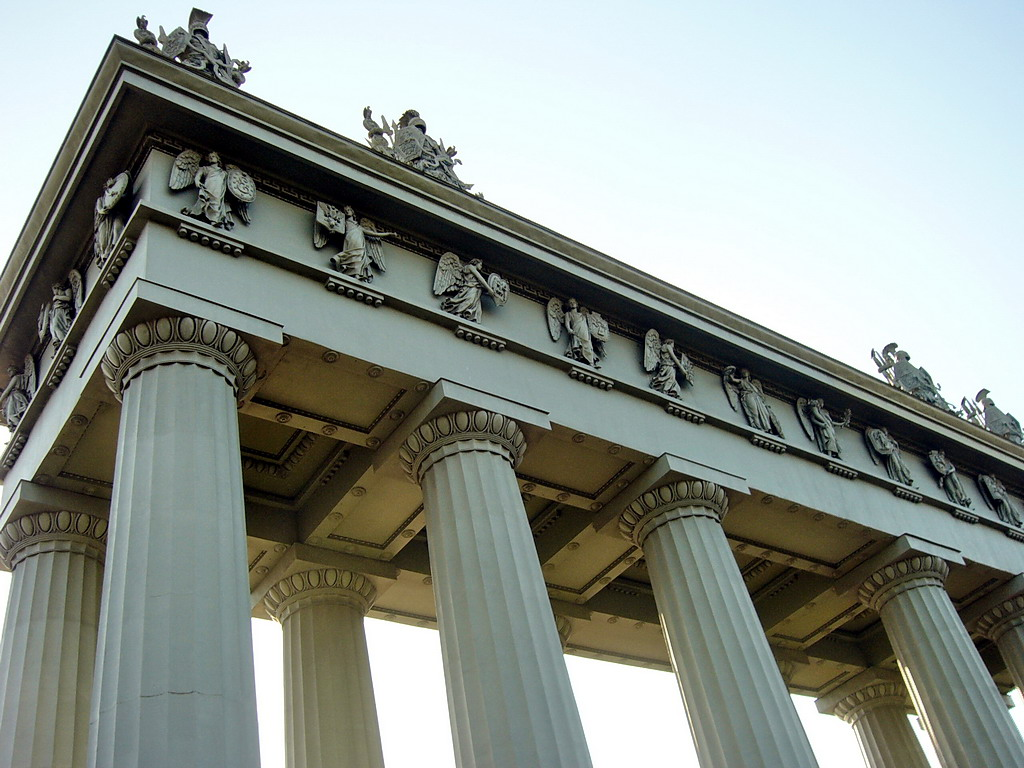
The top of the Moscow Triumphal Gate

Each column is composed of nine separate blocks together with the trunks and the upper units of the columns. All 12 columns weigh approximately a combined 450 tons. The first column was erected on July 14, 1836. The gate were finally opened two years later, on October 16, 1838. At that time, the Moscow Gate were the largest structure in the world made of cast iron.

The monumental portico made of the powerful columns symbolized greatness and glory of the Russian army. The war victory theme was further underlined with the sculpture compositions of war trophies, signs and weapons. The use of a frieze of 30 sculptural figures of genius made from copper sheets of seven different models in the monument was considered an architectural innovation of the day.

Being erected as a memorial of a military victory, the main concept behind the gate was the ostentatious display of state power. This concept is inherent in most of Stasov's designs in Saint Petersburg, such as the Pauline Barracks (1817–1821), the Trinity Cathedral (1827–1829), the Saviour Cathedral (1828–1835) and the Narva Triumphal Gate (1827–1834).

== 20th century ==
In 1936, during the period of Joseph Stalin's concentration of power over the Leningrad leadership, the historic gate was dismantled with plans to move them to Moscow Square Park. Later, during the Siege of Leningrad in 1941, when the German army approached the outskirts of Leningrad, the cast iron blocks of the gate were used in creating an anti-tank defensive structure near the southern border of the city, helping to repel the Germans during the siege. The gate was restored from 1958 to 1960. A group of restorers led by the architect Ivan Kaptsyug — who had been responsible for the restoration of the destroyed Constantine Palace in 1949–1956 — managed to recreate most of the lost sculptural details of the monument. The new columns, friezes and cornices were cast at the Kirov factory in Leningrad.
