= Anthony Vadkovsky =

Russian Orthodox bishop

- Metropolitan of Saint Petersburg and Ladoga
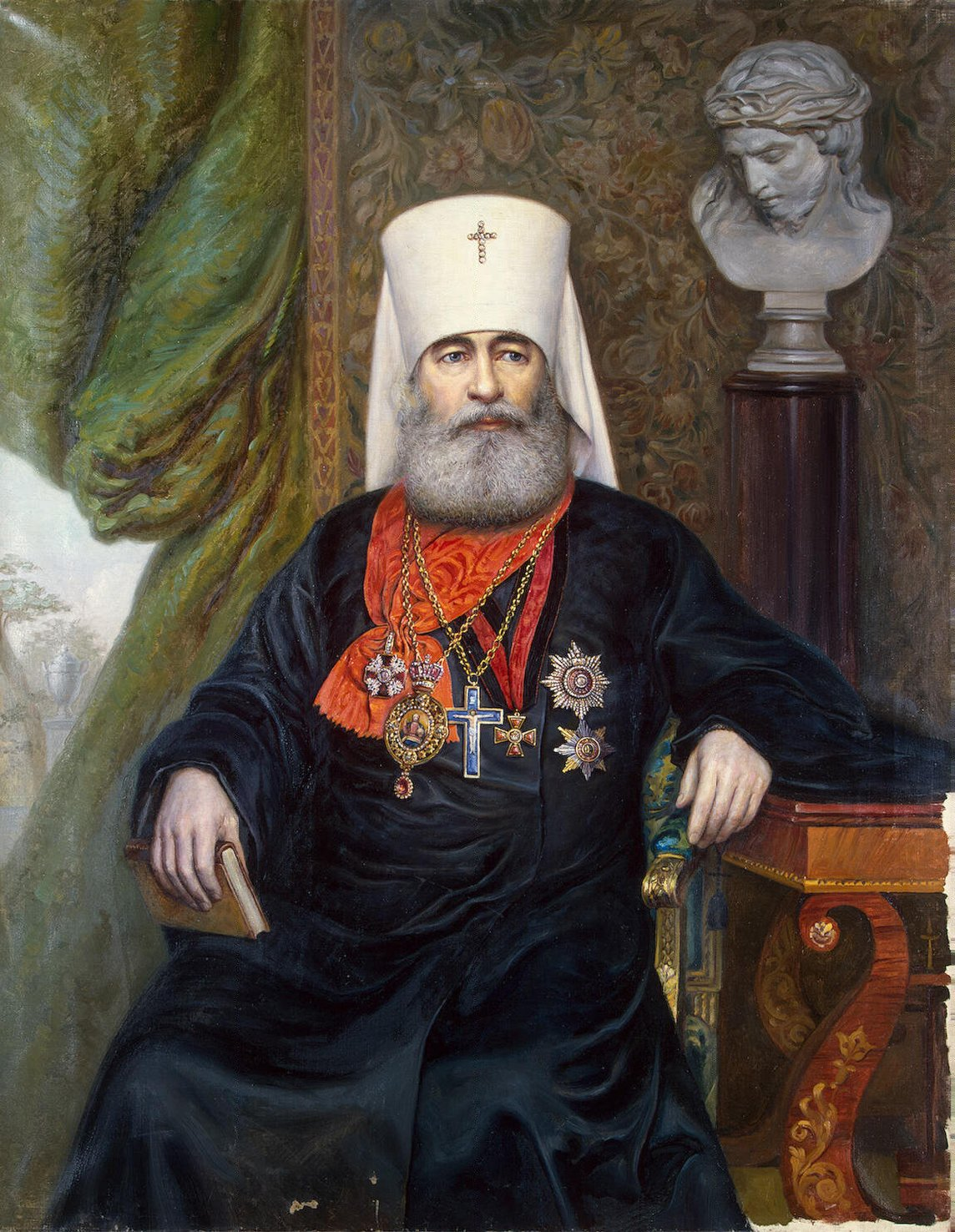
- Church: Russian Orthodox Church
- Diocese: Eparchy of Saint Petersburg and Ladoga

Orders
- Ordination: March 4, 1883
- Consecration: May 3, 1887 by Isidore (Nikolski)

Personal details
- Born: Alexander Vasilyevich Vadkovsky; August 3, 1846 Tsarovka
- Died: November 2, 1912 (aged 66) Saint Petersburg
- Buried: Nikolskoe Cemetery
- Denomination: Eastern Orthodoxy

Anthony, born Alexander Vasilyevich Vadkovsky (born on 3 September [O.S. 22 August] 1846 in Tsarovka, and died on November 2, 1912, in Saint Petersburg) (Note: Dated according to the Julian calendar in force in Tsarist Russia (old style).) was a Russian Orthodox bishop and Metropolitan of Saint Petersburg and Ladoga from 1898 to 1912.

He was the son of an Orthodox priest. Anthony completed his studies at the Tambov Theological Seminary and then at the Kazan Theological Academy. After obtaining his degree, he served as a lecturer in homiletics at the academy and also contributed to the journal Orthodox Companion. In 1872, he married Elizaveta Penkovskaya, who died of tuberculosis after seven years of marriage. When their two children, born from this union, died ten years later, Alexander Vadkovsky decided to enter monastic life and took his perpetual monastic vows on 4 March 1883. On 14 November, 1883, he was granted the dignity of archimandrite and appointed the superior of the Monastery of St. John the Baptist in Kazan. A year later, he became the inspector of the Kazan Theological Academy. With the support of the Ober-Procurator of the Most Holy Synod, Konstantin Pobedonostsev, he was transferred to the position of inspector of the Saint Petersburg Theological Academy. In 1887, he became its rector, also receiving episcopal consecration with the title of Bishop of Vyborg, vicar of the Diocese of Saint Petersburg and Ladoga.

From 1892 to 1898, Anthony served as the Bishop of Finland and Vyborg, where he initiated the translation of Orthodox liturgical texts from Church Slavonic into Finnish and participated in dialogues with the Old Catholic and Anglican churches. In 1898, he assumed the position of Metropolitan of Saint Petersburg and Ladoga, the highest ecclesiastical office of the synodal period. As Metropolitan, he was involved in charitable activities and continued his teaching role at the Saint Petersburg Theological Academy. After 1905, Metropolitan Anthony focused on reforming the structure of the Russian Orthodox Church. He sought the approval of Emperor Nicholas II for the abolition of the Most Holy Synod, the full independence of the church from state institutions, and the election of a Patriarch of Moscow and all Russia, a position that had been vacant since 1700. Between 1905 and 1906, a committee led by Anthony prepared the necessary documentation to convene a Local Council to approve these proposed changes. However, the council was not convened due to opposition from Nicholas II.

Metropolitan Anthony was a consistent opponent of political involvement by the Orthodox clergy, including the election of clergy as deputies to the State Duma. As a result, he faced criticism from Black Hundreds organizations, which accused him of liberalism and hostility towards the monarchy. Conversely, he was seen as an inspiration and precursor by renewal movements, such as the Living Church.

He died in 1912 after an illness and was buried at the Alexander Nevsky Lavra.

== Early life and academic work ==
Alexander Vadkovsky was born into a large family as the son of Vasily Yovlevich Vadkovsky, an Orthodox priest serving in the Tambov Diocese. From the age of two, he lived with his family in the village of Matchurka. At ten years old, he began his education at the lower theological school in Tambov and, after graduating in 1860, continued his studies at the theological seminary in the same city. During this period, he was a spiritual student of Bishop Theophan the Recluse, who was later canonized.

Upon completing his studies at the seminary, Alexander Vadkovsky pursued higher theological education at the Kazan Theological Academy on a state scholarship. He achieved notable academic results and, based on his thesis defended in 1870, obtained a Master's degree in theological sciences, rather than the customary Candidate of Sciences degree. His thesis examined the relationship between Arianism and Neoplatonism. In 1871, he was employed at the academy as a docent in the department of homiletics. Concurrently, he served as the chief editor of the journal Orthodox Companion and worked on cataloging manuscripts and early printed books from the Solovetsky Monastery collections that had been transferred to the Kazan Theological Academy. Subsequently, he was awarded the title of extraordinary professor, which was equivalent to the rank of State Councillor.

In 1872, he married Elizaveta Penkovskaya, who was already suffering from tuberculosis and died seven years later. From this marriage, two children were born, who died of diphtheria in 1882. Following these personal losses, Alexander Vadkovsky decided to enter monastic life.

He was tonsured as a monk on March 4, 1883, by Archbishop Palladius of Kazan, and received the monastic name Anthony in honor of Bishop Anthony of Kazan. Two days later, he was ordained as a hieromonk. He continued his academic and teaching duties at the Kazan Theological Academy, where he was one of the two clergy lecturers. On 14 November 1883, he was elevated to the rank of archimandrite and appointed as the superior of the Monastery of St. John the Baptist in Kazan. In 1884, he was appointed as the inspector of the Kazan Theological Academy. In 1885, Konstantin Pobedonostsev, the Ober-Procurator of the Most Holy Synod, visited Kazan and recognized Archimandrite Anthony as a devout monk, capable organizer, and educated theologian. With his support, Anthony was transferred to the position of inspector at the Saint Petersburg Theological Academy.

== Bishop ==
=== Bishop of Vyborg ===
On 3 May 1887, Anthony was consecrated as the Bishop of Vyborg, serving as a vicar of the Eparchy of Saint Petersburg and Ladoga. He was also appointed as the rector of the Saint Petersburg Theological Academy. During his tenure, he played a significant role in enhancing the level of theological education at the academy and encouraged students to engage in practical church work, including pastoral and educational activities in Saint Petersburg parishes. He established a student circle that conducted theological and moral meetings in prisons, shelters, and parishes. Additionally, he supported the creation of a Byzantine studies department at the academy and sought to increase the number of monks educated in theology.

Anthony continued to support the Kazan Theological Academy by donating 287 books in 1891 and contributing 5,000 rubles in 1899 for student scholarships.

=== Bishop of Finland and Vyborg ===
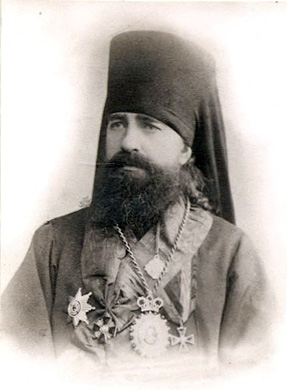
Anthony as a bishop

In 1892, Bishop Anthony was transferred to the Eparchy of Finland and Vyborg. Around this time, he was officially introduced to Empress Maria Feodorovna, who became his patroness. In the Grand Duchy of Finland, Anthony focused on developing the missionary activities of the Russian Orthodox Church while striving to avoid associating the faith solely with the Russification efforts in the region. He established 14 new parishes, (Note: Thus, their number increased from 23 to 37.) facilitated the construction of 10 churches, and initiated Orthodox publications in both Finnish and Russian. Additionally, he founded the country’s first female monastery, began translating liturgical texts from Church Slavonic to Finnish, opened more parish schools, and engaged in various charitable activities. His efforts played a significant role in the future establishment of the Orthodox Church of Finland. In 1893, he organized a congress of Finnish Orthodox clergy in Serdobol and frequently visited the parishes under his jurisdiction.

In 1892, he also published a volume of his works on homiletics and church history in Saint Petersburg, titled On the History of Christian Preaching. He was awarded a Doctor of Theology degree in 1895. In 1893, he became the head of a commission for dialogue with Old Catholics, a position he held for five years. The commission aimed to facilitate the potential entry of some Old Catholics into the Orthodox Church. Bishop Anthony, valuing dialogue, advocated for the acceptance of the teachings of the Russian Orthodox Church by Old Catholics, particularly in ecclesiology, where theological differences were most pronounced, and the abandonment of the Filioque clause in the creed.

In 1897, as a leading hierarch of the Russian Orthodox Church, he made an official visit to the United Kingdom to participate in the celebrations marking the 60th anniversary of Queen Victoria's reign. During this visit, he engaged in dialogue with Anglicans and received honorary doctorates from the universities of Oxford and Cambridge. He also traveled to Germany to meet with Old Catholic theologians. Upon returning to Russia, on 24 December 1898, he was appointed Metropolitan of Saint Petersburg, the highest-ranking hierarch in the Russian Orthodox Church, succeeding the late Palladius Rayev.

== Metropolitan of Saint Petersburg ==
=== Pastoral and charitable activities ===
As Metropolitan of Saint Petersburg, Anthony regularly visited prisoners, adhering to the traditional Russian practice of church hierarchs advocating for their welfare to the authorities. He was actively involved in charitable activities, serving as chairman of an organization founded by Empress Maria Feodorovna that supported the blind and working with the charitable Brotherhood of the Queen of Heaven, also under the patronage of the Empress. He allocated 27,000 rubles monthly from his 29,000 rubles salary as Metropolitan to charitable causes. Additionally, he established the All-Russian Brotherhood of Sobriety, named after St. Alexander Nevsky. He discontinued the practice of hosting lavish receptions at the metropolitan residence and instead directed his financial support toward city clergy and the construction of churches and monasteries. He was also a pioneer in introducing electric lighting to Russian churches.

In 1903, he presided over the canonization celebrations of Monk Seraphim of Sarov. In 1909, he founded an archaeological museum at the Alexander Nevsky Lavra. He supported the Galicia-Russian Charitable Society.

=== Excommunication of Leo Tolstoy ===
On 22 February 1901, the Most Holy Synod declared the writer Leo Tolstoy an enemy of the church and excommunicated him. This decision was primarily prompted by the content of Tolstoy's novel Resurrection, which included a critical depiction of an Orthodox service in a prison chapel and challenged the Russian Orthodox Church's position on social issues in Russia. The excommunication also addressed Tolstoy's criticisms of the Russian church, his rejection of the sacraments, and his views on the salvation of the soul. (Note: Tolstoy's moral-philosophical teaching actually went against the basic tenets of Orthodox theology, as the writer himself admitted.) Metropolitan Anthony was a principal initiator of the excommunication, although Konstantin Pobedonostsev had been advocating for this action for some time.

=== In the face of changes in Russia ===
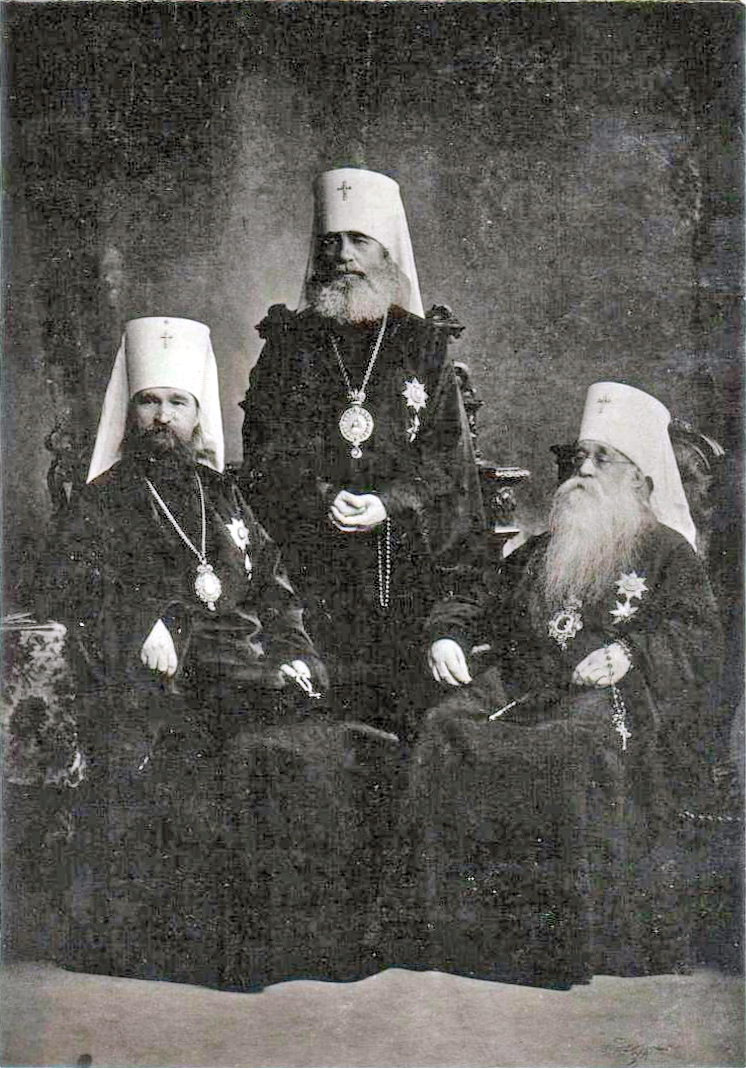
Metropolitan Anthony (center), along with Metropolitans Vladimir of Moscow (left) and Flavian of Kyiv (right), all attempted unsuccessfully in 1905 to convene a local council of the Russian Orthodox Church and restore the patriarchate

On 22 March 1905, the Most Holy Synod, chaired by Metropolitan Anthony, presented a memorandum to Emperor Nicholas II. This document requested changes in the legal status of the Russian Orthodox Church, the convening of a Local Council, and the election of a Patriarch. Citing the emperor’s previous edict on religious tolerance, Anthony argued that minority faiths had been granted more freedoms than the official church. He emphasized to Prime Minister Sergei Witte that to address the church's situation, four legal changes were essential:

- Abolition of the Most Holy Synod;
- Establishment of a collegial governing body composed of clergy;
- Convening a Local Council;
- Election of a Patriarch of Moscow and all Russia.

Metropolitan Anthony criticized the church’s subordination to state administration and its diminished authority in social matters and individual morality.

On March 31, Nicholas II agreed with the main points of the memorandum but, influenced by Konstantin Pobedonostsev, deemed the immediate organization of a council inappropriate due to the country’s internal complexities. Nonetheless, he allowed preliminary preparations for the future council. On July 27, 1905, Anthony requested suggestions from all Russian bishops regarding necessary changes in the church and issues for the council’s agenda. On December 17, Nicholas II agreed to convene a Council of Bishops, (Note: Not the Local Council, which includes delegates of parish clergy and laity in addition to the hierarchy.) and on December 27, a committee was formed to prepare an official ukase announcing the council and its agenda. The committee, led by Metropolitans Anthony, Vladimir of Moscow, and Flavian of Kyiv, advocated for the abolition of the Most Holy Synod and the restoration of the patriarchate. Preparatory work continued from March to December 1906, with Anthony focusing on organizing the council during 1906 and 1907. However, on 25 April 1907, after reviewing the preparatory documents, Nicholas II concluded that the time for changes in the Russian Orthodox Church had not yet come. (Note: Due to Tsar Nicholas II's dislike of the institution of the council, it did not take place until after the February Revolution.) This decision was influenced by voices from the imperial family, interior ministers, and subsequent Ober-Procurators of the Synod, including Alexander Obolensky, Alexei Shiryinsky-Shikhmatov, and Peter Izvolsky.

Unlike many of his contemporaries, Metropolitan Anthony supported grassroots movements among white clergy advocating for structural renewal, internal reforms, and the convening of a local council. He permitted the Philosophical-Religious Assemblies organized by Dmitry Merezhkovsky and Zinaida Gippius and allowed Orthodox clergy to participate. Additionally, he initiated discussions within the church on various aspects of Orthodox monasticism, including the monks' roles in Russian society, their interactions with different social strata (particularly the intelligentsia), and potential operational changes in monasteries.

Metropolitan Anthony opposed the involvement of Orthodox clergy in political organizations and deemed it inappropriate for clergy to run for the State Duma after 1905. He believed that direct political engagement by hierarchs, including the formation of a clerical party, would undermine the church's authority, which was already weakened. He did not support any Black Hundreds organizations, despite their professed attachment to Orthodoxy. (Note: The stance of Metropolitan Antoni was an exception. The Orthodox clergy, especially in the western provinces of the Russian Empire, joined local branches of the Union of the Russian People in significant numbers, and at least a few hierarchs not only joined the Black Hundreds organizations but also played leading roles in them.) In 1906, he refused Alexander Dubrovin's request to consecrate the banners of the Union of the Russian People, stating that he would reject similar requests from other parties. In a conversation with Dubrovin, he expressed his disapproval of right-wing parties, stating:

I have no sympathy for your right-wing parties and consider you terrorists: left-wing terrorists throw bombs, and right-wing parties throw stones at everyone who disagrees with them.

Consequently, Metropolitan Anthony faced accusations from the Black Hundreds press of liberalism and supporting the idea of overthrowing the tsar. He was also criticized for perceived careerism, a lack of intellectual prowess, ambitions for the patriarchate, and for promoting clergy with socialist tendencies. After the October Revolution, renewalist movements, such as the Living Church, cited Anthony as an inspiration and precursor.

In 1906, although elected to the State Council in April, Anthony chose to resign in July. Following peasant riots in Russia that year, he condemned the participants as criminals committing unprecedented crimes but did not call for immediate suppression. Instead, he urged bishops to collaborate for the benefit of the state and the people.

Metropolitan Anthony was generally lenient with his clergy, often advocating for those with liberal or revolutionary sympathies to the state authorities. Simultaneously, he sought to limit Rasputin's influence at court and in the Synod.

Anthony’s respected status among the clergy allowed him to maintain unity among church hierarchs during his lifetime, with no significant conflicts among bishops. An exception was the 1905 attempt by conservative bishops Nicholas, Anthony, Hermogenes, and Seraphim to remove him from the Synod. Despite his efforts to mobilize parish clergy and advocate for internal church reforms, his political views did not gain widespread support among most priests, who were elected to the Duma and aligned with various factions.

=== Illness and death ===
After 1910, Metropolitan Anthony's declining health necessitated a reduction in his activities. His final meeting with the Synod occurred on October 16, 1912, and he died a few days later.

Anthony’s funeral took place at the Holy Trinity Cathedral of the Alexander Nevsky Lavra in Saint Petersburg. The service was led by Metropolitan Vladimir of Moscow, with 22 other bishops, 60 archimandrites and protopriests, and 150 hieromonks and white clergy in attendance.
