= Moskovsky Avenue =

Prospekt in Saint Petersburg, Russia

Coordinates: 59.8859°N 30.3197°E

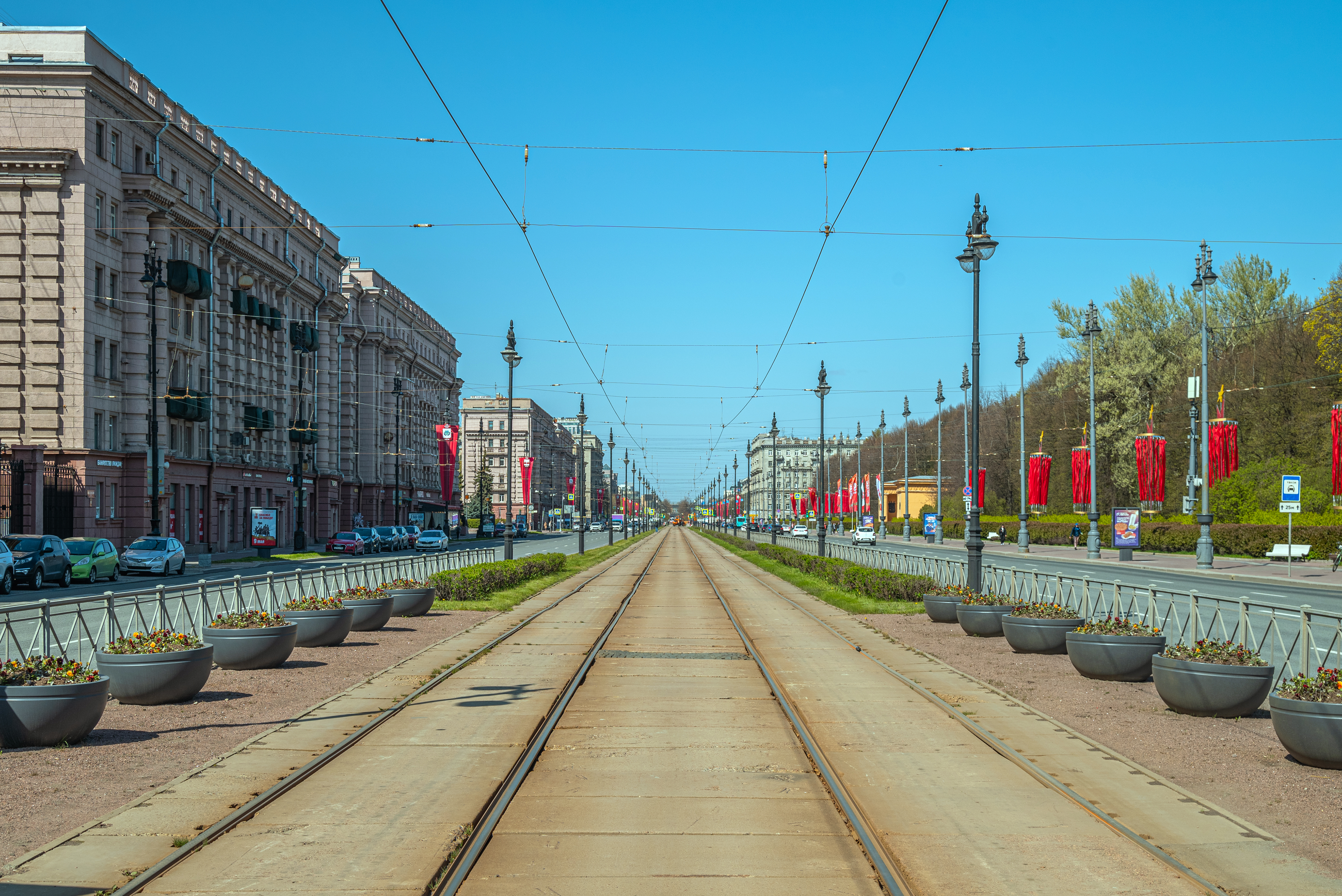
Moskovsky Prospekt near the Victory park.

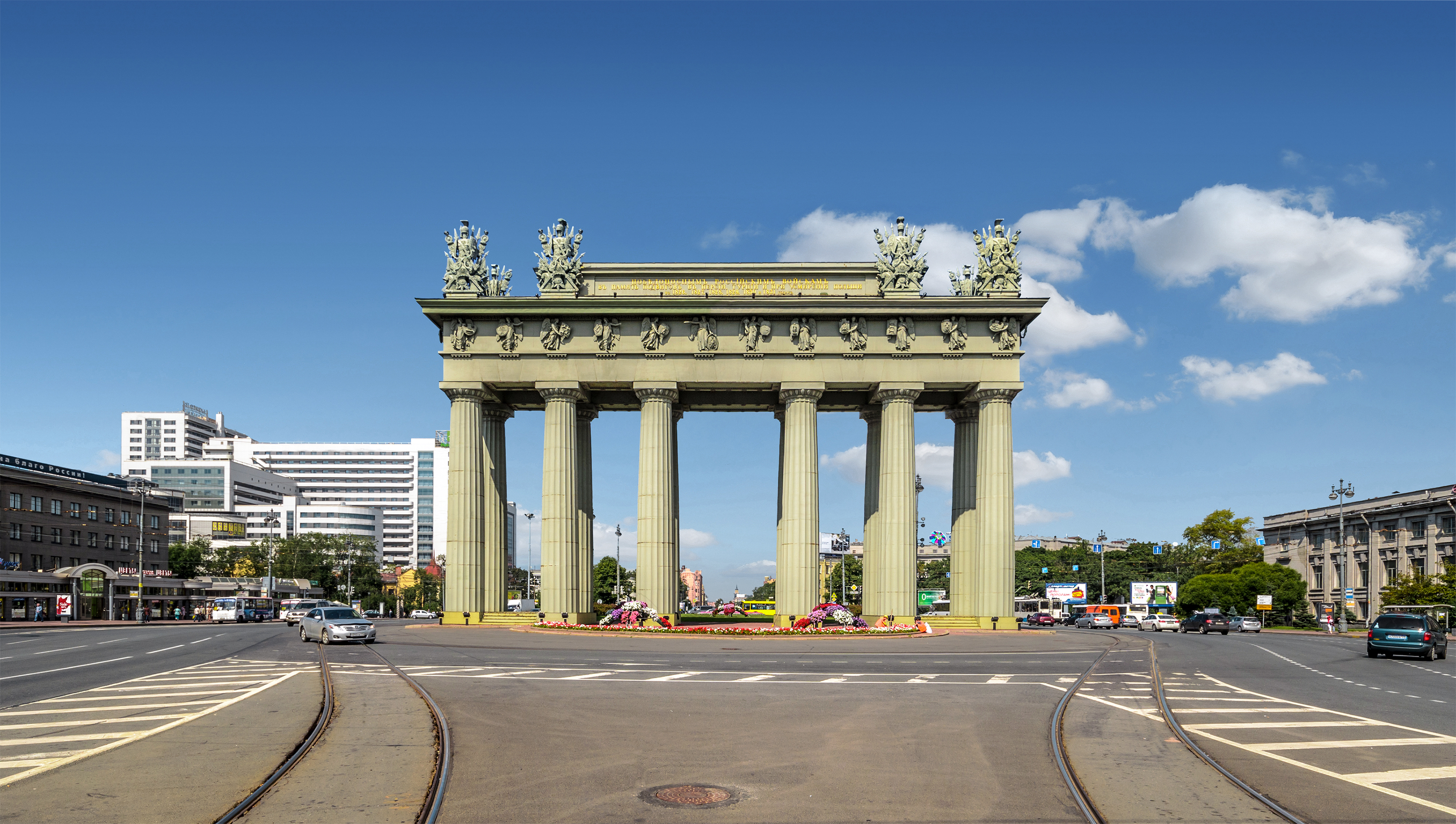
Moscow Triumphal Gate.

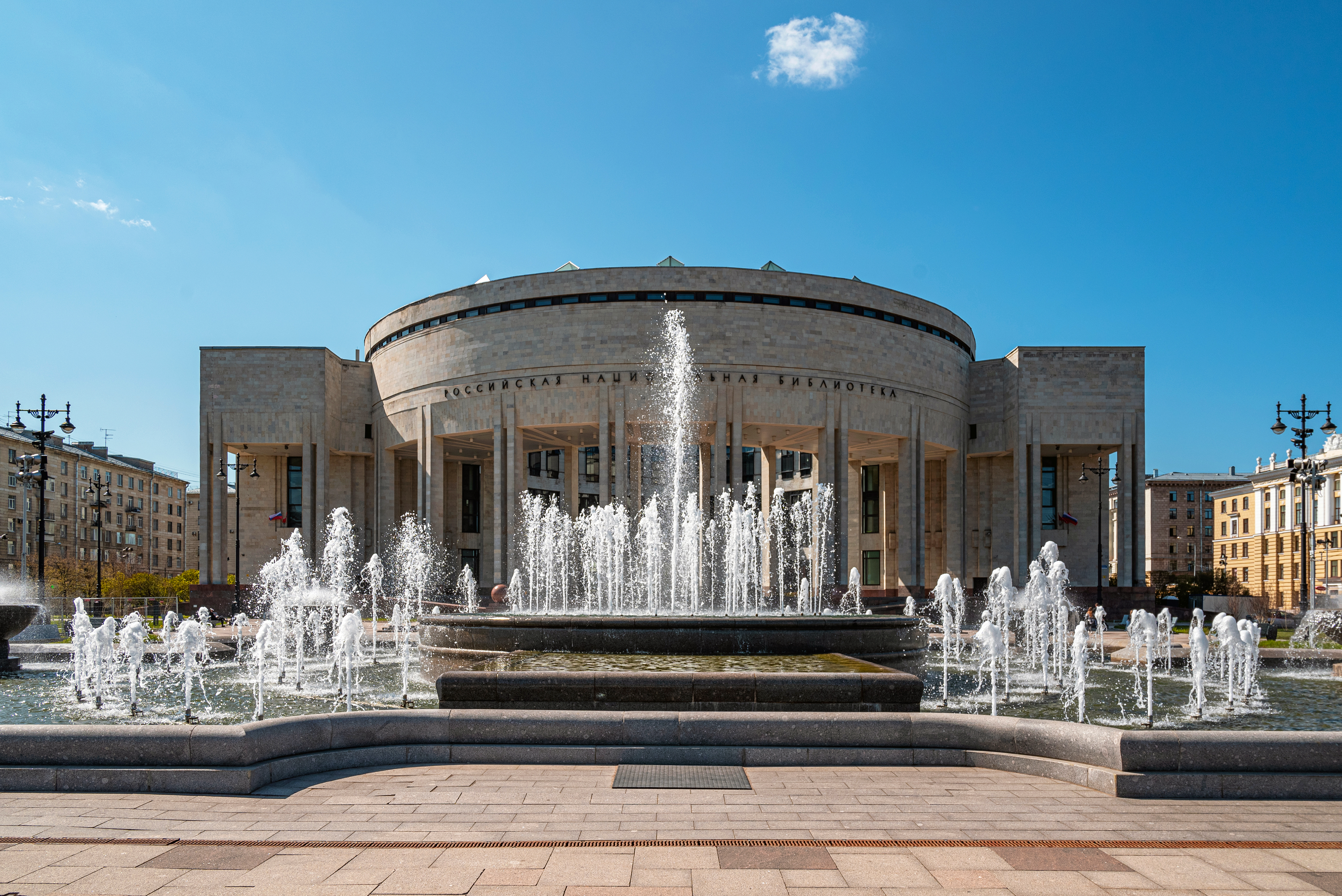
New building of the Russian National Library on Moskovsky Prospekt.

Moskovsky Prospekt (Russian: Моско́вский проспе́кт, Moskovsky Avenue) is a 10 km-long prospekt in Saint Petersburg, Russia. It runs from Sennaya Square and Sadovaya Street, to Victory Square, where it splits into the Pulkovo Highway and Moscow Highway. It crosses the Fontanka River, Zagorodny Prospekt, Obvodny Canal, and Ligovsky Avenue. It is named for and leads to Moscow.

The prospekt began to develop as a part of the major route connecting the city with Moscow and south provinces. The original name of the prospekt was Tsarskoselskaya Doroga ("Route to Tsarskoe Selo") since it leads to imperial estates in Tsarskoye Selo. In the 1770s, marble mileposts were installed along the way; many have survived to this day.

Among the historic buildings along the prospekt are the Saint Petersburg State Institute of Technology, the New Smolny Convent and the adjacent Novodevichy Cemetery. The intersection with Ligovsky Prospekt features the Moscow Triumphal Gate designed by Vasily Stasov and constructed in 1834–1838 to commemorate the victory in the Russo-Turkish War of 1828–1829. After the Russo-Turkish War, 1877-1878 the prospekt was renamed Zabalkansky (i.e., Transbalkanian), to memorialize the crossing of the Balkans by the Russian army.

The southern stretch of the prospekt features an ensemble of buildings built in the distinctive Stalinist style in the 1930–1950s, including the House of Soviets (1941), which was a military stronghold and command post during the Siege in World War II.

== Notable features ==
- The 842-room hotel Park Inn Pulkovskaya is located on Moskovsky Prospekt.
- A part of the prospekt runs along Moskovsky Victory Park, founded in commemoration of the Russian victory in World War II.
