= Grigory Skornyakov-Pisarev =

Russian educator and statesman (died after 1745)

Grigory Grigoryevich Skornyakov-Pisarev (Russian: Григорий Григорьевич Скорняков-Писарев; died after 1745) was a Russian educator and statesman.

== Biography ==
Born in the second half of the seventeenth century, Skornyakov-Pisarev studied in Italy and Berlin, returning to Russia with knowledge of mathematics, mechanics, and engineering. For the next twenty years he oversaw instruction in the art of gunnery. In accordance with a series of decrees between 1714 and 1716, he was put in charge of new schools at Pskov, Novgorod, Yaroslavl, Moscow, and Vologda. From 1715 he taught at the new Maritime Academy (ru) in Saint Petersburg, becoming its director in 1719. In 1722 he published the first treatise on mechanics in Russian, which included an unfulfilled promise to write more fully on the subject in the future.

Forging a close relationship with Tsar Peter the Great, and his close associates, including Prince Menshikov, in 1717 Skornyakov-Pisarev was entrusted with the initial investigations of Tsarina Eudoxia Feodorovna Lopukhina. He was also involved in the hearings against Tsarevich Alexei Petrovich. By 1718, he had been appointed Chief Procurator of the Senate. He was also put in charge of the greatest engineering project of the day, the Ladoga Canal. In 1723, however, he fell from grace: he was implicated in a conspiracy against Menshikov, progress on the canal was found to be unsatisfactory, and he was arrested, knouted, deprived of his rank and estates, and exiled to Siberia.

Under Peter's successor, Empress Anna, Skornyakov-Pisarev enjoyed partial rehabilitation. Acting on Bering's recommendations for further exploration after the First Kamchatka expedition, in 1731 Anna appointed Skornyakov-Pisarev commandant of the Okhotsk region. By decree of the Senate the following year, the population of Okhotsk was to be augmented, grain cultivation initiated, a landing and wharf constructed, and ships built for trade in furs and other items with Kamchatka.

Skornyakov-Pisarev's progress, however, was slow. Making it as far as Yakutsk, there he remained for almost three years, engaged in disputes over men, equipment, and supplies, during which he and the local official denounced and even arrested one another. After finally arriving in Okhotsk in 1735 with eighty families of Cossacks and sixty of Yakuts, he is said to given himself over to drink and his concubines, and there were also accusations of financial irregularities. Nevertheless, as founder of the so-called Siberian Flotilla or Okhostk Flotilla, the first Russian naval group in the Pacific, which numbered some eight vessels by 1742, he is said to have paved the way for the future development of the Pacific Fleet.

In 1741, he returned to European Russia with his former rank and possessions restored. In August that year, Aleksei Chirikov sent to the Admiralty College a report on the Great Northern Expedition; Skornyakov-Pisarev wrote an unfavourable short report on Chirikov's report. A few years later, some time around the middle of the century, he died.

== Sources ==
- "Скорняков-Писарев, Григорий Григорьевич" . Brockhaus and Efron Encyclopedic Dictionary (in Russian). 1906.
