= Eastern Orthodoxy in Pakistan =

Eastern Orthodoxy in Pakistan is a Christian denomination in the country of Pakistan. In 2011, the number of Eastern Orthodox Christians in Pakistan was estimated at 500 people. The present population of Orthodox Christians in Pakistan is around 3,000. It represents approximately 0.0002% of the population. Eastern Orthodox churches in the country are represented by the Patriarchate of Constantinople, the Patriarchate of Moscow and the Russian Orthodox Church Outside Russia (ROCOR) The five Eastern Orthodox parishes are Parish of Constantinople Patriarchate (Wazirabad), Parish of the Russian Orthodox Church (MP) (Lahore) Community of the Russian Orthodox Church (MP) (Islamabad), Russian Orthodox Church Outside Russia (ROCOR) (Sargodha) and Rahimyarkhan, Faisalabad and Rawalpindi Islamabad (Ghotki Sindh).

== Organization ==
=== Patriarchate of Constantinople ===
In 2005, an Eastern Orthodox mission, headed by Pakistani priest John Tanveer, opened in Pakistan. In 1986 he began serving as a Catholic priest in Lahore. In 1990 he met with the Greek Orthodox general. Following the meeting, Tanveer visited Australia, where he became acquainted with Eastern Orthodoxy. In 1996, he resigned as Catholic priest in 1997, and married a graduate of the University of Oxford. In 1998, Tanveer came in contact with the representatives of the Patriarchate of Constantinople and wrote a petition to adopt it in Eastern Orthodoxy. In 2001, his application was approved, and in 2003 he had his first meeting with the Eastern Orthodox bishop. In 2005, Tanveer and his family, as well as many other people, adopted Eastern Orthodoxy.

During his missionary activity Tanveer opened a churchand catechetical school in his home. He translated into Urdu liturgical texts and books (including "Conversations with St. Seraphim of Sarov"). He raised the issue of the official registration of the Eastern Orthodox Church in Pakistan to gather funds to build a spiritual center. Action also came in Wazirabad.

On April 21, 2013 construction of the first Eastern Orthodox church began in Wazirabad. It was consecrated on February 6, 2014.

=== Moscow Patriarchate ===
The parish of the Russian Orthodox Church in Islamabad was established on July 26, 2010, in compliance with the decision of Patriarch Kirill of Moscow and All Russia and the Holy Synod. In October 2012, the foundation stone of the future church was laid in the territory of the Embassy of the Russian Federation in Islamabad. Construction began in 2015 and finished in October 2016. In August 2017 a graduate of Tomsk Theological Seminary, Priest Paul Sushil (Anjum) started missionary work in Pakistan. Sushil was responsible for looking after the Orthodox communities in Lahore and Islamabad as the Representative of Russian Orthodox Church in Pakistan (Moscow Patriarchate).

=== Russian Orthodox Church Outside Russia ===
ROCOR in Pakistan is headed by Bishop, Metropolitan of Eastern America and New York, First-Hierarch Hilarion Kapral. Its Mission is St.Michael the Archangel Orthodox Mission of Pakistan. The priest is Father Joseph Farooq, the only canonical ROCOR priest in the country.

The Mission was started in 2008, canonically established in 2012 and registered in Pakistan in 2014. 780 believers make up the Russian Orthodox Family in Pakistan. The Church has spiritual and canonical union with Patriarch Kirill of Moscow and All Russia.

St. Matrona of Moscow Adult Education Center and Sewing Center was founded in March 2016 as an outreach program of Mission to poor women. In April 2017 Father Farooq visited Russia to venerate the Holy Sites and Relics. Father Farooq wrote Tsar-Martyr Nicholas II’S Journey To Pakistan Notes of a Pakistani Orthodox Priest.

ROCOR Believers live in Sargodha, Ghotki, Rahimyarkhan, Faisalabad, Rawalpindi and Islamabad under the pastoral care of Father Farooq.

Father Farooq translated books into Urdu for the benefit of Believers in Pakistan: Divine Liturgy of Saint John Chrysostom, Eastern Orthodox Prayer book, Catechism of Eastern Orthodox Church, often referred as a New Chrysostom Life of Saint Sergius of Radonezh, Saint Seraphim of Sarov, Righteous Father John of Kronstadt, Blessed Mother Matrona of Moscow and Holy Royal Martyrs of Russia along with various Liturgical Texts,

=== Russian Orthodox Church Old Rite ===
The Russian Orthodox Church Old Rite in Pakistan was started in 2006, but canonically establish 2016 with the blessing of Eminence Metropolitan Korniliy and registered in 2017. Instrumental to the foundation of the Old-Rite church in Pakistan was Cyril Shahzad, a former Russian Orthodox priest who joined the Old-rite church after visiting Rogozhskoye. Russian Orthodox old believers live in Sargodha, Wazirabad, Islamabad, Bhalwal. They worship primarily in English and Urdu.
