= Yakunin =

Yakunin (Russian: Якунин; feminine: Yakunina) is a Russian language family name:

- Gleb Yakunin (1936–2014), Russian priest and dissident
- Aleksandra Yakunina-Denton (born 1991), English singer better known as Shura
- Vladimir Yakunin (born 1948), president of state-run Russian Railways company
