= Church reform of Peter the Great =

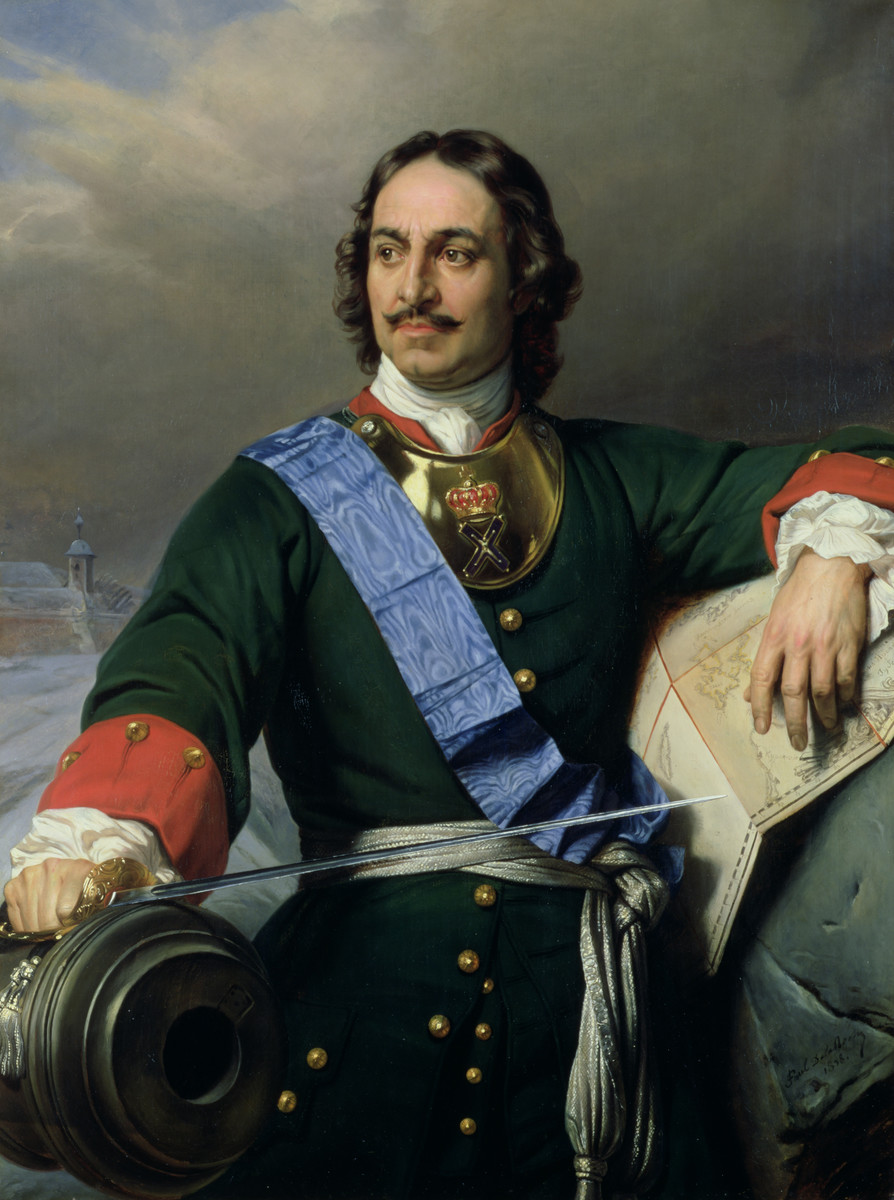
Peter I of Russia, portrait by Paul Delaroche, 1838

The church reform of Peter the Great was a set of changes Peter I of Russia (r. 1682–1725) introduced to the Russian Orthodox Church, especially to church government. Issued in the context of Peter's overall Westernizing reform programme, it replaced the office of the patriarch of Moscow with the Holy Synod and made the church effectively a department of state.

Peter did not abandon Orthodoxy as the main ideological core of the state, but attempted to start a process of Westernization of the clergy, relying on those with a Western theological education.

== Background ==
Previously, the tsars of Russia had exerted some influence on church operations; however, until Peter's reforms the church had been relatively free in its internal governance. Following the model of the Byzantine Empire, the tsar was considered to be the "Defender of Orthodoxy". In this capacity he had the right of veto over the election of new bishops, and upon the consecration of new bishops he would often be the one to present the crozier to them. The tsar would also be involved in major ecclesiastical decisions. In 1551, Tsar Ivan IV summoned the Synod of a Hundred Chapters (Russian: Стоглавый Собор), which confirmed the inviolability of church properties and the exclusive jurisdiction of ecclesiastical courts over clergy, and the norms of church life were regulated. The Great Synod of Moscow in 1666–1667 was also presided over by the tsar.

== Reforms ==
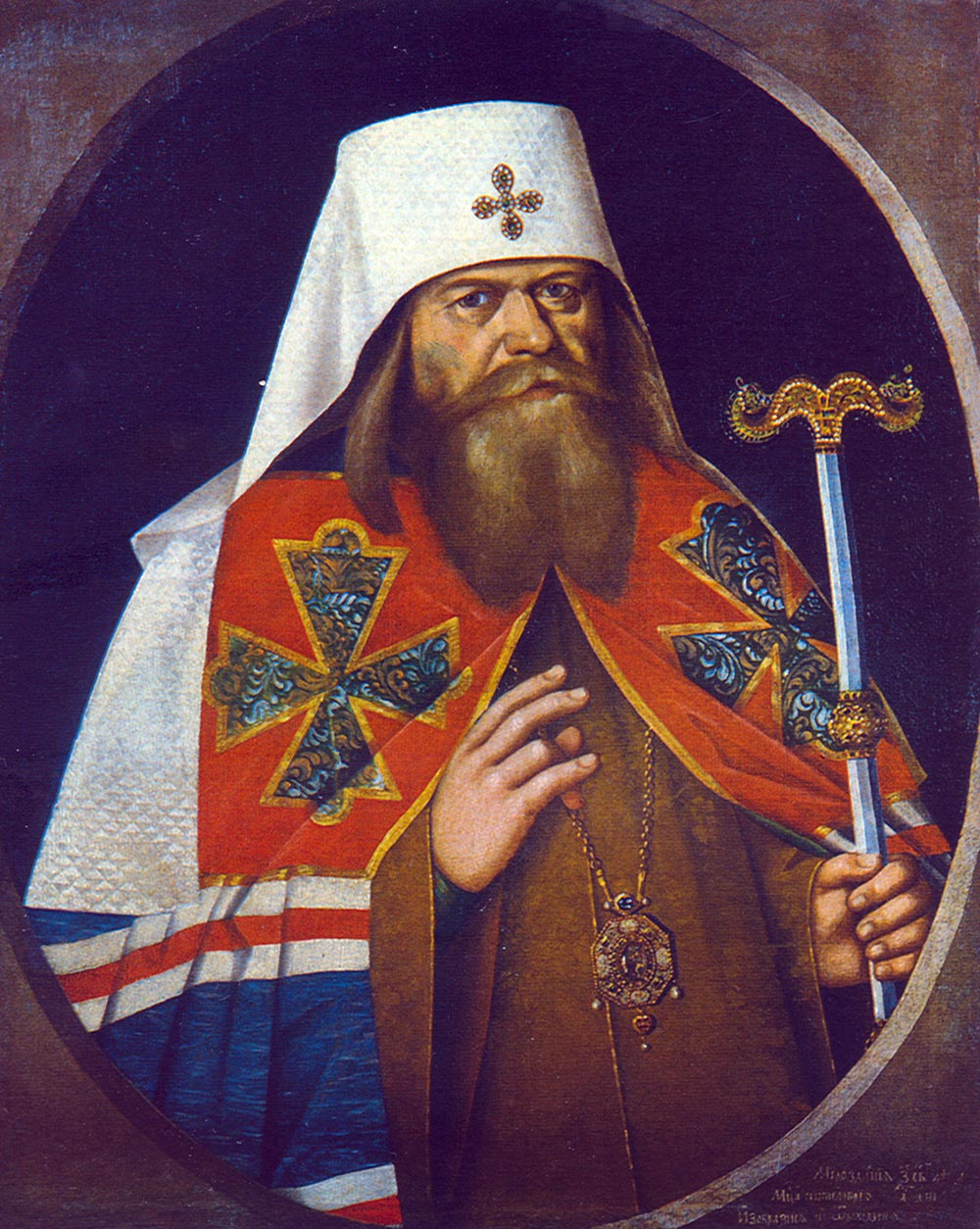
Patriarch Adrian (r. 1690–1700)

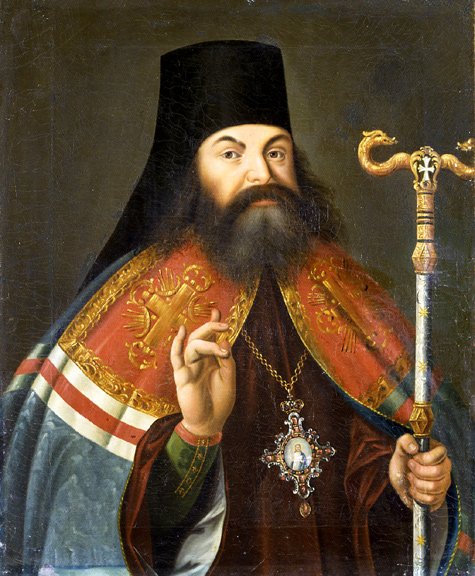
Archbishop Theophan Prokopovich, Peter's ally in his reform of the Russian Orthodox Church

Peter I ushered in an era in which the church government was fundamentally transformed: instead of being governed by a patriarch or metropolitan, the government of the church came under the control of a committee known as the Holy Synod, which was composed both of bishops and lay bureaucrats appointed by the emperor.

Peter introduced numerous reforms to his country that were designed to create and pay for a new government and a military and naval system that would enable Russia to trade with, compete with, and, as necessary defend Russia's European interests by force of arms. The ruthlessness with which he implemented his governmental and tax collection reforms, and the forced buildup of his new capital city, Saint Petersburg, augured poorly for the independence of the church.

When Patriarch Adrian (r. 1690–1700) died in October 1700, Peter prevented the election of a new patriarch, and instead appointed Stephen Yavorsky as patriarchal "exarch", locum tenens, or, literally, the custodian of the patriarchal throne (Russian: блюститель патриаршего престола). Yavorsky was a young professor from the Kiev Academy of a breakaway region of the Polish–Lithuanian Commonwealth also known as the Cossack Hetmanate, who had trained at a Jesuit academy in Poland, and who argued in favor of a strong patriarchate and the independence of the church. He headed the church together with a bishop council, however his powers were very limited, as for example all church property was under administration of the monastical prikaz, which was out of the church jurisdiction. As a result, monasteries became the main nests of opposition, and in order to fight them the government prohibited monks to keep in their cells pen and paper. Yavorsky who might have been thinking of becoming a patriarch himself was not fully supportive of Peters ideas to "bureaucratise" by introducing a collegiate system. Yavorsky publicly declared his opposition to introducing civil procurators-fiscal (as in Scotland) in church courts. After Yavorsky became close with supporters of Alexei Petrovich, Tsarevich of Russia, who was in opposition to his father, Peter the Great dismissed Yavorsky.

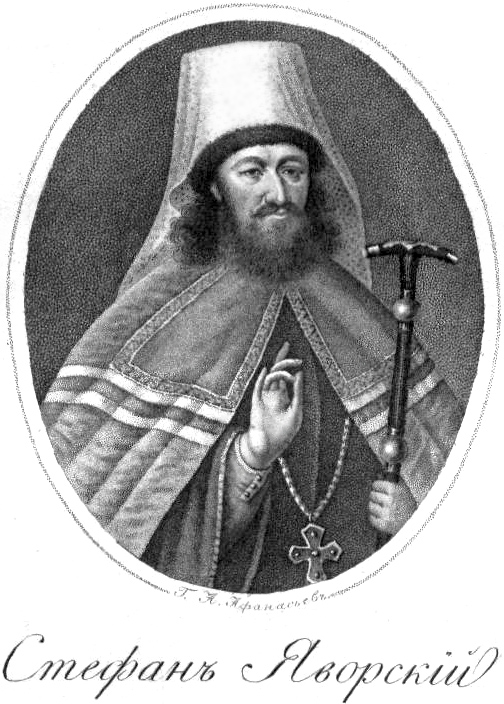
Metropolitan Stephen Yavorsky

Gradually, Peter came to favor another professor from the Kiev Academy, Theofan Prokopovich, whose Spiritual Regulation (1721) supported the concept of a Russian national church under the authority of the tsar as the "supreme bishop", and argued that an ecclesiastical council would be more appropriate to govern the church than a single patriarch. It seemed dubious to Prokopovich to have a dual power in the Russian Empire and was supportive of the idea of a single and an ultimate autocrat. Among the Russian clergy, however, Prokopovich was perceived as a Lutheran and a pietist who studied Protestantism and who did not mature in the culture of the Eastern Orthodoxy. Against him energetically protested the rector of the Moscow Academy Theophilakt Lopatinsky when Prokopovich was appointed the metropolitan of Pskov.

Apart from his Lutheran-influenced church hierarchy proposals, Prokopovich also imported Protestant-leaning ideas into Russian theological schools, which by the mid-eighteenth century replaced the previously dominant Jesuit-leaning ideas from the Joasaph Krokovsky and Theophylact Lopatinsky. In 1717, he had a New Testament published in parallel Dutch and Church Slavonic.

Peter ended up losing the support of the Russian clergy over his reforms. Local priests became very suspicious of Peter's friendship with foreigners, the shaving of beards, and his alleged Protestant propensities.

In 1721, Peter established the Ecclesiastical College to govern the church ("college", or kollegia, a word borrowed from the Swedish governmental system, was the term Peter used for his government ministries, each one headed by a committee instead of a single minister). The Ecclesiastical College was soon renamed the Holy Governing Synod or Most Holy Synod, and was administered by bishops but with the presence of a lay crown official, the ober-procurator. The Synod changed in composition over time, but basically it remained a committee of churchmen headed by a primus, always a metropolitan or an archbishop, chosen by the emperor, with the assistance of a lay appointee of the emperor as a sort of superintendent who oversaw the validity of the acts.

== Legacy ==
Peter unintentionally caused the "Ukrainization" of the Russian Church, inviting Ukrainian and Belarusian clergy (mostly graduates of the Kiev Academy) from the buffer regions of the empire into Russia. All the members of the first session of the Most Holy Synod in 1721 were Ukrainian churchmen, including the Metropolitan Stephen Yavorsky, who had been the administrator or locum tenens of the Patriarchate of Moscow for over twenty years (1700–1721), and Theophan Prokopovich. As a result of this, by the middle of the 18th century the majority of the Russian Orthodox Church was headed by people from Ukraine (Little Russia or Galicia). Between 1700 and 1762, out of the 127 hierarchs who headed cathedrals in Russia 70 were from Ukraine and only 47 from other regions of Russia. Due to Peter's suspicions against the Great Russian clergy of being attached to the pre-reform era, Little Russians (Ukrainians) were imposed in every Archbishop and Archimandrite position, where they modified all Russian church practices to conform to the distinct Ukrainian customs. Ukrainian bishops established throughout Russia church schools where Ukrainian lecturers taught Latin theology, sometimes only speaking in Ukrainian. The inflow of Ruthenian clergy continued to fill the ranks of Russia's hierarchs for more than a century after the 1654 Pereiaslav Agreement.

Monasteries lost territory and were more closely regulated, resulting in a reduction in the number of monks and nuns in Russia from roughly 25,000 in 1734 to around 14,000 in 1738.

The Church — particularly monasteries — lost land and wealth gradually during the seventeenth and eighteenth centuries, but under Empress Catherine II ("Catherine the Great", r. 1762–1796), monastic lands were effectively nationalised, with some one million peasants on monastery land becoming state serfs practically overnight. A new ecclesiastic educational system was begun under Peter the Great and expanded to the point that by the end of the century there was a seminary in each eparchy (diocese). However, the curriculum for the clergy heavily emphasised Latin language and subjects, closer to the curriculum of Jesuit academies in Poland, focusing lightly on the Greek language and the Eastern Church Fathers, and lighter still on the Russian and Slavonic church languages. This resulted in more monks and priests being formally educated than before, but receiving poor training in preparation for a ministry to a Russian-speaking population steeped in the traditions of Eastern Orthodoxy. Catherine even made sure that the salaries of all ranks of the clergy were paid by the state instead of the Church, resulting in the clergy effectively becoming employees of the state.

The Russian patriarchate was not restored until 1917, when the All-Russian Local Council of the Russian Church elected Tikhon as the new patriarch of Moscow. Although several commissions of the Synod had planned for a church council since 1905, Emperor Nicholas II believed a council would be destabilizing. After the February Revolution and the abdication of the emperor on 15 March, the Synodal higher church authority under the provisional government convened the council, which opened on 28 August [O.S. 15 August], the Dormition of the Virgin. The assembly continued meeting despite the onset of the October Revolution, electing Patriarch Tikhon on 5 November 1917. Many other issues were deliberated and decided, including decentralizing the church administration, allowing women to participate in church governance, and determining that priests and laity would have a voice in church councils alongside bishops. The Petrine Synodal higher church authority and the ober-procurator were abolished forever.

== See also ==
- Kingdom of the Slavs
- Government reform of Peter the Great
- History of the Russian Orthodox Church
- History of Russia (1721–1796)
- Caesaropapism
