= Ecclesiastical polity =

Government of Christian churches

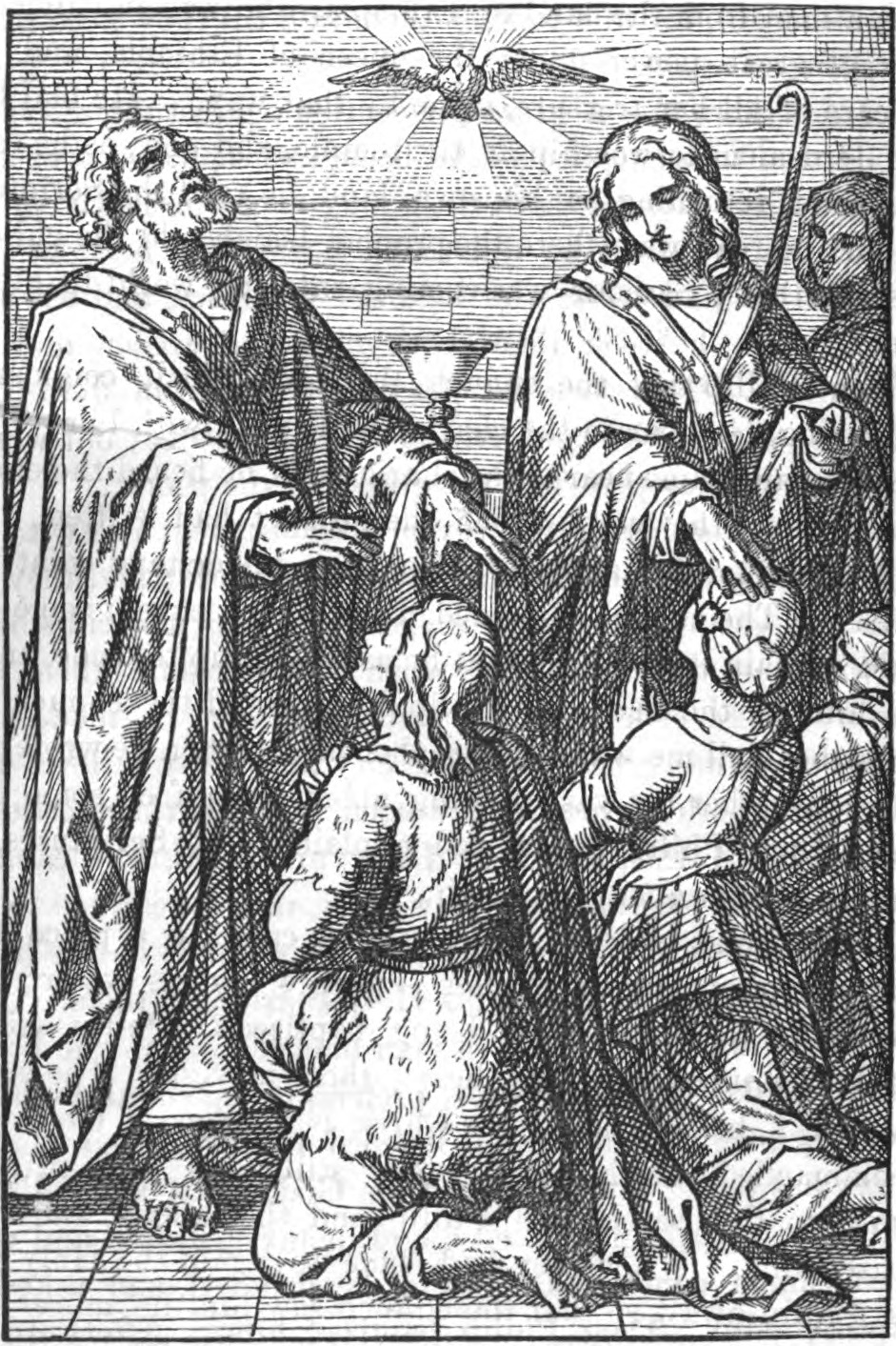
The apostles Peter and John laying hands in ordination. Illustration, 1873.

Ecclesiastical polity is the government of a church. There are local (congregational) forms of organization as well as denominational. A church's polity may describe its ministerial offices or an authority structure between churches. Polity relates closely to ecclesiology, the theological study of the church.

== History ==
Questions of church government were documented early on in the first chapters of the Acts of the Apostles and "theological debate about the nature, location, and exercise of authority, in the church" has been ongoing ever since. The first act recorded after the Ascension of Jesus Christ was the election of Saint Matthias as one of the Twelve Apostles, to replace Judas Iscariot.

During the Protestant Reformation, reformers asserted that the New Testament prescribed an ecclesiastical government different from the episcopal polity maintained by the Catholic Church, and consequently different Protestant bodies organized into different types of polities. During this period, Richard Hooker wrote Of the Laws of Ecclesiastical Polity, the first volumes of which were published in 1594, to defend the polity of the Church of England against Puritan objections. It is from the title of this work that the term ecclesiastical polity may have originated. With respect to ecclesiology, Hooker preferred the term polity to government as the former term "containeth both [the] government and also whatsoever besides belongeth to the ordering of the Church in public."

== Types ==
There are four general types of polity: episcopal, connexional, presbyterian, and congregational.

=== Episcopal polity ===
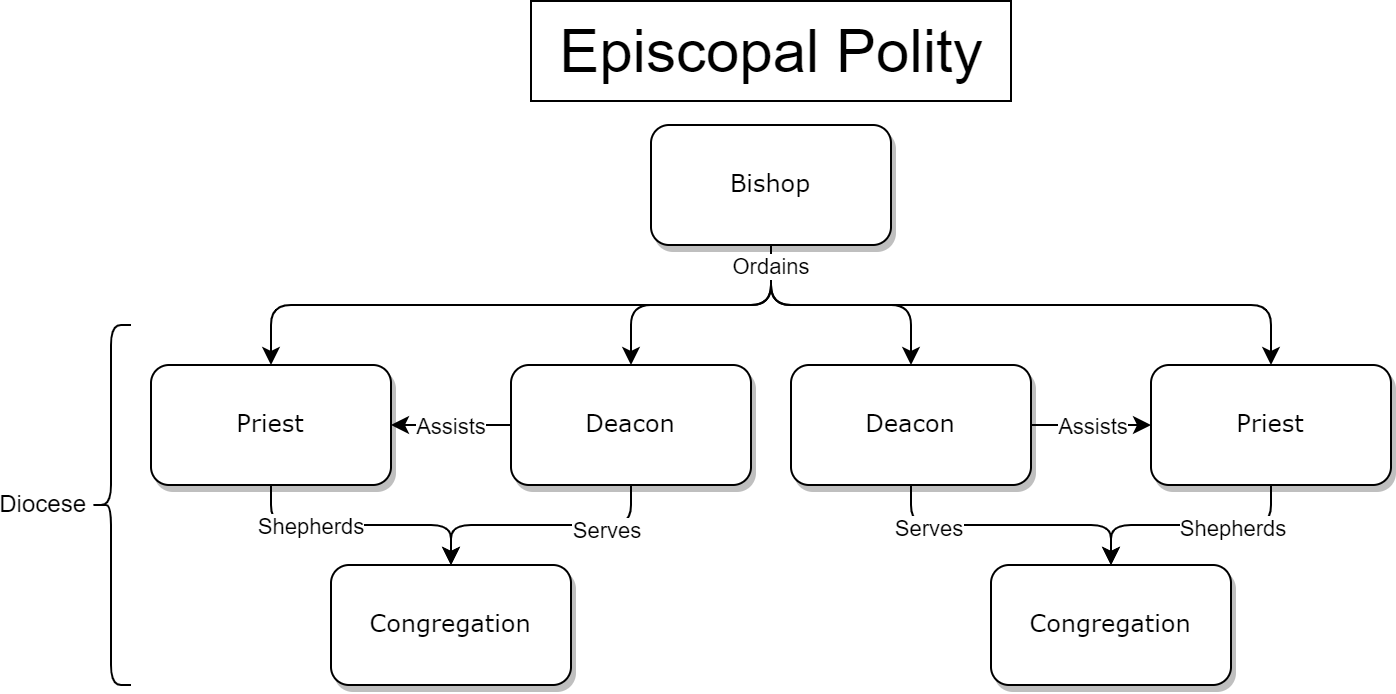
A diagram of episcopal polity.

Churches having episcopal polity are governed by bishops. The title bishop comes from the Greek word epískopos, which translates as overseer. In the Catholic Church, bishops have authority over the diocese, which is both sacramental and political; as well as performing ordinations, confirmations, and consecrations, the bishop supervises the clergy of the diocese and represents the diocese both secularly and in the hierarchy of church governance.

Bishops may be subject to higher ranking bishops (variously called archbishops, metropolitans, primates, patriarchs, catholicoses or popes depending upon the tradition; see article Bishop) They also meet in councils or synods. These synods, subject to precedency by higher ranking bishops, may govern the dioceses which are represented in the council, though the synod may also be purely advisory. In episcopal polity, presbyter (elder) refers to a priest.

Churches governed by episcopacy do not simply adhere to a chain of command. Instead, some authority may be held by synods and colleges of bishops, and other authority by lay and clerical councils. Patterns of authority are subject to a wide variety of historical rights and honours which may cut across simple lines of authority.

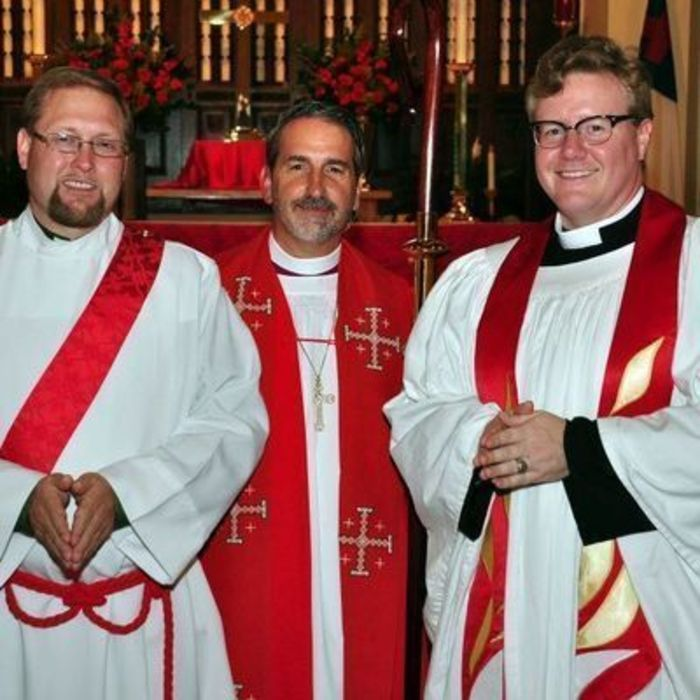
An Anglican deacon, bishop and priest. Priests are usually former deacons in episcopal polity.

Episcopal polity is the predominant pattern in Catholic, Eastern Orthodox, Oriental Orthodox, and Anglican churches. It is common in some Methodist and Lutheran churches, as well as amongst some of the African-American Pentecostal traditions such as the Church of God in Christ and the Full Gospel Baptist Church Fellowship.

=== Connexional polity ===
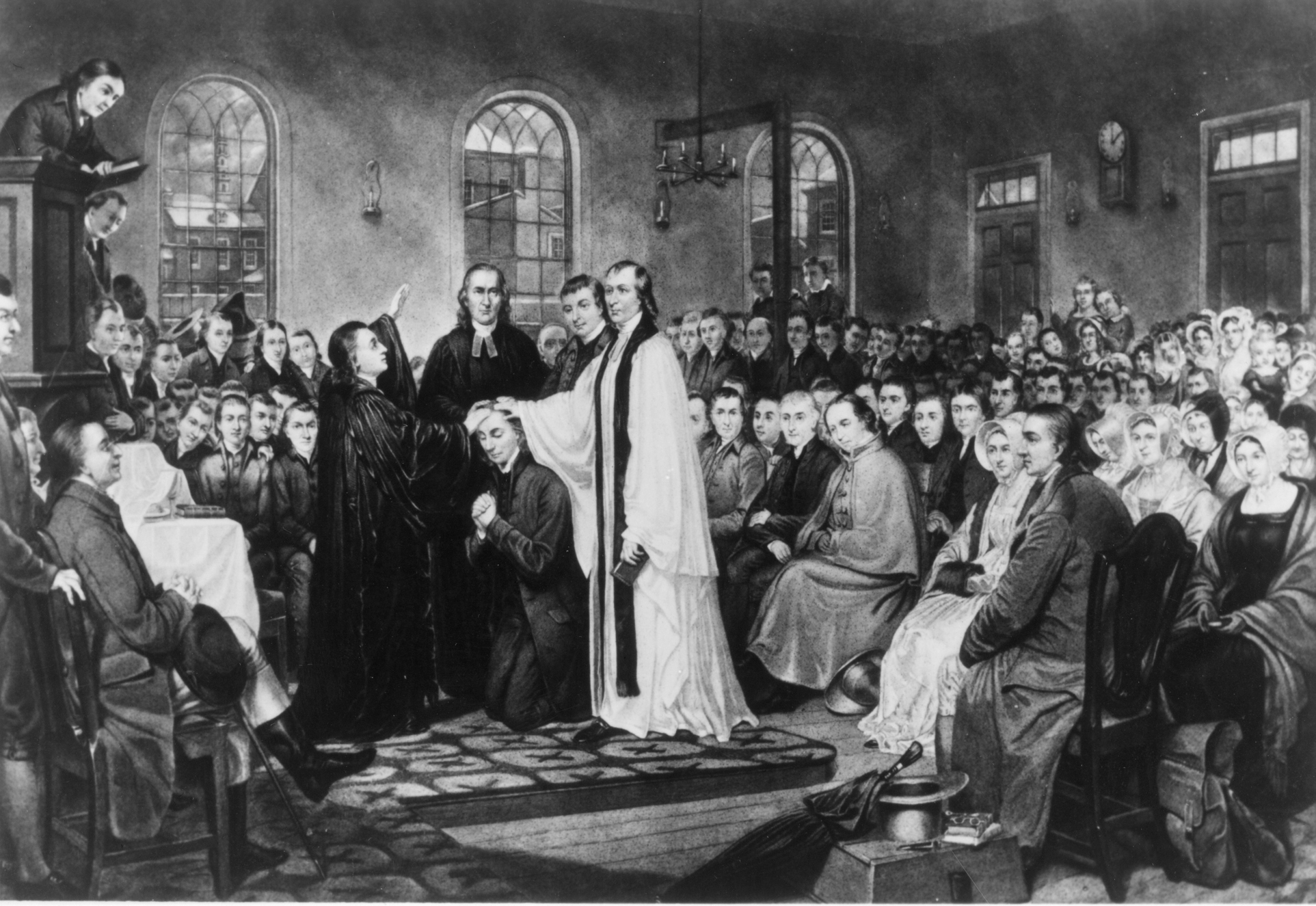
The ordination of Methodist Bishop Francis Asbury, 1784.

Many Methodist and Wesleyan churches use a derivative of episcopalianism known as connexional polity. It emphasizes essential interdependence through fellowship, consultation, government and oversight. Some Methodist churches have bishops, but those individuals are not nearly as powerful as in episcopal churches.

Connexionalism is sometimes identified as an organization, while other times as relationship or theological principle. The United Methodist Church defines connection as the principle that "all leaders and congregations are connected in a network of loyalties and commitments that support, yet supersede, local concerns."

A minority of Methodist denominations use another non-connexional form of government, such as the Congregational Methodist Church.

=== Presbyterian polity ===
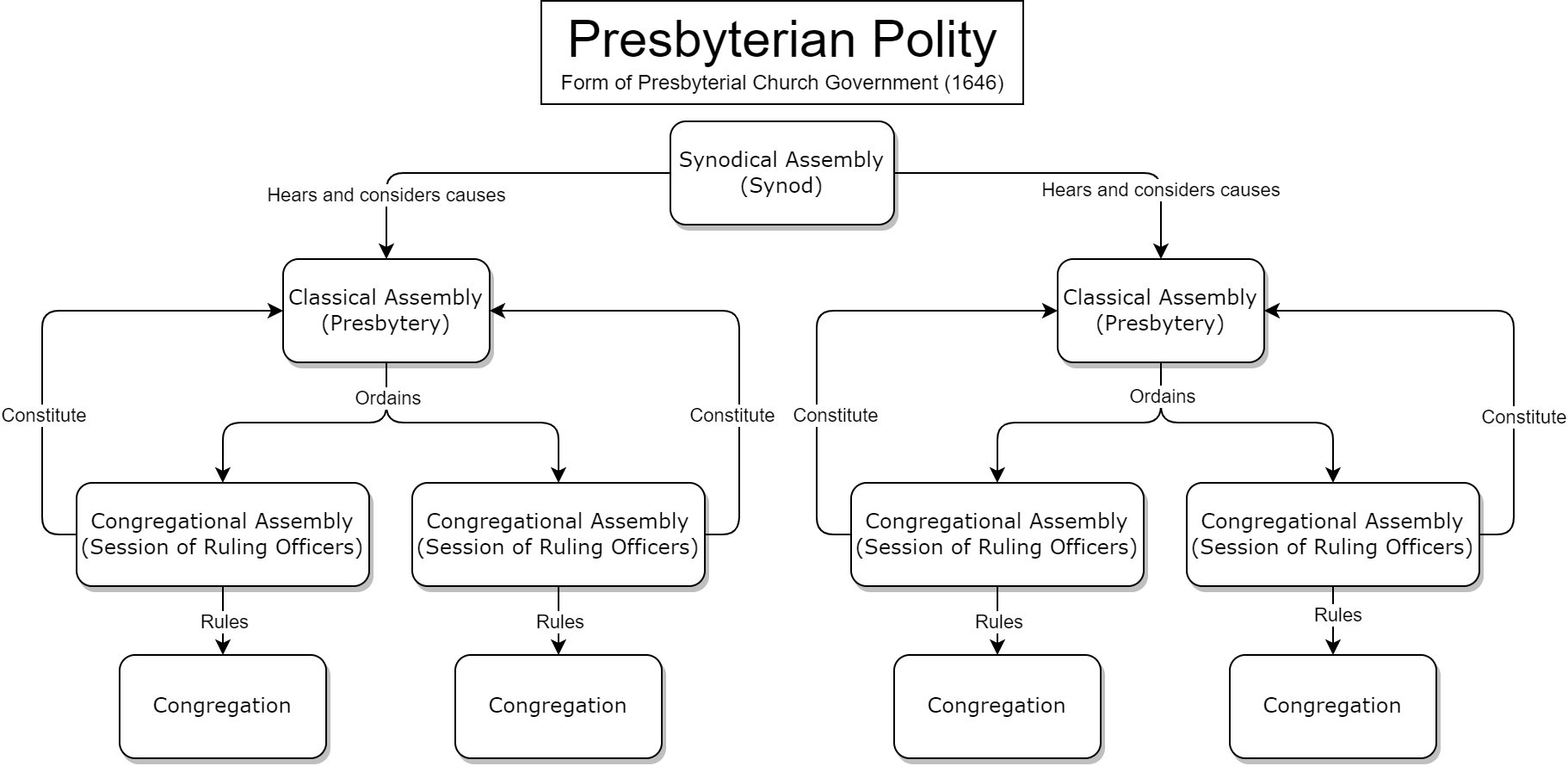
A diagram of presbyterian polity according to The Form of Presbyterial Church Government (1646).

Many Reformed churches are governed by a hierarchy of councils (or courts). The lowest level council governs a single local church and is called the session or consistory; its members are called elders. The minister of the church (sometimes referred to as a teaching elder) is a member of and presides over the session; lay representatives (ruling elders or, informally, just elders) are elected by the congregation. The session sends representatives to the next level higher council, called the presbytery or classis. In some Presbyterian churches there are higher level councils (synods or general assemblies). Each council has authority over its constituents, and the representatives at each level are expected to use their own judgment. For example, each session approves and installs its own elders, and each presbytery approves the ministers serving within its territory and the connections between those ministers and particular congregations. Hence higher level councils act as courts of appeal for church trials and disputes, and it is not uncommon to see rulings and decisions overturned.

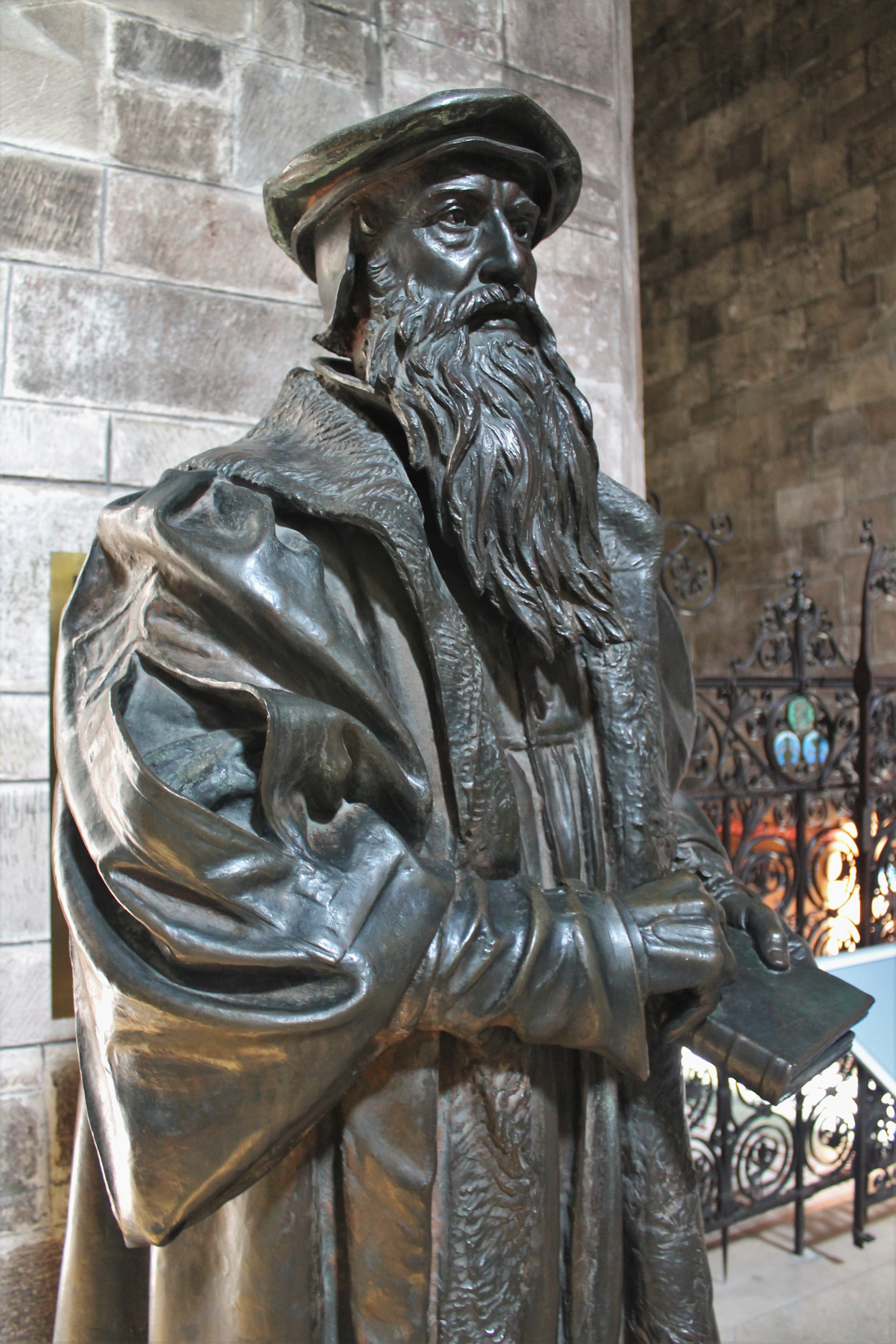
Cathedral churches like St. Andrews were incompatible with the presbyterian polity taught by John Knox. This statue stands in St. Giles, still called a cathedral despite no longer serving as an episcopal seat.

Presbyterian polity and the Presbyterian tradition are not identical. Continental reformed churches (e.g. Dutch) can also be described as presbyterian, with a few key differences. Continental churches that historically follow the Church Order of Dordrecht (1618/1619) will, in general, consider their levels of government "broader" rather than "higher" courts. Additionally, the reformed classis is a temporary, delegated body, so the minister is firstly a member of his congregation as opposed to the standing presbytery.

The Episcopal Church in the United States of America arguably contains a kind of lay presbyterian polity. Governance by bishops is paralleled by a system of deputies, who are lay and clerical representatives elected by parishes and, at the national level, by the dioceses. Legislation in the general convention requires the separate consent of the bishops and of the deputies.

=== Congregational polity ===
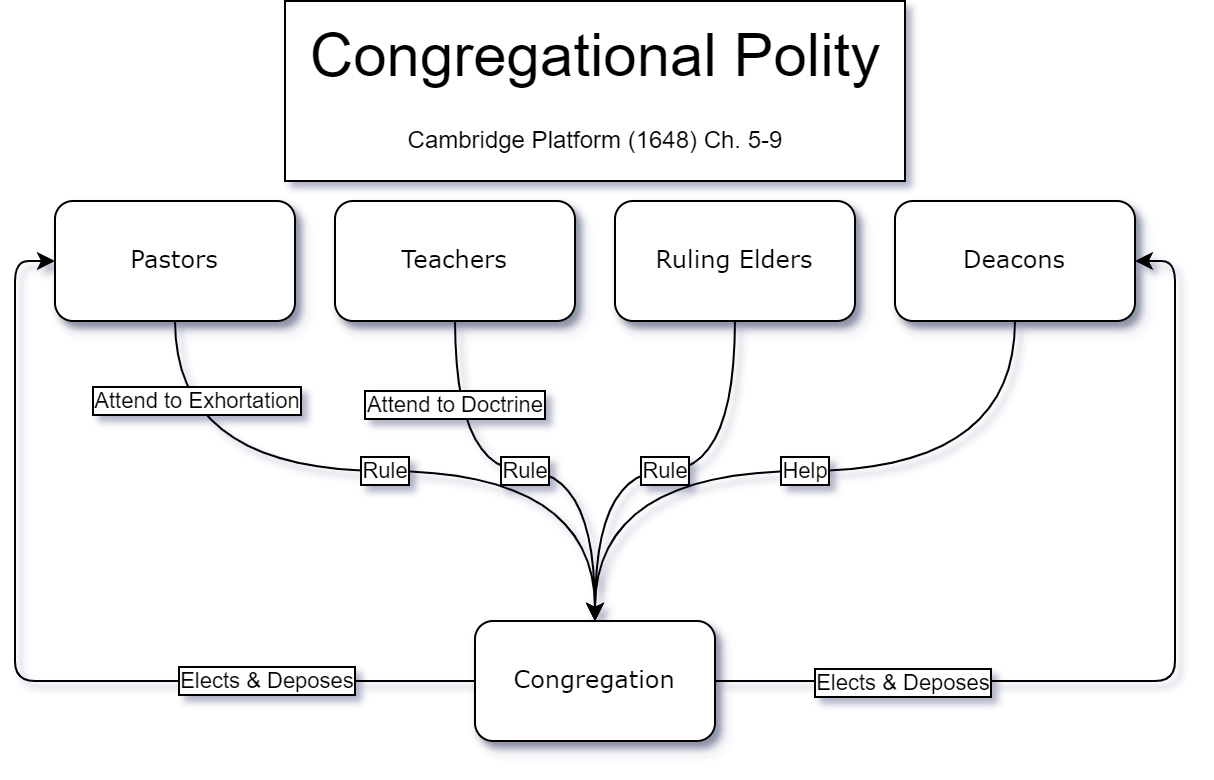
A diagram of congregational polity according to the Cambridge Platform (1648).

Congregational polity is historically reformed, like presbyterianism, but retains the autonomy (lit. self-rule) of the local church. Congregational churches dispense with such titles as "Popes, Patriarchs, Cardinals, Arch-Bishops, Lord-Bishops, Arch-Deacons, Officials, Commissaries, and the like" as unlawful and a "dishonor of Christ Jesus". The congregation has its being without any ministers and is enabled to elect and install its own officers. Ordination may involve officers of other churches, especially when the church participates in a local vicinage, association, or convention. Broader assemblies formed by delegates from congregationally governed churches (e.g. the Southern Baptist Convention) do not have power to rule their constituents.

The number of offices in the church generally ranges from two (elder & deacon) to four (pastor, teacher, ruling elder & deacon) in congregational churches.

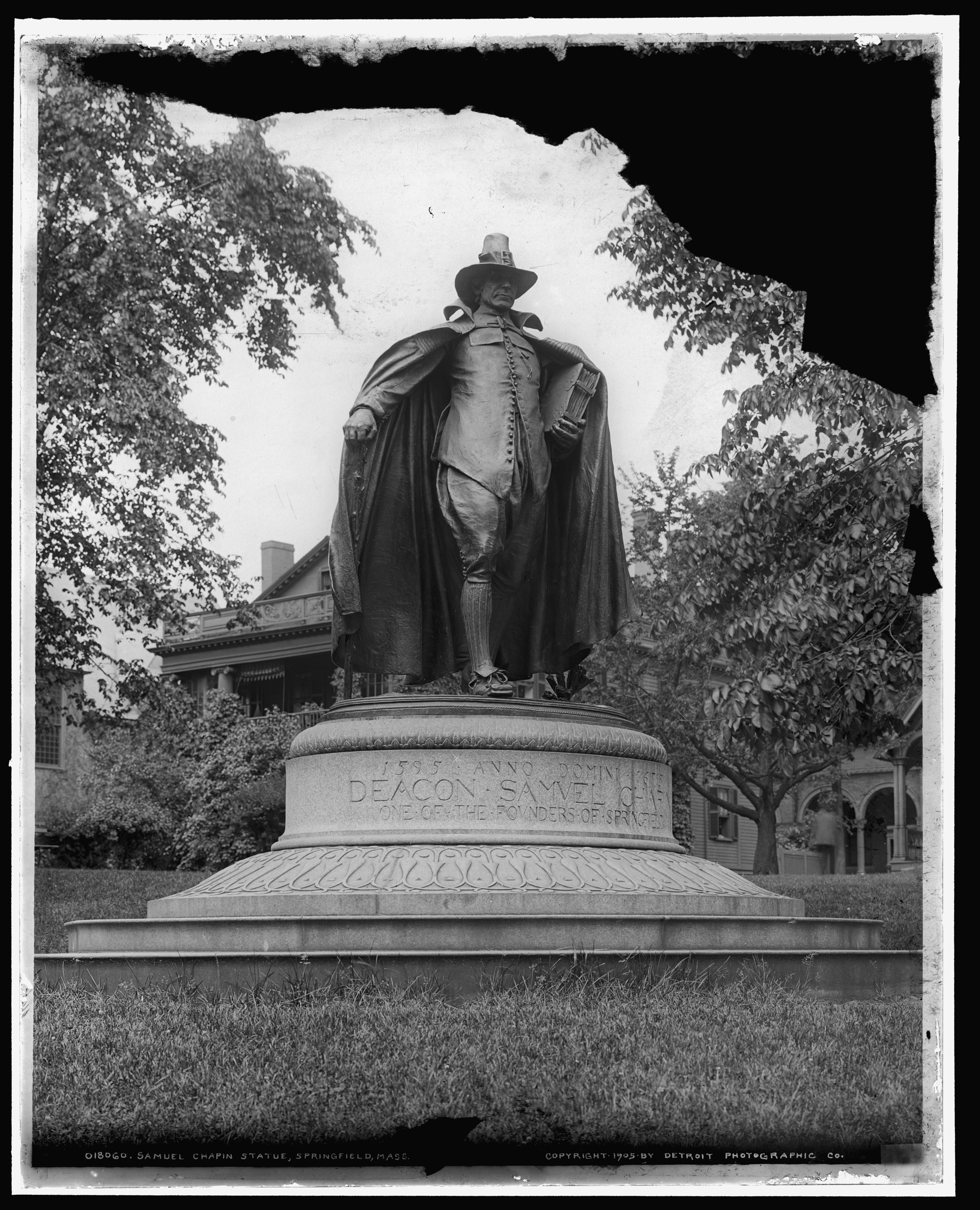
"Deacon Samuel Chapin", who held office in congregational First Church in Roxbury, Massachusetts Bay Colony.

Churches with congregational polity include Congregationalists, Baptists, Quakers and much of Non-denominational Christianity. Congregational polity is sometimes called Baptist polity because of the relative prevalence of Baptists.

Historic statements of congregational polity include the Cambridge Platform, Savoy Declaration, Saybrook Platform and Second London Confession.

As a "self-governed voluntary institution", it could be considered a type of religious anarchism.

=== Other forms ===
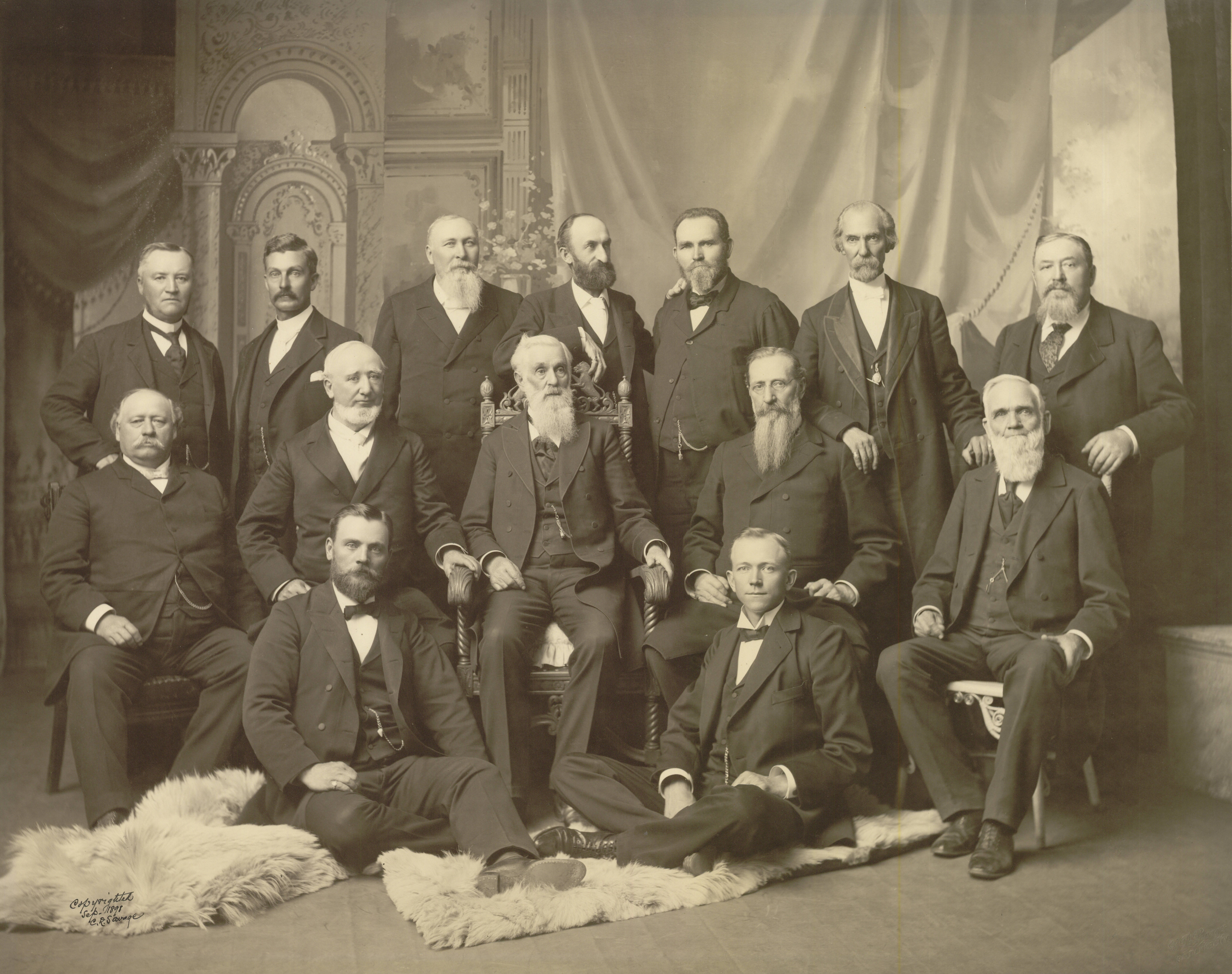
The LDS Church is governed by a President and Quorum of Twelve Apostles.

Other religious organizations, for example Seventh-day Adventist, Jehovah's Witnesses, the Salvation Army, and the Church of Jesus Christ of Latter-day Saints (LDS Church), are unique. Some have hierarchies similar to an episcopal polity, but may be more complex, with additional levels. Leaders are not always called bishops, in some cases they have secular-like titles such as president or overseer. The term bishop may be used to describe functionaries in minor leadership roles, such as a leader of an individual congregation; it may also be used as an honorific, particularly within the Holiness movement.

== Polity, autonomy, and ecumenism ==
Although a church's polity determines its ministers and discipline, it need not affect relations with other Christian organizations. The unity of a church is an essential doctrine of ecclesiology, but because the divisions between churches presuppose the absence of mutual authority, internal polity does not directly answer how these divisions are treated.

For example, among churches of episcopal polity, different theories are expressed:

- In Eastern Orthodoxy, the various churches retain autonomy but are held to be unified by common doctrine and conciliarity, i. e., subjection to the authority of councils, such as ecumenical councils, Holy Synods, and the former standing council, the Endemusa Synod.
- The Roman Catholic Church understands itself as a single polity whose supreme earthly authority is the Supreme Pontiff (Pope).
- In Anglicanism, the churches are autonomous, though the majority of members are organizationally united in the Anglican Communion, which has no governmental authority.

== Plurality and singularity ==
A plurality of elders is considered desirable in some (esp. reformed) traditions, preferring two or more officers in the local church. This contrasts with singular models often found in Catholic, Eastern Orthodox, and Anglican churches, or the "pastor/president" system of some Protestant churches. This is commonly encouraged among Presbyterians, some Pentecostal churches, Churches of Christ, the Disciples of Christ, Baptists and the Plymouth Brethren. Advocates claim biblical precedent, citing that New Testament churches appear to all have had multiple elders.

Conversely, one minister may serve in two roles. A pastor with two churches may be said to have a "dual charge". In the Church of England, two or more otherwise independent benefices may be 'held in plurality' by a single priest.

== See also ==
- Hierarchy of the Catholic Church
- Organizational structure of Jehovah's Witnesses
- Polity of the Seventh-day Adventist Church
