= Most Holy Synod =

Governing body of the Russian Orthodox Church (1721–1917)

- Святѣйшій Правительствующій Сѵнодъ
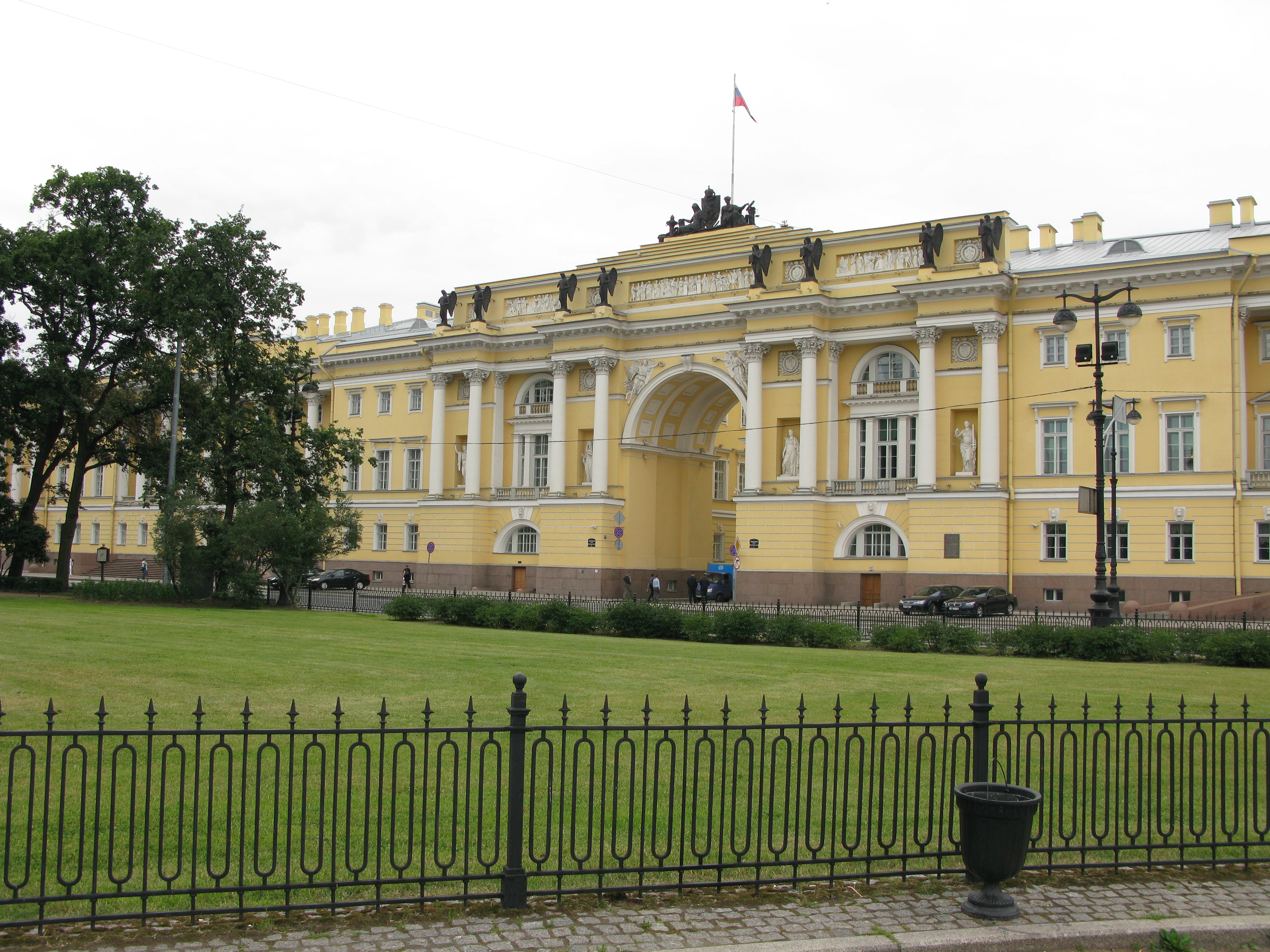
- Headquarters of the Holy Synod of the Russian Empire in St. Petersburg
- Successor: Holy Synod of the Russian Orthodox Church
- Formation: January 25, 1721
- Founder: Peter I of Russia
- Dissolved: 1917
- Type: Governing body
- Purpose: Highest governing body of the Russian Orthodox Church
- Region served: Russia
- Members: 10-12

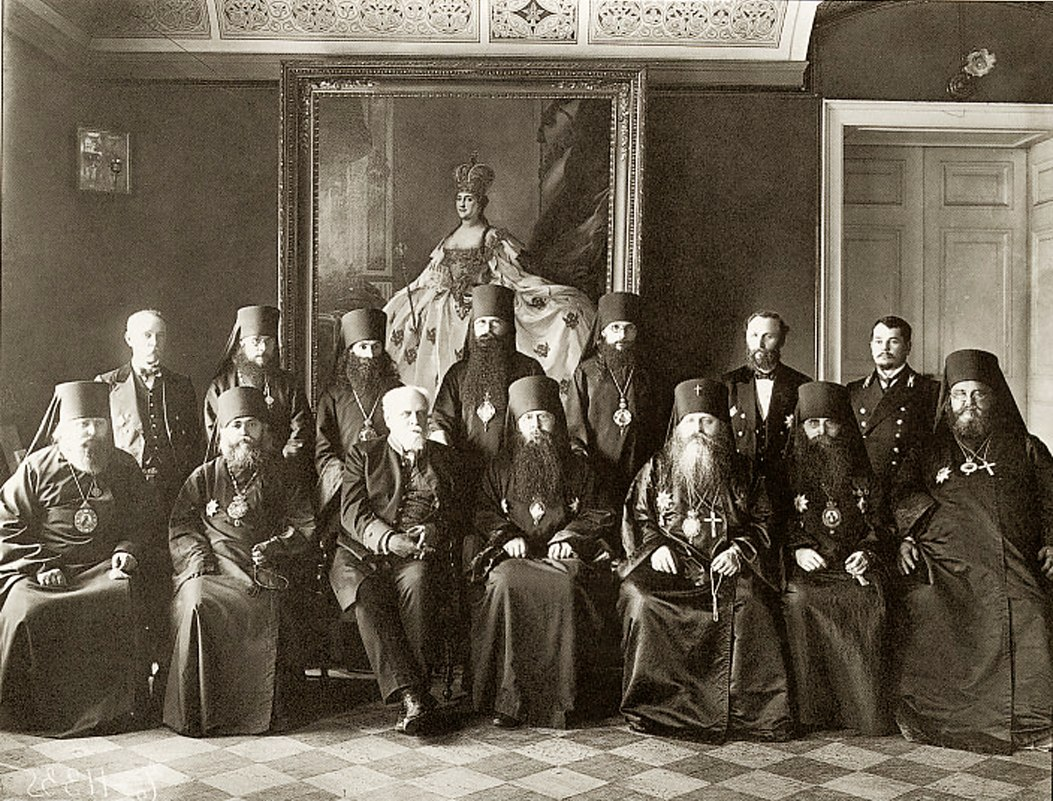
The participants of the Extraordinary Meeting of the Holy Synod on July 26, 1911 in the main hall of the Metropolitan Housing in Alexander Nevsky Lavra.

The Most Holy Governing Synod (Russian: Святейший Правительствующий Синод, romanized: Svyateyshiy Pravitel'stvuyushchiy Sinod, pre-reform orthography: Святѣйшій Правительствующій Сѵнодъ, Svyatěyshìy Pravitel'stvuyushchìy Sÿnod) was the highest governing body of the Russian Orthodox Church between 1721 and 1917. It was abolished following the February Revolution of 1917 and replaced with a restored patriarchate under Tikhon of Moscow. The jurisdiction of the Most Holy Synod extended over every kind of ecclesiastical question and over some partly secular matters.

Peter I of Russia established the Synod on January 25, 1721 in the course of his church reform. Its establishment was followed by the abolition of the Patriarchate. The synod was composed partly of ecclesiastical persons, partly of laymen appointed by the Tsar. Members included the Metropolitans of Saint Petersburg, Moscow and Kiev, and the Exarch of Georgia. Originally, the Synod had ten ecclesiastical members, but the number later changed to twelve.

== Background ==
A series of reforms by Peter the Great inspired the creation of the Most Holy Synod. The new Imperial Age saw radical change and developments in economic, social and cultural aspects of Russian life. Peter traveled twice to Europe and made reforms that reflected his desire to westernize Russia and worked to Russify the European models to better fit his nation. Beyond forming the synod in an effort to enfeeble the power and authority of the Russian Orthodox Church, he also challenged traditional Russian values, which were rooted in religion and a social structure defined by boyars and aristocracy, merchants, clerics, peasants and serfs. He did so by implementing enlightenment ideals—except for any that would have resulted in democratizing the Russian government, tolerating political or religious dissent, or encouraging the free growth of thought or ideas; establishing the Julian calendar; reorganizing the Russian army in the European style; establishing a meritocracy (as opposed to the previous system of delineating positions by aristocratic lineage); outlawing or taxing beards (which were common among the Old Believers); etc. Peter's desire for the consolidation and standardization of authority led to the creation of the synod. With one leader (the patriarch) the church proved too great of a threat to Peter's rule, and he was unwilling to share power.

== Road to the Synod ==
When the conservative Patriarch Adrian died in 1700, Peter left the position unfilled and instead Archbishop Stephen Yavorsky, a supporter of reform, administered the church for roughly twenty years. In 1721 the church officially came under the cloak of the Russian national government with the Spiritual Order, which was ostensibly written primarily by Archbishop Theophan Prokopovich.

After Patriarch Adrian died, Peter, through the inspiration and encouragement of his official A.A. Kurbatov, decided to abolish the patriarchal Razryadnyi Prikaz (rank prikaz), which was in charge of civil and military administration, and redirected all matters to the appropriate prikaz, an administrative or judicial office. This event and others demonstrated that little by little, Peter's administration rendered each church division powerless and their duties transferred to paralleled governmental departments. Some scholars argue, though, that Peter did not intend to abolish the Patriarchate when he began altering the administrative structure of the church. Delaying choosing a new patriarch proved economically advantageous; by restricting ecclesiastic land ownership and other financial luxuries of the clergy, the state saved money. This gave Peter further incentive to abolish the Patriarchy.

In 1711, reform allotted the Senate jurisdiction over all peoples, including ecclesiastical subjects. This meant that the state now had authority over issues that had been previously reserved for church authorities. With this power came the ability, in certain situations, for the state to determine clerics for administration in religious positions.

In 1716 Peter formulated an oath for the bishops-elect of Vologda and Astrakhan and Yavorskii. The oath, divided into seven parts, served as a supplement to the present oath. The first two parts regard the appropriate method for dealing with heretics and oppositionists. The third section designates that monks of their dioceses were not to travel outside diocese limits, unless for an urgent matter, and only then with written permission. The oath prohibited the building of any unnecessary churches (point 4) and the hiring on of any unessential clerics (point 5). The oath required clergy to visit their diocese at least once a year in order to dispel superstition or apostates and to congregate believers (point 6). Finally, the oath compelled bishops to swear that they would not become involved in secular affairs or legal proceedings.

== Peter's attitude towards the Church ==
Peter was determined to westernize Russia during his reign, and the church was an integral part of his campaign. As mentioned earlier, the new structure of the church in many ways resembled that which was current in European countries with established churches, such as Sweden and Germany. In a broader sense, though, Peter was attempting to modernize Russia through secularization, which was a vital step in the course of European political modernization during this time. Secularization, in this instance, meant the institutionalization and expansion of the state's wealth and authority coupled with the dwindling power of the church. The church was made politically subject to the government, instead of the traditional relationship between church and state, in which rulers, such as Ivan IV, felt in some ways subject to the approval of the Orthodox Church in order to remain a legitimate sovereign.

Peter used the Synod to find and punish dissident Russians. An addition in 1722 to the Ecclesiastic Regulation, which replaced the patriarch as the church head, required clerics to report any seditious confessions.

Before the creation of the Most Holy Synod, Peter was concerned personally with improvements in the church. He was particularly interested in improving the education of the clerics, since many were illiterate and unable to administer sacraments.

At the time Peter established the synod, he also issued the Spiritual Order, mentioned above. One key aspect of this edict was that it disregarded or denied the divinity of the church and characterized it as a state institution.

== Formation ==
The Holy Synod replaced the job of the patriarch with ten, and later twelve, clerics. The chief procurator (Ober-Prokuror), the first of whom was Colonel I. V. Boltin, oversaw the synod in order to verify the legality of their actions and the prompt and orderly fulfillment of their responsibilities. Peter required priests to report traitorous confessions, but he did not push his ability to control to the limit; for example, he refrained from secularizing church lands. Under the synod, the church became more tolerant of various denominations, even extending this policy to the Old Believers for a period of time. Intermarriage between Orthodox and Western Christians was permitted starting in the year of the Synod's formation.

The synod was intended, presumably, to mirror the church-state relationship in the Lutheran countries of northern Europe. Although the emperor did not wield authority in matters of faith, the government effectively controlled organization, finances and policies of the church. Believing that the government should play an active role in the lives of citizens, Peter expected the church to do the same. He directed the church to form public welfare projects for the benefit of the common people. These included almshouses and Christian schools.

In November 1718, Peter formed an Ecclesiastical College in St. Petersburg, as it was the center of civil government. Soon, its name was changed to "Most Holy All-Ruling Synod".

== Duties ==
The synod functioned under the Ecclesiastical Regulation statute with the goal of administrating and reforming the church. The statute stated that the eleven members of the college were to be of varying classes and ranks. One president, two vice-presidents, four councilors and four assessors comprised the council and each member would get one vote when determining a dispute.

Formed as a reaction to Peter's views of Russia as compared to Western Europe, the synod was a concentration of clerics who had received extensive formal higher education. It worked to gain as much of the disputed church property as possible, and after assuming control of the patriarchal domain the synod was accountable for the lives of 6000 people. It was to be revered absolutely in all things and possessed "patriarchal power, honour, and authority".

The primary duties of the synod were to supervise the direction of the Orthodox faith, instruct people on religious matters, celebrate feasts and determine questions of order and ritual. As mentioned before, the synod also suppressed heretics, judged miracles and relics and prevented Russian citizens from practicing witchcraft. The synod was in control of church property and was thus responsible for the creation of monasteries and churches.

== Prime Members (Chairmen) ==
- 1721–1722 Stephan (Yavorsky), Metropolitan of Ryazan
- 1722–1725 (acting) Theodosius (Yanovsky), Archbishop of Novgorod
- 1725–1726 (acting) Theophan (Prokopovich), Archbishop of Novgorod
- 1726–1736 Theophan (Prokopovich), Archbishop of Novgorod
  - 1736–1740 none
- 1740–1745 Ambrose (Yushkevich), Archbishop of Novgorod
- 1745–1753 Stephan (Kalinovsky), Archbishop of Novgorod
- 1753–1754 Platon (Malinovsky), Archbishop of Moscow
- 1754–1757 Sylvester (Kulyabka), Archbishop of Saint-Petersburg
- 1757–1767 Demetrius (Sechenov), Archbishop of Novgorod (since 1762 – Metropolitan)
- 1767–1770 Gabriel (Kremenetsky), Archbishop of Saint-Petersburg
- 1775–1799 Gabriel (Petrov), Archbishop of Novgorod (since 1783 – Metropolitan)
- 1799–1818 Ambrose (Podobedov), Archbishop of Saint-Petersburg (since 1801 – Metropolitan of Novgorod)
- 1818–1821 Michael (Desnitsky), Metropolitan of Saint-Petersburg (since 1818 – of Novgorod)
- 1821–1843 Seraphim (Glagolevsky), Metropolitan of Novgorod
- 1843–1848 Anthony (Rafalsky), Metropolitan of Novgorod
- 1848–1856 Nicanor (Klementievsky), Metropolitan of Novgorod
- 1856–1860 Gregory (Postnikov), Metropolitan of Saint-Petersburg
- 1860–1892 Isidore (Nikolsky), Metropolitan of Novgorod
- 1892–1898 Palladius (Rayev), Metropolitan of Saint-Petersburg
- 1898–1900 Joannicius (Rudnev), Metropolitan of Kiev
- 1900–1912 Anthony (Vadkovsky), Metropolitan of Saint-Petersburg
- 1912–1917 Vladimir (Bogoyavlensky), Metropolitan of Saint-Petersburg, (since 1915 – of Kiev)
- 1917–1917 Platon (Rozhdestvensky), Archbishop of Kartli and Kakheti, Exarch of Georgia (later – Metropolitan of Tbilisi and Baku)

== See also ==
- Holy Synod
- Holy Synod of the Russian Orthodox Church

== Sources ==
- Statesman's handbook for Russia. 1896.
- Cracraft, James. "Diplomatic and Bureaucratic Revolutions, Revolutions and Resistance." The Revolution of Peter the Great. Cambridge, Massachusetts: Harvard University Press, 2003. 60-65, 120-130. Print.
- Cracraft, James. The Church Reform of Peter the Great. Stanford, CA: Stanford UP, 1971. Print.
- Krindatch, Alexey. "Changing relationships between Religion, the State, and Society in Russia." GeoJournal 67.4 (2006): 267-282. Print.
- Riasanovsky, Nicholas Valentine, and Mark D. Steinberg. "The Reign of Peter the Great." A History of Russia. Vol. I. New York: Oxford University Press, 2011. 211-29. Print.
- The Catholic Encyclopedia volume 7, entry by Adrian Fortescue, publisher: Robert Appleton Company, 1910.
