= Holy Synod =

Body in several Eastern Orthodox and Eastern Catholic churches

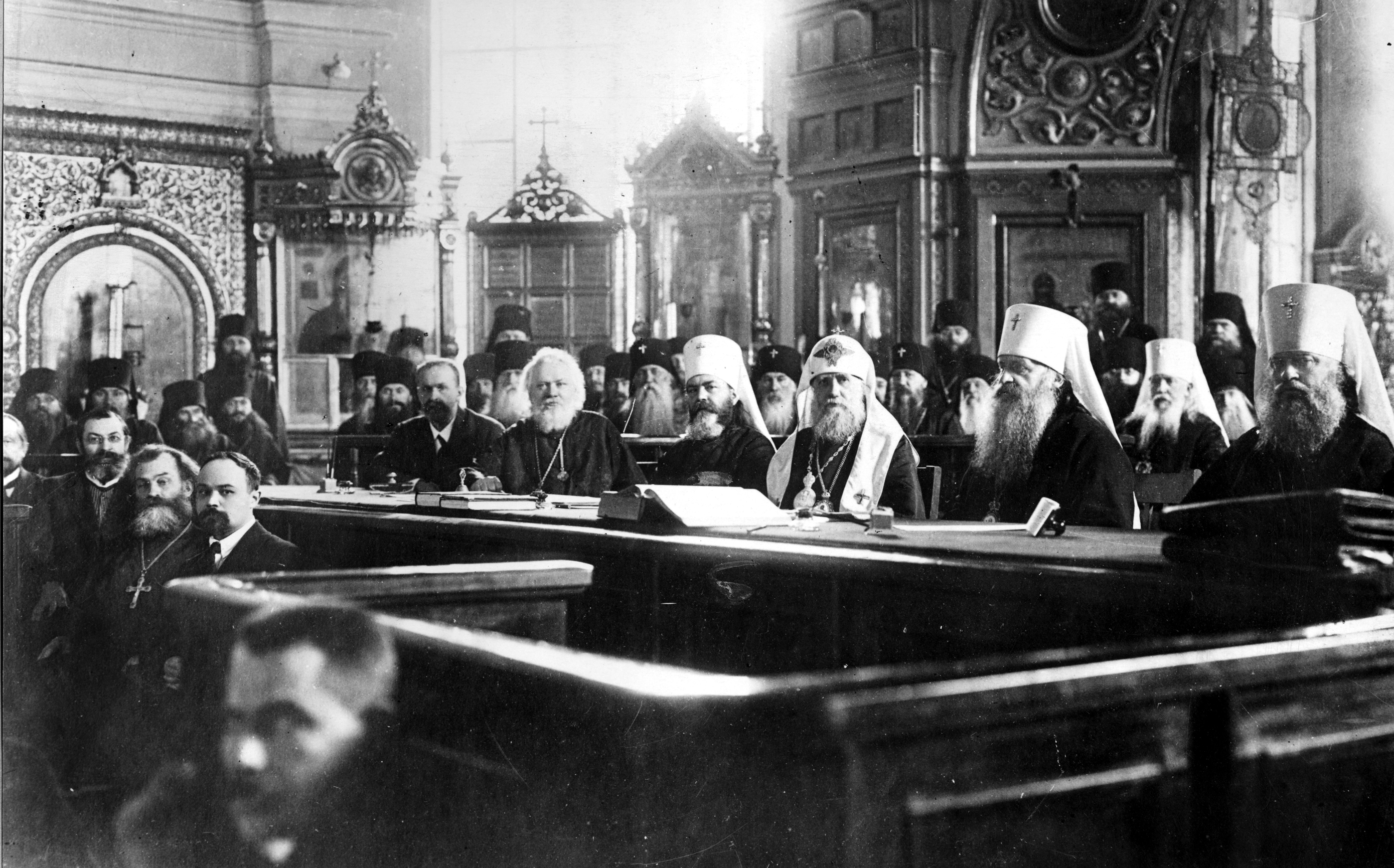
The Most Holy Governing Synod, highest authority of the Russian Orthodox Church in 1917, immediately after the election of the new patriarch

In several of the autocephalous Eastern Orthodox churches and Eastern Catholic Churches, the patriarch or head bishop is elected by a group of bishops called the Holy Synod. For instance, the Holy Synod is a ruling body of the Georgian Orthodox Church.

In Oriental Orthodoxy the Holy Synod is the highest authority in the church and it formulates the rules and regulations regarding matters of church organization, faith, and order of service.

== Early synods ==
The principle of summoning a synod or council of ecclesiastical persons to discuss some grave question affecting the Church goes back to the very beginning of the Church's history. Since the day when the Apostles met at Jerusalem to settle whether Gentile converts were to keep the Old Law (Acts 15:6–29), it had been the custom to call together such gatherings as occasion required. Bishops summoned synods of their clergy, metropolitans and patriarchs summoned their suffragans, and then since 325 there was a succession of those greatest synods, representing the whole Catholic world, that are known as general councils.

== Eastern Orthodox Church ==
=== Synod of the Ecumenical Patriarchate ===
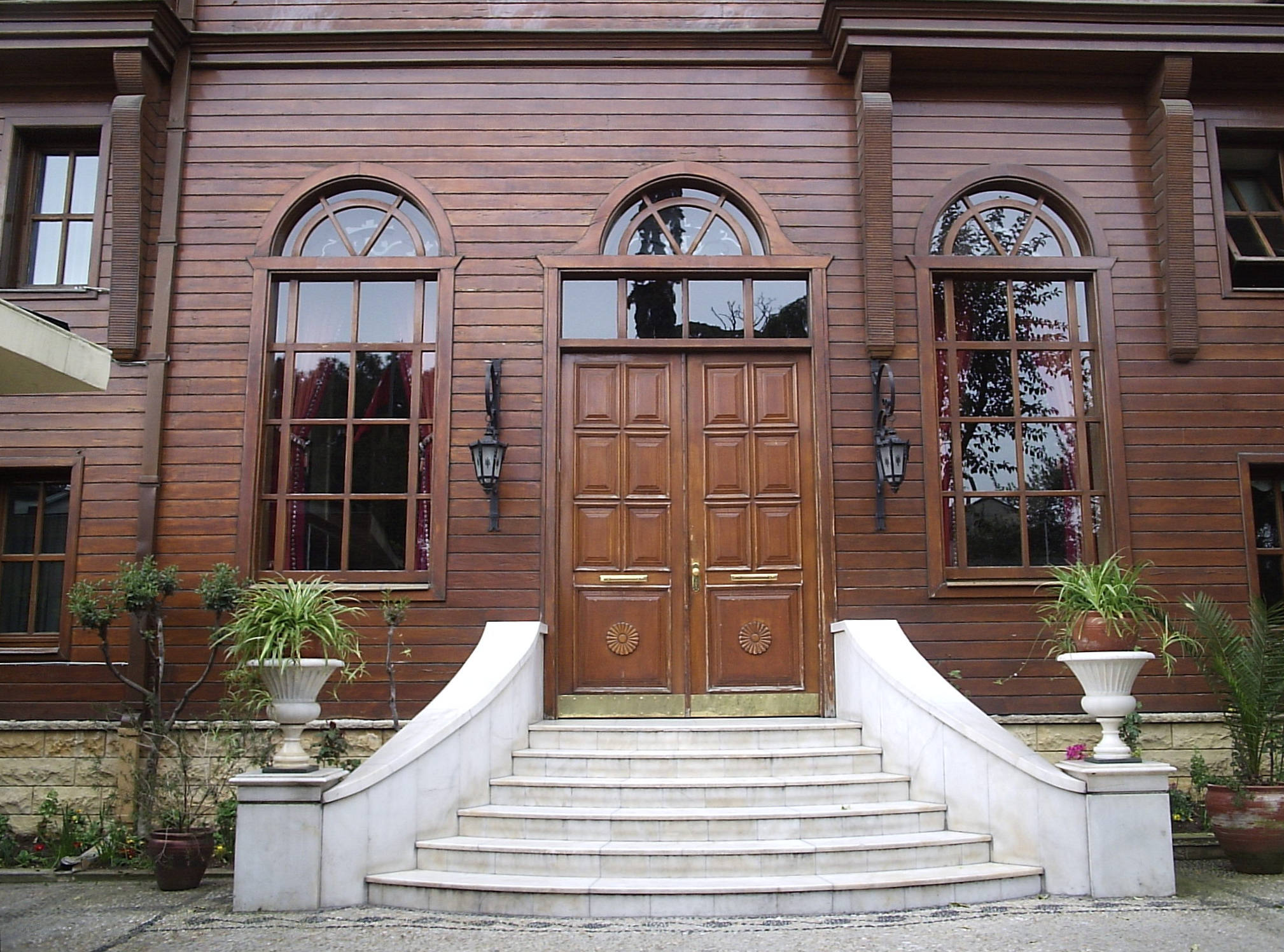
Ecumenical Patriarch's residence

The Ecumenical Patriarchate is governed by the "Holy and Sacred Synod", developed from the "endemousa synod" (the "resident" synod), which consisted of the bishops living (even if only transiently) in or near Constantinople. It is presided over by the Patriarch of Constantinople and consists of twelve hierarchs, each of whom holds membership for a year, with half of them being replaced every six months.

=== The Russian Holy Synod ===
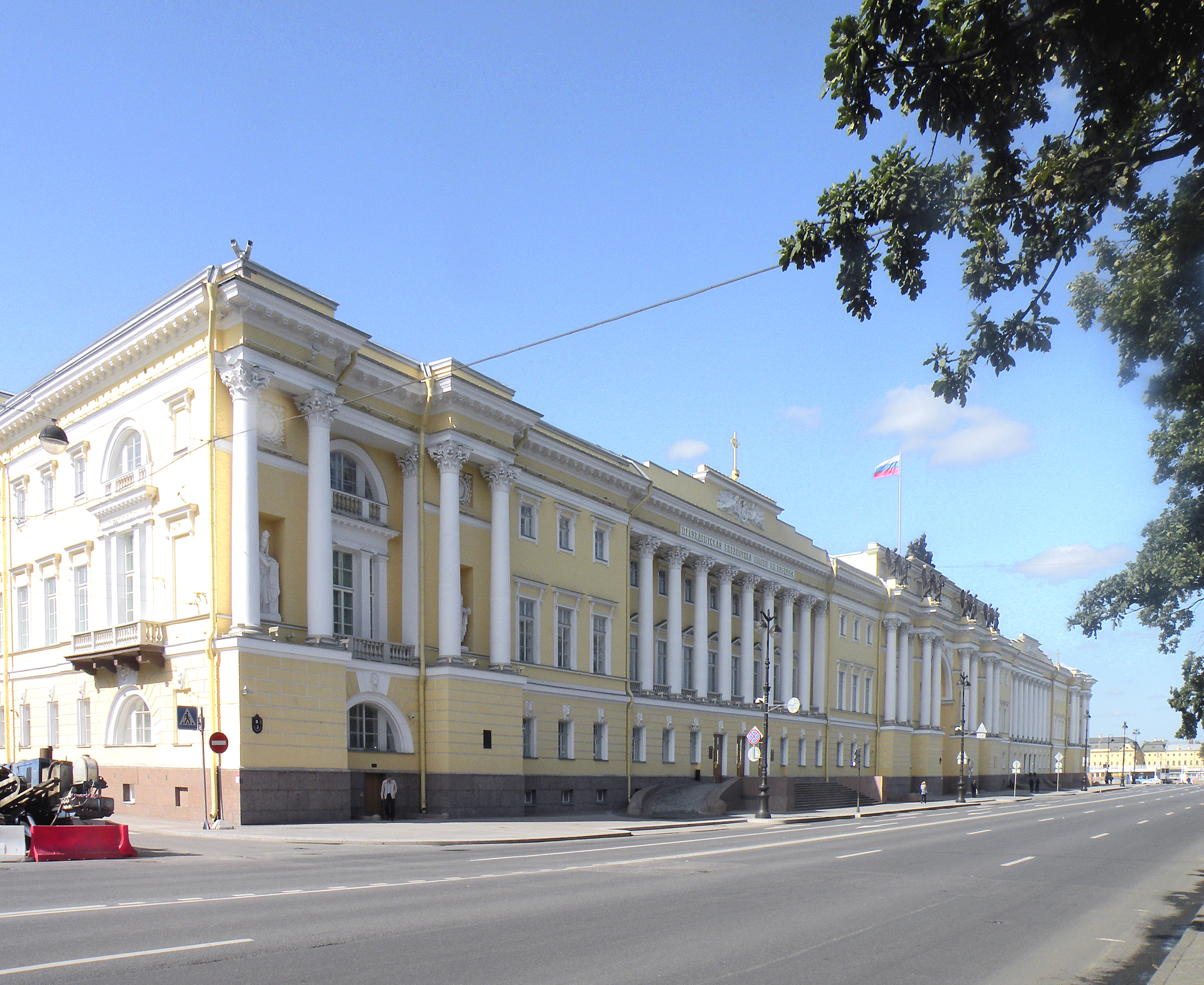
Senate and Synod Building on Senate Square, Saint Petersburg

The Most Holy Synod or Most Holy Governing Synod (Russian: Святейший Правительствующий Синод) was a congregation of Orthodox church leaders in Russia. It was established by Peter the Great, Stefan Yavorsky and Feofan Prokopovich in January 1721 to replace the Patriarchate of Moscow. It was abolished following the February Revolution of 1917 and replaced with a restored patriarchate under Tikhon of Moscow. In modern Russia, the Holy Synod of the Russian Orthodox Church is the highest governing body of the Russian Orthodox Church between Sobors. It is headed by the Patriarch of Moscow and all the Rus'.

=== The Greek Holy Synod ===
The first other Orthodox Church to imitate the Russian Government by synod was that of Greece. The national assemblies of free Greece in 1822 and 1827 began the process of making their Church independent of the Ecumenical Patriarch of Constantinople. In 1833 the Greek Parliament formally rejected the patriarch's authority and set up a Holy Directing Synod in exact imitation of Russia. After much dispute, the patriarch gave in and acknowledged the Greek synod, in 1850. Since then, the Church of Greece has been governed by a Holy Synod exactly as was the Church of Russia.

A law in 1852 regulated its rights and duties. It met at Athens under the presidency of the Metropolitan of Athens. Four other bishops were appointed by the Government as members for a year by vote. The members took an oath of fidelity to the king and government. Their deliberations were controlled by a royal commissioner, who was a layman chosen by government, just as the Russian oberprocuror. No act was valid without the commissioner's assent. There were also secretaries, writers, and a servant all appointed by the State. The Holy Synod was the highest authority in the Greek Church and had the same rights and duties as its Russian model, and was named in the liturgy instead of a patriarch.

After the proclamation of the Greek Republic in 1924, royal control of the Holy Synod naturally ceased, and with the elevation of the Metropolitan of Athens to an Archbishophric in 1932, the Archbishop began to be named in liturgies. Today, supreme authority is vested in the synod of all the diocesan bishops, who all have metropolitical status (the Hierarchy of the Church of Greece) under the presidency of the Archbishop of Athens and all Greece. This synod deals with general church questions. The Standing Synod is under the same presidency, and consists of the Primate and 12 bishops, each serving for one term on a rotating basis and deals with details of administration.

=== Holy Synod of the Romanian Orthodox Church ===
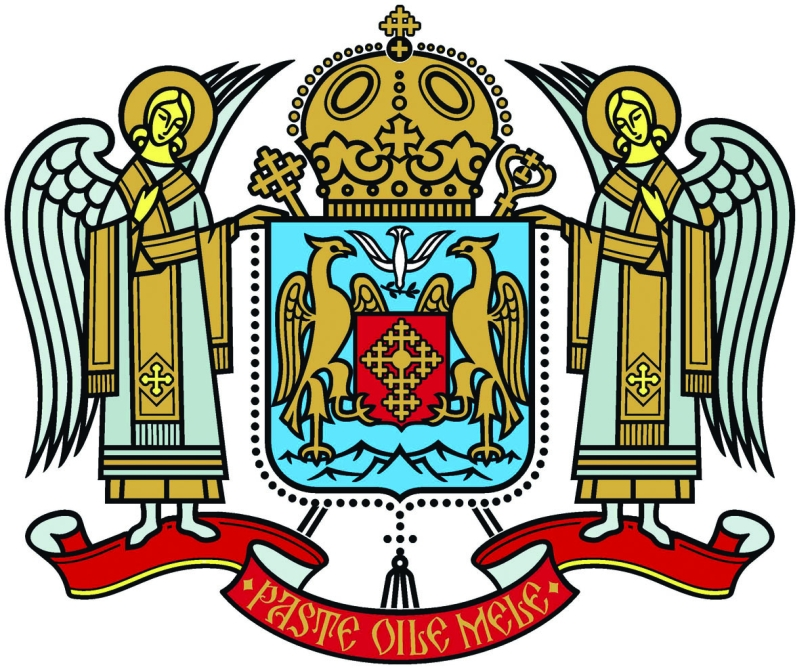
Coat of arms of the Romanian Orthodox Church

The Holy Synod of the Romanian Orthodox Church is organized as the highest authority on all matters concerning the church. It comprises the Patriarch, all metropolitans, archbishops, bishops and vicar bishops of the church. The Holy Synod usually meets two times a year, in spring and autumn in ordinary sessions but extraordinary sessions are organized whenever necessary. Whilst is the supreme authority on all matters of the church, it is a deliberative authority, as all of its members are the leaders of the entire church, directly representing all of the believers of the RoOC.

=== Holy Synod of the Serbian Orthodox Church ===
The Serbian Orthodox Church is governed by a five-member Holy Synod. The patriarch is a permanent member, while the other four are bishops elected for two-year terms by the Council of Bishops, a body that represents all the metropolitan bishops and other bishops of the church.

=== Holy Synod of the Bulgarian Orthodox Church ===
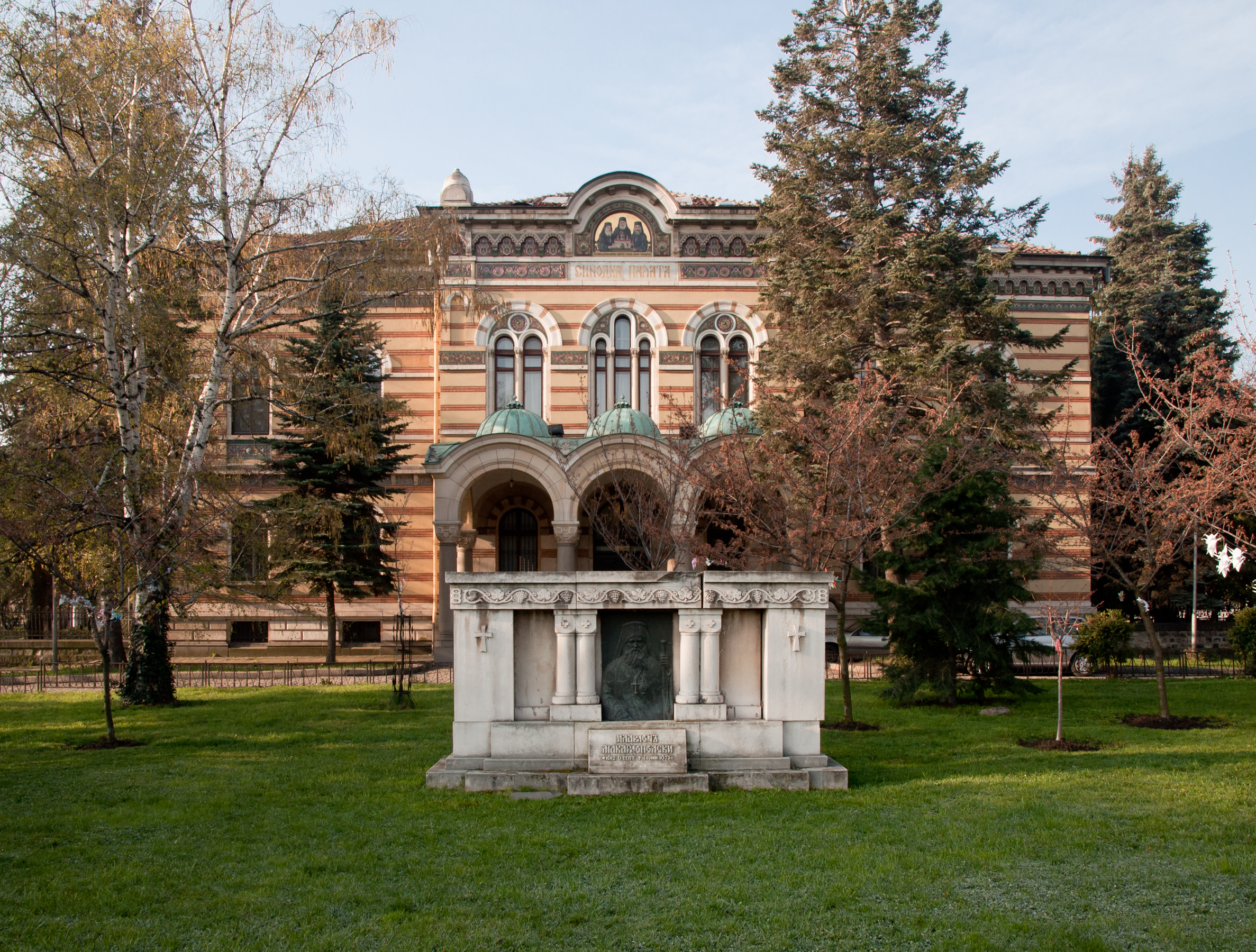
Synodal Palace, Sofia

The supreme clerical, judicial and administrative power for the whole domain of the Bulgarian Orthodox Church is exercised by the Holy Synod, which includes the Patriarch and the diocesan prelates, who are called metropolitans.

=== Holy Synod of the Orthodox Church in America ===
The supreme canonical authority of the Orthodox Church in America is delegated to the bishops of the Holy Synod. The Metropolitan is ex officio the Chairman of the Synod, but in his absence a chairman may be elected by the synodal bishops.

== Oriental Orthodoxy ==
=== The Coptic Holy Synod ===
The Holy Synod of the Coptic Orthodox Church of Alexandria is the highest authority in the Church of Alexandria and it formulates the rules and regulations regarding matters of church's organization, faith, service's order.

The Synod is chaired by the Pope of Alexandria and the members are the Church's Metropolitans, Bishops, Chorbishops and the Patriarchal Vicar for Alexandria.

=== The Syriac Holy Synod ===
The Holy Synod of the Syriac Orthodox Church of Antioch is the highest authority of the Church of Antioch. It is chaired by the Patriarch of Antioch with metropolitans and bishops as members.

== Catholic Church ==
Within the Catholic Church, each sui iuris patriarchal church and each major archiepiscopal church has its own synod of bishops, which is exclusively competent to make laws for the entire sui iuris church in question and is its tribunal.

The Code of Canons of the Eastern Churches makes mention 115 times of the synod of bishops in this sense. It does not add honorific adjectives such as "holy", "holy and sacred" "most holy", as used in some Eastern Orthodox and Oriental Orthodox churches.

The Code of Canons of the Eastern Churches distinguishes between a patriarchal or major archiepiscopal church's standing synod and the synod of its bishops as a whole. It is the standing synod that corresponds to the term "holy synod" as used above. The standing synod consists of the patriarch or major archbishop and four bishops appointed for a five-year term. Of these four, three are elected by the church's synod of bishops and one is appointed by the patriarch or major archbishop, while another four are designated in the same way to replace any member who is impeded. A meeting of the synod of all the church's bishops is called when a decision is required on a question that only it is authorized to decide, or when the patriarch or major archbishop, with the agreement of the standing synod, judges it to be necessary, or when at least one third of the bishops request that it be held to consider some specific matter. In addition, the individual canon law of some of these churches requires that their synod of bishops be convoked at predetermined intervals.

In metropolitan sui iuris churches a role analogous to that of the synod of bishops is played by a council of hierarchs.

== See also ==
- Caesaropapism
- Holy Synod of Jerusalem
- Holy Synod of Milan
- College of Cardinals - A similar body with similar functions in the Latin Church, which elects the Pope.
