= The Rock of Faith =

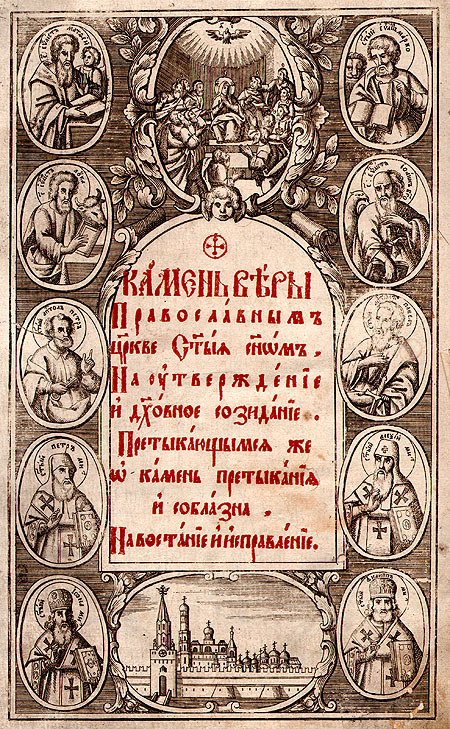
The Rock of Faith, 1749 printing

The Rock of Faith (Russian: Камень веры) also translated as The Stone of Faith, is a major anti-Protestant treatise written by Russian Orthodox Archbishop Stefan Yavorsky in 1713–1715. Its full title The Stone of faith: for the sons of the holy Orthodox Church — for affirmation and spiritual creation; for those who stumble over a block of stumbling and temptation — for getting up and correcting, Church Slavonic: Камєнь вѣры: православнымъ цєрквы святыѧ сыномъ на утвєрждєнїє и духовноє созиданїє. Прєтыкающымсѧ жє ω камєнь прєтыканїѧ и соблазна. На востанїє и исправленїє. Later it was also published under the title, The Stone of Faith of the Orthodox Catholic Eastern Church Russian: Камень веры православно-кафолическия восточныя Церкви...

Tsar Peter the Great (r. 1682–1725) forbade its publication, as during this time period Russia needed to attract Western Europeans, including a significant number of Protestants, and such work would be detrimental to this. It was later published in 1728 under Peter II.

An anonymous pamphlet that has eventually become known in historical works under the title, "Hammer on the Rock of Faith" (Russian: Молоток на „Камень веры“, romanized: Molotok na „Kamen very“), a rebuttal of Yavorsky's treatise, appeared between 1732 and 1734.

== Summary ==
The Rock of Faith consists of twelve chapters that cover the following issues: icons; the cross; relics; Holy Communion; prayers to the saints; prayers for the departed; holy tradition; liturgy; fasting; good works; and punishment of heretics.
