= Endemic synod =

Former synod of Constantinople Patriarchate

In the Eastern Orthodox Church, the endemic synod (Note: It may also be called the permanent synod, resident synod or endemousa synod.) or endemousa synodos (Greek: ἐνδημοῦσα σύνοδος) was the permanent standing synod of bishops of the Patriarchate of Constantinople that met frequently but irregularly to deal with issues of discipline and dogma. It was convoked and presided over by the patriarch.

The term endemousa synodos was first used to refer to the Council of Constantinople of 448, but the custom of convoking all bishops visiting or living (Note: endemountes in Greek) in or near Constantinople to a synod as needed was already common when it was formalized by the Council of Chalcedon on 451. By the 9th century, the variable structure of the endemic synod had begun to crystallize. Only metropolitan bishops, autocephalous archbishops and the administrative functionaries of the patriarch (of which there were five) were permitted to attend meetings. The synod gathered after the death of a patriarch and proposed three names to the emperor to fill the vacancy, although the emperor was not bound by these. It also proposed three names to the patriarch upon the vacancy of a metropolitanate.

The synod could on occasion be called by an emperor against a patriarch, as when Emperor Leo V deposed Patriarch Nikephoros I in 815. During the 11th-century Byzantine–Seljuq wars, a number of bishops fled to Constantinople and the size of the synod increased. In 1054, Patriarch Michael Keroularios convoked the synod at the height of the Great Schism. It was also convened to try John Italos for heresy in 1082. Under the Palaiologan emperors, the endemic synod continued to exist but there were frequent extraordinary synods, especially during the controversy over Palamism.

The endemousa synodos lasted through the end of the Byzantine Empire (1453) and continued under the Ottomans. In the 18th century, its remit was limited to strictly spiritual affairs and it was renamed the Holy Synod. It was also put on a more permanent footing.
