= Patriarch Adrian of Moscow =

Russian Orthodox bishop (c.1627–1700)

Adrian (Russian: Адриан)
- Patriarch of Moscow and all the Rus'
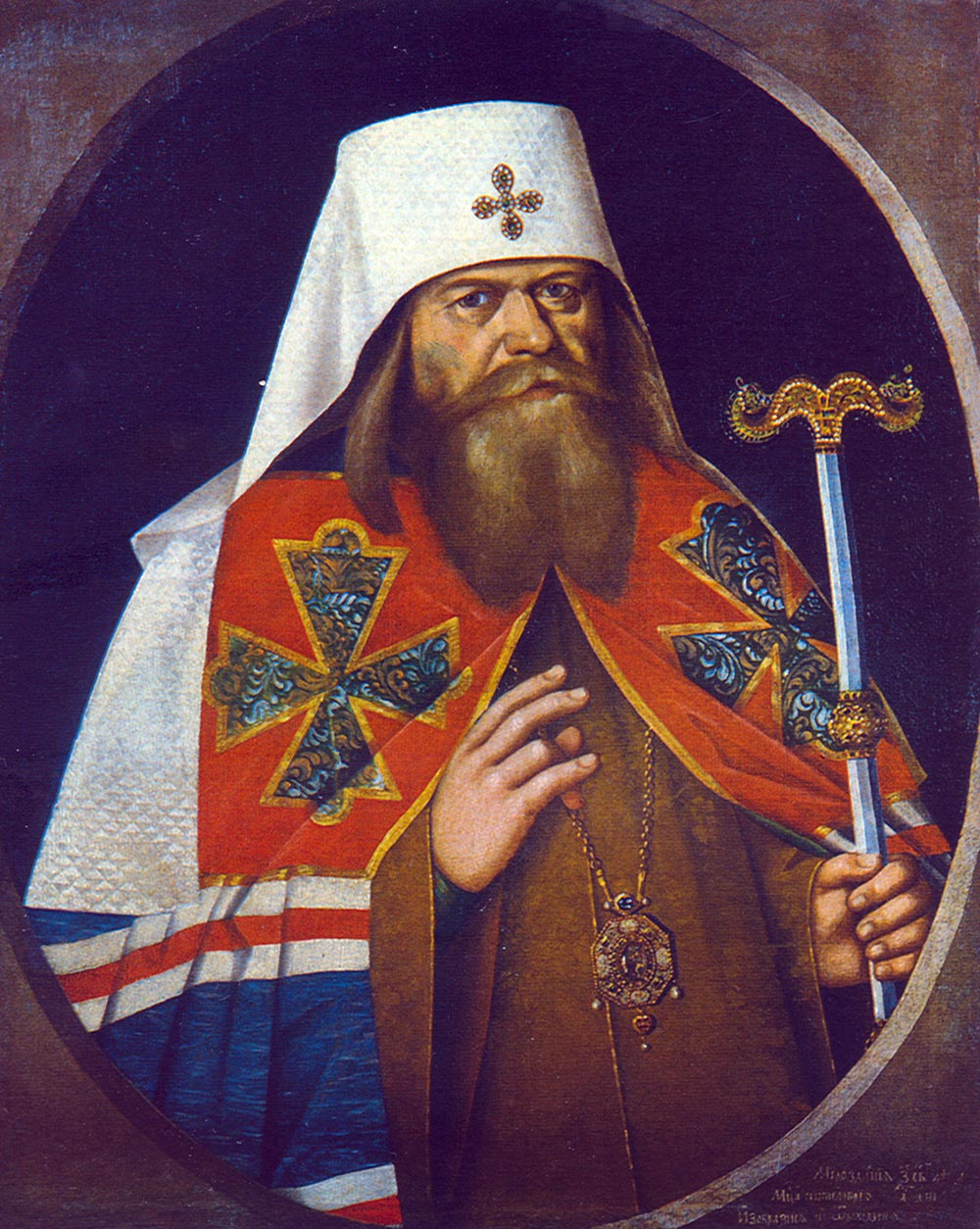
- Church: Russian Orthodox Church
- See: Moscow
- Predecessor: Joachim
- Successor: Stefan Yavorsky; Coadjutor

Personal details
- Born: 2 October 16[27] ? Moscow, Russia
- Died: 16 October 1700
- Buried: Dormition Cathedral, Moscow Kremlin
- Profession: Civil servant, Tsardom of Russia
- Education: NaUKMA

Patriarch Adrian (Russian: Адриан; born Andrey, Андрей; 2 October 1638 – 16 October 1700) was the last pre-revolutionary Patriarch of Moscow and All Russia.

According to historian Alexander Avdeyev, the future Patriarch Adrian was born in the last days of September 1638. The years 1627, 1637 and 1639 given in the literature are incorrect. October 2, named as his birthday, is most likely the day of his baptism. Adrian's life path before being appointed Archimandrite of the Chudov Monastery remains unknown.

Already being a monk, he was known for his piety and virtues to Patriarch Joachim, who in 1678 appointed him Archimandrite of the Chudov Monastery. Managing the monastery, Archimandrite Adrian helped the adjusting of this monastery a lot. Under his supervision, a cathedral church was built in the name of St. Alexius with the Annunciation chapel, and a church in the name of St. Andrew the First-Called.

Adrian caught the eye of Patriarch Joachim, when he was still an archmandrite at Chudov Monastery. In 1686, Joachim appointed him metropolitan of Kazan and Sviyazhsk. On 24 August 1690, Adrian was chosen to replace Joachim on his post. Patriarch Adrian was a staunch adherent of traditional norms and opposed Peter the Great's reforms (e.g., he criticized Peter's decree on mandatory shaving of beards). Adrian's relations with the tsar were tense; however, he had to accept some of Peter's criticism about deficiencies in management of the Russian Orthodox Church.

Adrian sought to eradicate Latinizations in the Church in Ukraine. He introduced a confession requiring bishops-elect to state that the epiclesis, rather than the Words of Institution, transforms the gifts at the liturgy into the body and blood of Christ.

== Literature ==
- Скворцов, Григорий (1913). Патриарх Адриан, его жизнь и труды в связи с состоянием русской церкви в последнее десятилетие XVII века (in Russian). Казань: Центральная типография.
- Устинова, Ирина; Морохин, Алексей (2021). "Смерть патриарха Иоакима и выборы главы русской православной церкви в 1690 г.". Российская история (in Russian) (5): 61–70. doi:10.31857/S086956870016614-6.

Eastern Orthodox Church titles
Preceded by Joachim	Patriarch of Moscow; 1690–1700	Succeeded by Tikhon
