= Theophan Prokopovich =

Religious leader and scholar (1681–1736)

- De-facto head of the Most Holy Synod
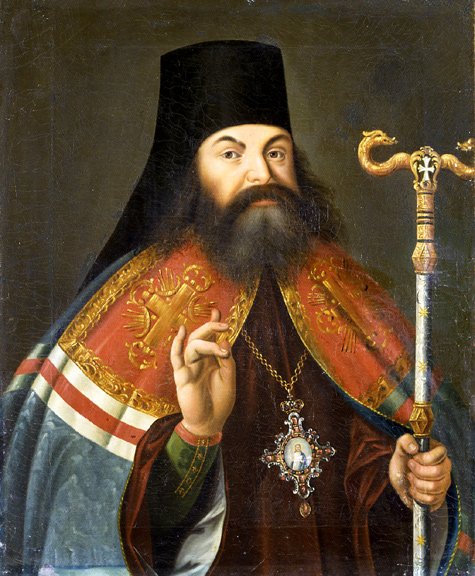
- Posthumous portrait, mid-18th century
- Church: Russian Orthodox Church
- See: Novgorod
- Installed: 1722
- Term ended: 1736
- Predecessor: Stefan Yavorsky
- Successor: Joseph Volchansky

Personal details
- Born: 18 June 1681 Kiev, Cossack Hetmanate, Tsardom of Russia
- Died: 19 September 1736 (aged 55) St. Petersburg, Russian Empire
- Education: Kiev Academy

Theophan or Feofan Prokopovich (Russian: Феофан Прокопович; Ukrainian: Феофан Прокопович, romanized: Feofan Prokopovych; 18 June [O.S. 8 June] 1681 – 19 September [O.S. 8 September] 1736) was a Russian Orthodox bishop, theologian, pietist, writer, poet, mathematician, astronomer, pedagogue and philosopher of Ukrainian origin. He was the rector of the Academia Mohileana in Kiev (1711–1716), the bishop of Pskov (1718–1725), and the archbishop of Novgorod (1725–1736).

Prokopovich elaborated upon and implemented Peter the Great's reform of the Russian Orthodox Church; he served as the first vice-president of the Most Holy Synod from 1721, which replaced the office of the patriarch. He was the de facto leader of the synod (and the Russian Orthodox Church) following the death of Stefan Yavorsky in 1722. Prokopovich also wrote many religious verses and some of the most enduring sermons in the Russian language.

== Biography ==
=== Childhood and education ===
Theophan (born Eleazar or Elisei) Prokopovich was born in Kiev, Cossack Hetmanate, a vassal state under the Tsardom of Russia. His father, Tsereysky, was a shopkeeper from Smolensk. After the death of his parents, Eleazar was adopted by his maternal uncle, Feofan Prokopovich. Feofan Prokopovich was the abbot of the Kiev Brotherhood Epiphany Monastery, professor, and rector of the Academia Mohileana.

Prokopovich's uncle sent him to the monastery for primary school. After graduation, he became a student of the Academia Mohileana.

In 1698, after graduating from the Academia Mohileana, Eleazar continued his education at the Volodymyr Uniate Collegium. He lived in the Basilian monastery and was tonsured as a Uniate monk under the name of Elisha or Elisey. The Uniate Bishop of Volodymyr, Zalensky, noticed the extraordinary abilities of the young monk and contributed to his transfer to the Catholic Academy of St. Athanasius in Rome, which was created by theologians to spread Catholicism among Eastern Orthodox adherents.

In Rome, he enjoyed access to the Vatican Library. In addition to theology, Prokopovich also studied the works of ancient Latin and Greek philosophers, historians, attractions of old and new Rome, and the principles of the Catholic faith and of the Pope. Throughout his studies, he became acquainted with the works of Tommaso Campanella, Galileo Galilei, Giordano Bruno, and Nicolaus Copernicus.

On 28 October 1701, Prokopovich left Rome without completing his full course at the academy. He passed through France, Switzerland, and Germany, before studying in Halle. There he became acquainted with the ideas of the Protestant Reformation.

=== Return to Russia ===
He returned to Ukraine (then part of the Tsardom of Russia) in 1704, first to Pochayiv Lavra, then to Kiev, where he renounced the Catholic union, did penance and was tonsured with the Orthodox monks, taking the name Feofan in memory of his uncle.

Beginning in 1705, Prokopovich taught rhetoric, poetics, and philosophy at the Kiev-Mogila Collegium. He also wrote the tragicomedy Vladimir, dedicating it to Hetman Ivan Mazepa. At the same time, he wrote the theological and philosophical sermons which were seen by the governor-generals of Kiev Dmitry Golitsyn and Alexander Menshikov.

In 1707, he became the prefect of the Kiev Academy. In 1711, Prokopovich gave a sermon on the occasion of the anniversary of the Battle of Poltava. The tsar of Russia, Peter I, was struck by the eloquence of this sermon, and upon his return to Kiev, Feofan Prokopovich was appointed as the rector of the Kiev-Mogila Academy and a professor of theology. At the same time, he also became abbot of the Kiev Brotherhood Epiphany Monastery. He entirely reformed the teaching of theology there, substituting the historical method of the German theologians for the Orthodox scholastic system.

In 1716, he went to Saint Petersburg. From that point, Prokopovich spent his time explaining the new scholastic system and justifying its most controversial innovations from the pulpit. Despite the opposition of the Russian clergy, who regarded the "Light of Kiev" as an interloper and semi-heretic, he became invaluable to the civil power. He was promoted to bishop of Pskov in 1718, and archbishop of Novgorod in 1725. He died in Saint Petersburg. (Note: He had served as vicar to the previous Archbishop of Novgorod since the early 18th century. See Pavel Tikhomirov, Kafedra Novgorodskikh Sviatitelei (Novgorod, 1895–1899).)

As the author of the spiritual regulation for the reform of the Russian Orthodox Church, Feofan is regarded as the creator of the spiritual department superseding the patriarchate, better known by its later name of the Holy Governing Synod, of which he was made vice-president. A pitiless enemy of superstitions of any kind, Prokopovich continued to be a reformer even after the death of Peter the Great. He simplified Russian preaching, introducing popular themes and a simple style into Orthodox pulpits.
