= Stefan Yavorsky =

Eastern Orthodox archbishop

- Metropolitan and archbishop of Moscow.
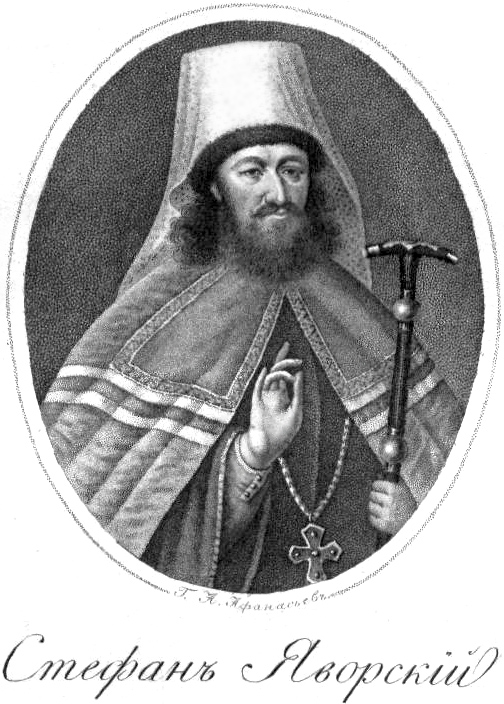
- Church: Russian Orthodox Church
- See: Moscow
- Installed: 1721
- Term ended: 1722
- Predecessor: Patriarch Adrian of Moscow
- Successor: Theophan Prokopovich

Personal details
- Born: 1658
- Died: 8 December 1722 (aged 63–64)
- Education: Kyiv Mohyla Academy

Stefan Yavorsky (Russian: Стефа́н Яво́рский, Ukrainian: Стефа́н Яво́рський), born Simeon Ivanovich Yavorsky (Russian: Симеон Иванович Яворский) (1658 – 8 December [O.S. 27 November] 1722 (Note: Most sources (including the Great Soviet Encyclopedia) give a death date of 8 December [O.S. 27 November], but the older Brockhaus and Efron has 5 December [O.S. 24 November])), was an archbishop and statesman in the Russian Empire and the first president of the Most Holy Synod.

== Biography ==
Yavorsky was born in Jaworów, Ruthenian Voivodeship of Poland (now in Ukraine). He enrolled in the Kyiv-Mohyla Academy around 1673 and completed its course of study; in 1684 he traveled back to Poland to continue his education, at which point he was compelled to join the Uniate church, as was common for Kievan students who wanted to study in the Polish–Lithuanian Commonwealth; he took the Uniate name Stanislav (Russian: Станислав). He spent five years abroad, studying philosophy in Lwów and Lublin and theology in Poznań and Vilnius, where he completed his education. In 1689 he returned to Kiev, broke from the Uniate church and returned to Eastern Orthodoxy. He took monastic vows under the name Stefan and settled at the Kiev Academy as a preacher and professor, being appointed prefect of the institution and in 1697 hegumen of the Nikolaevsky monastery (Russian: Пустынно-Николаевский монастырь). He also began to preach, which soon made him well known in Kiev. At the beginning of 1700 he visited Moscow on church business, and when the boyar Aleksei Shein died in February Patriarch Adrian commissioned him to give the eulogy, which attracted the attention of Peter I, who was so pleased he had Yavorsky remain in Moscow and ordered a position to be found for him, as a result of which he was made archbishop of Ryazan and Murom in April. When Adrian himself died in October, Yavorsky was appointed locum tenens of the patriarchal see. "Thus in the course of seven months Iavorsky ascended from the humble position of father superior to the highest office in the entire church. Iavorsky had never desired such an appointment and even attempted to avoid it, but Peter was unyielding [because] the prelate was not a progressive or a reformer, but he was an authoritative figure with a European education, of which there were still few in Russia".

Yavorsky's life now changed dramatically. He lived in Moscow, Saint Petersburg, and Ryazan, returning to Ukraine only rarely and with the express permission of the tsar. As the head of the church, he had to deal with the struggles between the various factions in the church, and he was expected to uphold Peter's reforms. At first he did so, but eventually the reforms restricted the rights of the church that he began to oppose them, and in 1712 a sermon of his, calling the Tsarevich Alexei "Russia's only hope" and hinting at criticism of the tsar's personal life, so angered Peter that he forbade Yavorsky to preach in public. Yavorsky directed a commission on correcting the translation of the Bible and wrote The Rock of Faith (Russian: Камень веры), a huge treatise on dogma that "was sharply anti-Protestant in spirit" and whose publication Peter forbade (it was published in 1728 under Peter II). In 1721 he was made first president of the newly erected Holy Synod, but the real power was held by its vice president, Peter's close collaborator Theophan Prokopovich. When Yavorsky died in the following year, Prokopovich took his place as president; shortly before his death, suspected of being involved in a publication that accused Peter of being the Antichrist, he was interrogated in his home by members of the Synod and Senate, and "it is possible that only his death saved Iavorsky from punishment".

== Literary activity ==
Yavorsky was one of the most educated figures in the Russian church of his day, and throughout his life "he aspired to a quiet life of independent literary activity rather than a great career". Around 1685 he published his panegyric Hercules post Atlantem, dedicated to Varlaam Yasinsky, archimandrite of the Kiev Pechersk Lavra; it was "a complex rhetorical construction of Latin prose with poems in Latin and Polish". In 1690 he published two more panegyrics to Yasinsky, Arctos coeli (Constellation of the heavens) and Pełnia nieubywającej chwały (Abundance of unlessening glory), confirming his reputation as a poet. After he became hegumen of the Nikolaevsky monastery, his sermon Vinograd Khristov (The vineyard of Christ) was published in 1698. Soon after he became head of the Russian church, he presided over the trial of Grigory Talitsky, who had proclaimed Peter the Antichrist, and his refutation of Talitsky, Znameniya prishestviya Antikhristova i konchiny veka (Signs of the arrival of the Antichrist and the end of the age), was published in 1703 and reprinted many times during the eighteenth century.

== See also ==
- List of metropolitans and patriarchs of Moscow

== Sources ==
- Nikolaev, Sergei (1995), "Stefan Iavorsky", in Levitt, Marcus C. (ed.), Early Modern Russian Writers: Late Seventeenth and Eighteenth Centuries, Gale Research, pp. 116–119, ISBN 0810357119
