= Russo-Ukrainian war =

Ongoing conflict since 2014

- Part of Post-Soviet conflicts
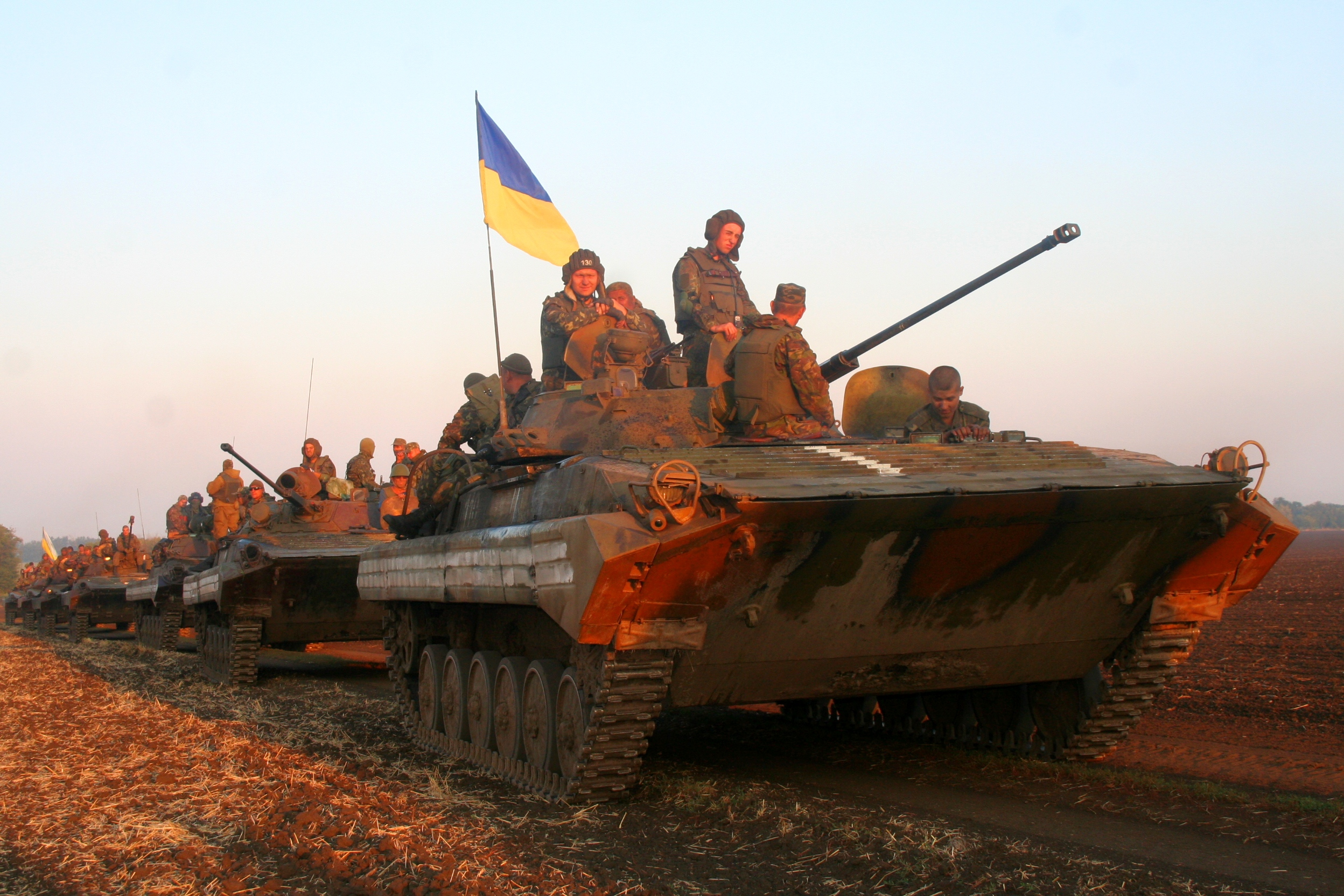
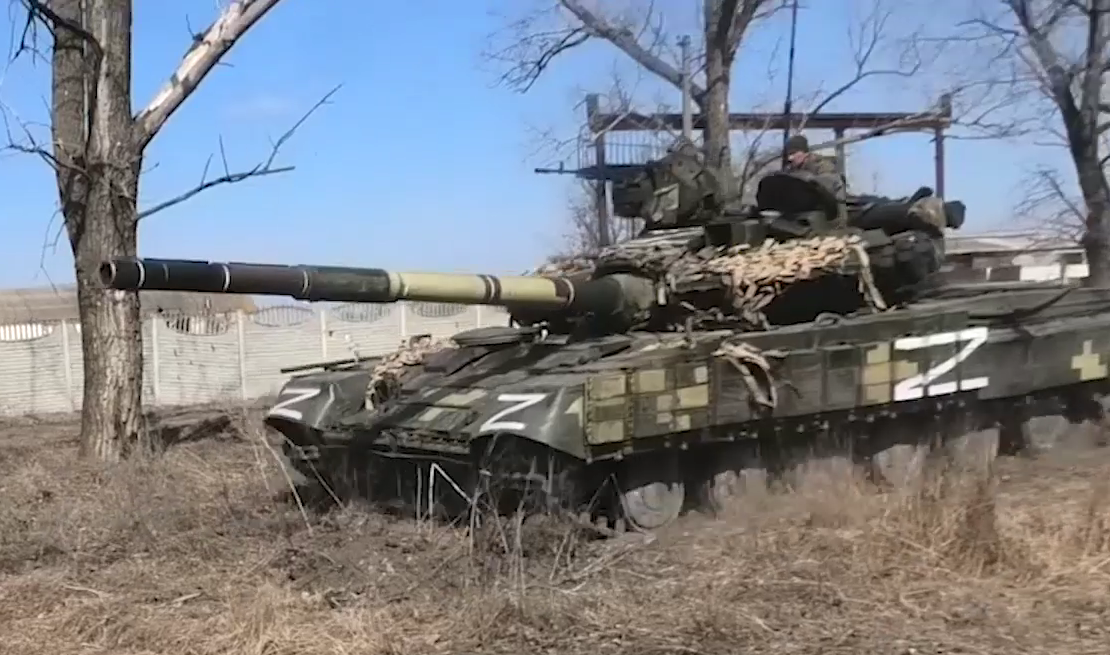
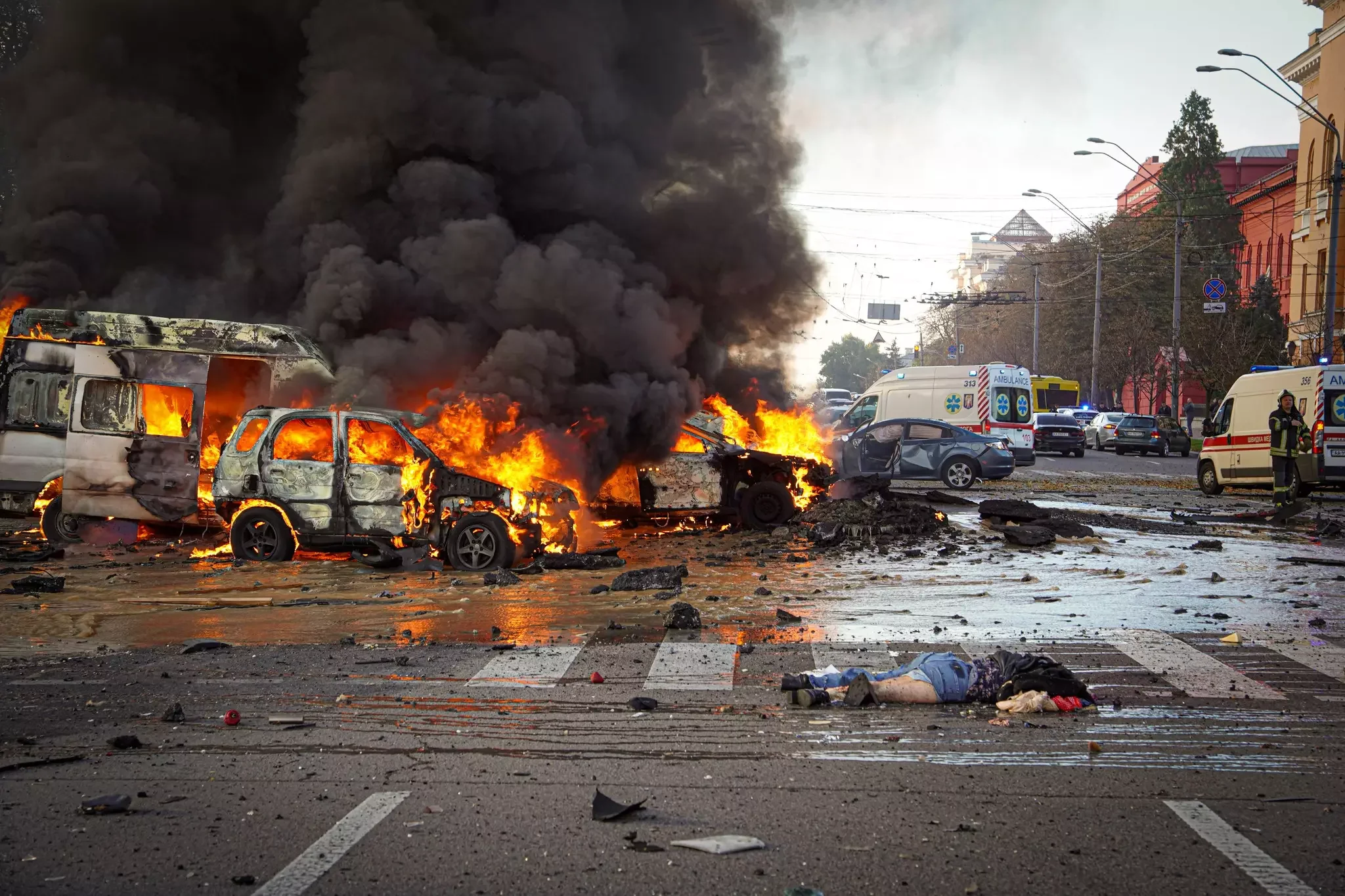
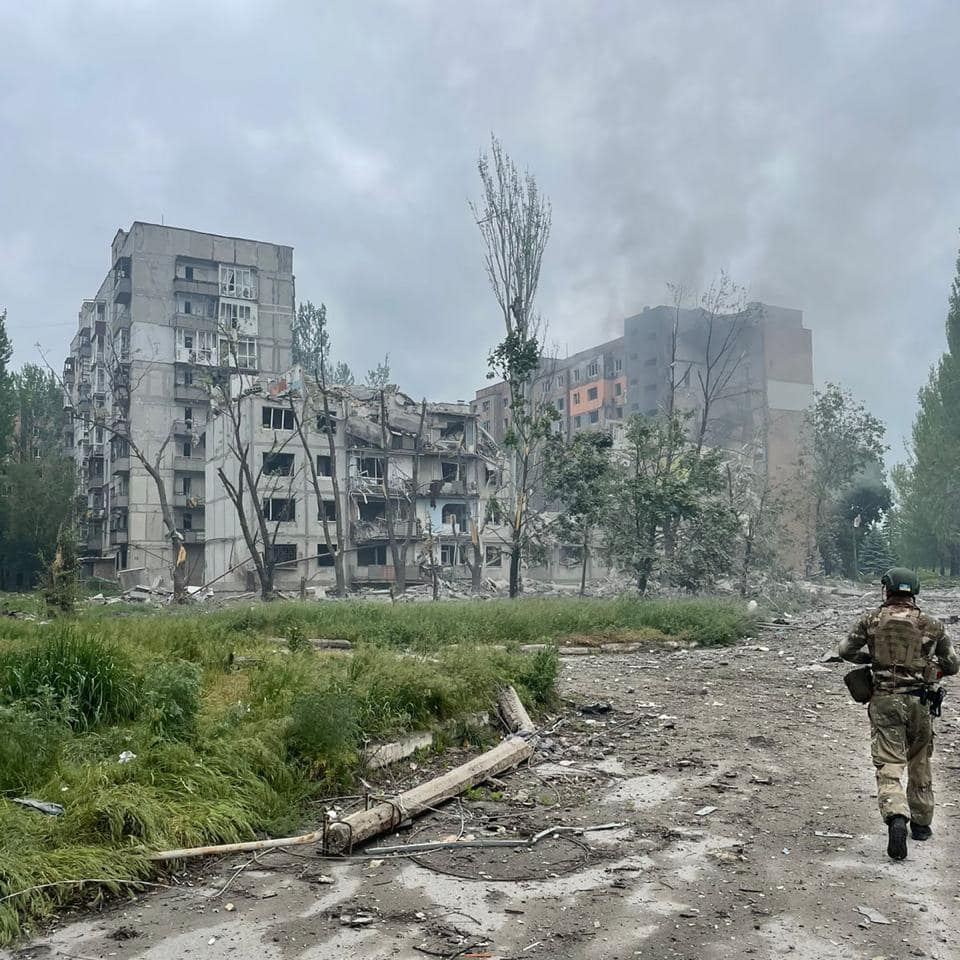
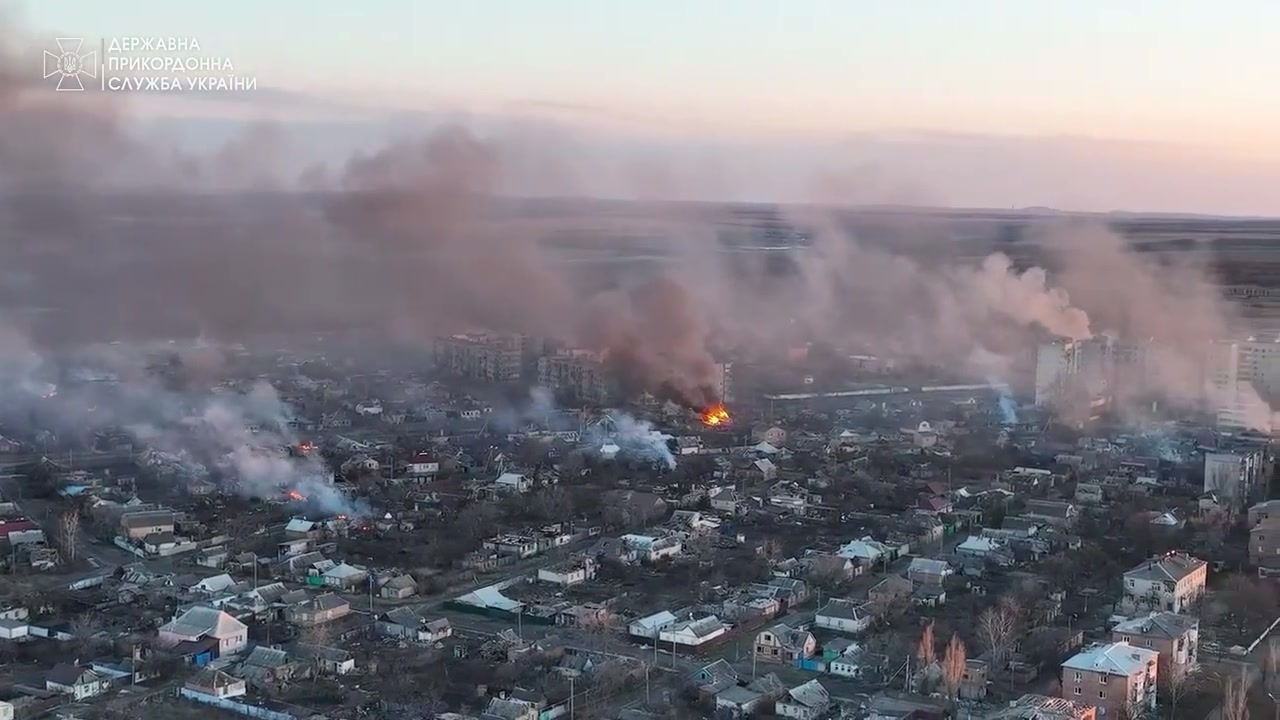
- Top to bottom, left to right: Ukrainian troops during the war in Donbas, 2014; Russian T-64 tank with Z markings, 2022; Civilian killed after Russian strikes on Kyiv, 2022; Residential building damaged by a Russian missile in Avdiivka, 2023; Burning buildings during the Siege of Mariupol, 2022; Aerial view of the Battle of Bakhmut, 2023
Date	Late February 2014 (Note: There are "some contradictions and inherent problems" regarding the date on which the occupation began. The Ukrainian Government maintains, and the European Court of Human Rights agrees, that Russia controlled Crimea from 27 February 2014, when unmarked Russian commandos seized its political institutions. The Russian Government later made 27 February "Special Operations Forces Day". In 2015, the Ukrainian parliament officially designated 20 February 2014 as "the beginning of the temporary occupation of Crimea and Sevastopol by Russia", citing the date inscribed on the Russian medal "For the Return of Crimea". On that date, Vladimir Konstantinov, then Chairman of the Supreme Council of Crimea, had said the region would be prepared to join Russia. In 2018, Russian Foreign Minister Sergey Lavrov claimed that the earlier "start date" on the medal was due to a "technical misunderstanding". President Putin stated in a Russian film about the annexation that he ordered the operation to "restore" Crimea to Russia following an all-night emergency meeting on 22–23 February 2014.) – present (12 years, 8 months, 3 weeks and 2 days)
Location	Ukraine, Russia, and the Black Sea (Note: With spillover into Romania, Poland, Finland, Estonia, Latvia, Moldova, Belarus and Sudan.)
Status	Ongoing
Territorial changes	Russian annexation of Crimea and parts of four southeast Ukrainian oblasts in 2014 and 2022, respectively; Russian occupation of roughly 20% of Ukrainian territory; Ukrainian occupation of parts of Russia's Kursk Oblast since 2024

Belligerents
Russia; Donetsk PR (Note: The Donetsk People's Republic and the Luhansk People's Republic were Russian puppet states that declared their independence from Ukraine in May 2014. In 2022, they received international recognition from each other, Russia, Syria and North Korea, and some other partially recognised states. On 30 September 2022, Russia declared that it had formally annexed both entities.); Luhansk PR; North Korea; Belarus (Note: In 2022, Belarus allowed Russia to use its territory to launch the invasion and to launch missiles into Ukraine.); Supplied by: For details, see Russian military suppliers	Ukraine; Supplied by: For details, see military aid to Ukraine

Commanders and leaders
(Russia) Vladimir Putin; (Russia) Sergei Shoigu; (Russia) Andrey Belousov; (Russia) Valery Gerasimov; (Russia) Yevgeny Prigozhin X; Denis Pushilin; Dmitry Trapeznikov; Alexander Zakharchenko X; Leonid Pasechnik; Igor Plotnitsky; Valery Bolotov	(Ukraine) Volodymyr Zelenskyy; (Ukraine) Petro Poroshenko; (Ukraine) Oleksandr Turchynov; (Ukraine) Andrii Zahorodniuk; (Ukraine) Stepan Poltorak; (Ukraine) Ruslan Khomchak; (Ukraine) Valeriy Heletey; (Ukraine) Ihor Tenyukh; (Ukraine) Valerii Zaluzhnyi; (Ukraine) Oleksandr Syrskyi; (Ukraine) Mykhailo Drapatyi

Strength
- For details of strengths and units involved at key points in the conflict, see: Combatants of the war in Donbas (2014–2022) Russo-Ukrainian war order of battle

Casualties and losses
- Hundreds of thousands, reports vary widely. See Casualties of the Russo-Ukrainian war for details.

The Russo-Ukrainian war began in February 2014 and is ongoing. Following Ukraine's Revolution of Dignity, Russia occupied Crimea and annexed it from Ukraine. It then supported Russian separatist armed groups who started a war in the eastern Donbas region against Ukraine's military. In 2018, Ukraine declared the region to be occupied by Russia. The first eight years of conflict also involved naval incidents and cyberwarfare. In February 2022, Russia launched a full-scale invasion of Ukraine and began occupying more of the country, starting the current phase of the war, the largest conflict in Europe since World War II. The war has resulted in a refugee crisis and hundreds of thousands of deaths.

In early 2014, the Euromaidan protests led to the Revolution of Dignity and the flight of Ukraine's pro-Russian president Viktor Yanukovych. Immediately after, unmarked Russian troops occupied Crimea. In March 2014, Russia annexed Crimea after an illegitimate referendum. Meanwhile, pro-Russian protests began in parts of southeastern Ukraine. In April 2014, Russian-backed militants seized towns and cities in Ukraine's eastern Donbas region and proclaimed the Donetsk People's Republic (DPR) and the Luhansk People's Republic (LPR) as independent states, starting the Donbas war. Russia covertly supported the separatists with its own troops, tanks, and artillery, preventing Ukraine from fully retaking the territory. The International Criminal Court (ICC) judged that the war was both a national and international armed conflict involving Russia, and the European Court of Human Rights judged that Russia controlled the DPR and LPR from 2014 onward. In February 2015, Russia and Ukraine signed the Minsk II agreements, but they were never fully implemented in the following years. The Donbas war became a static conflict likened to trench warfare; ceasefires were repeatedly broken, but the frontlines did not move.

Beginning in 2021, there was a massive Russian military buildup near Ukraine's borders, including within neighbouring Belarus. Russian officials repeatedly denied plans to attack Ukraine. Russia's president Vladimir Putin voiced expansionist views and challenged Ukraine's right to exist. He demanded that Ukraine be barred from ever joining the NATO military alliance. Ukraine had been officially a neutral country when the conflict began, but because of Russia's attacks, it revived plans to join NATO. In early 2022, Russia recognised the DPR and LPR as independent states. While Russian troops surrounded Ukraine, its proxies stepped up attacks on Ukrainian forces in the Donbas.

On 24 February 2022, Putin announced a "special military operation" to "demilitarize and denazify" Ukraine, claiming Russia had no plans to occupy the country. The Russian invasion that followed was internationally condemned; many countries imposed sanctions against Russia and sent humanitarian and military aid to Ukraine. In the face of fierce resistance, Russia abandoned an attempt to seize Kyiv in early April. In August, Ukrainian forces began liberating territories in the north-east and south. In September, Russia declared the annexation of four partially occupied provinces, which was internationally condemned. Since then, Russian offensives and Ukrainian counteroffensives have gained only small amounts of territory. The invasion has also led to attacks in Russia by Ukrainian and Ukrainian-backed forces, among them a cross-border offensive into Russia's Kursk region in August 2024. Russia has repeatedly carried out deliberate and indiscriminate attacks on civilians far from the frontline. The UN Human Rights Office reported that Russia was committing severe human rights violations in occupied Ukraine. The ICC opened an investigation into war crimes and issued arrest warrants for Putin and several other Russian officials. Russia has repeatedly refused calls for a ceasefire.

== Background ==
=== Independent Ukraine and the Orange Revolution ===
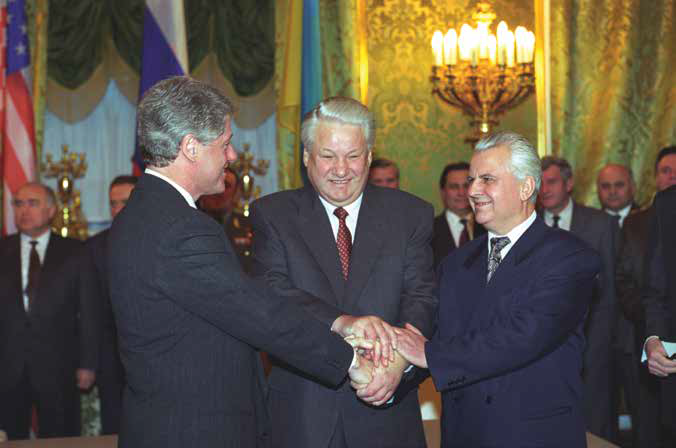
US president Clinton, Russian president Yeltsin, and Ukrainian president Kravchuk after signing the Trilateral Statement (1994). Russia and the US agreed to respect Ukraine's sovereignty in return for Ukraine giving up its nuclear weapons.

After the dissolution of the Soviet Union (USSR) in 1991, Ukraine and Russia maintained ties. In 1994, Ukraine signed the Treaty on the Non-Proliferation of Nuclear Weapons and agreed to give up the former Soviet nuclear weapons in Ukraine. In return, Russia, the United Kingdom, and the United States agreed to uphold the territorial integrity and independence of Ukraine through the Budapest Memorandum on Security Assurances. In 1997, Russia signed the NATO-Russia Founding Act, in which it acknowledged that "NATO has expanded and will continue to expand its political functions". In 1999, it was also one of the signatories of the Charter for European Security, affirming the right of each state "to choose or change its security arrangements" and to join military alliances if it wishes. Several former Eastern Bloc countries joined NATO, partly in response to regional security threats involving Russia. In 2005, Putin said that if Ukraine and other former Soviet states wanted to join NATO, "we will respect their choice, because it is their sovereign right to decide their own defense policy, and this will not worsen relations between our countries." Putin later said Western powers broke promises by expanding NATO eastward, even though no agreements or promises to this effect were made.

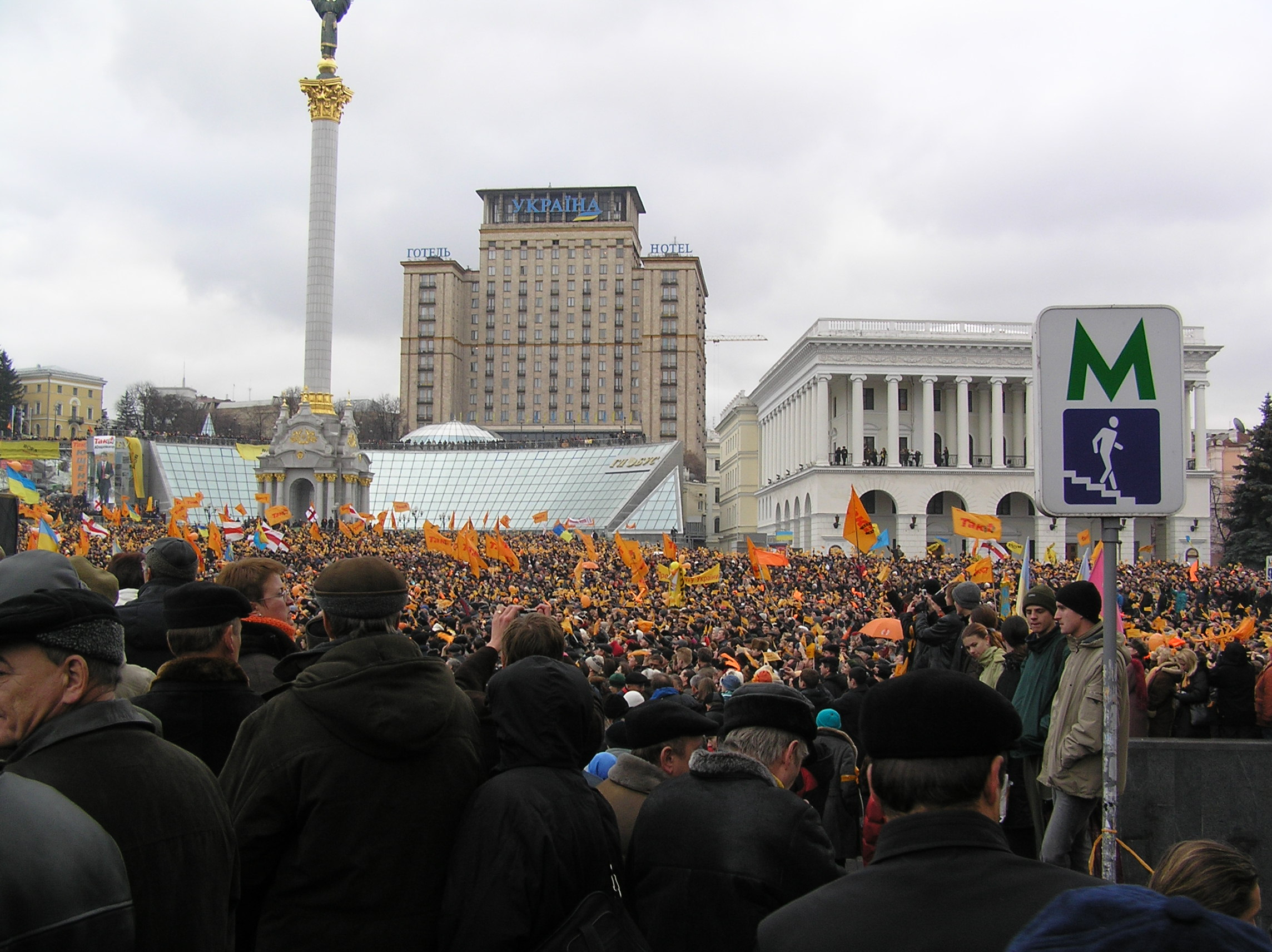
Protesters in Independence Square in Kyiv during the Orange Revolution, November 2004

The 2004 Ukrainian presidential election was controversial. During the election campaign, pro-Western opposition candidate Viktor Yushchenko was poisoned by TCDD dioxin; he later accused Russia of involvement. The more Russia-friendly candidate Viktor Yanukovych was declared the winner, despite allegations of vote-rigging by election observers. During a two-month period which became known as the Orange Revolution, large peaceful protests successfully challenged the outcome, and the Supreme Court of Ukraine annulled the result due to widespread electoral fraud. A re-run election was won by Yushchenko. The Russian government sees the Orange Revolution as one of the "colour revolutions" in former Soviet states. According to Anthony Cordesman, Russian military officers viewed such "colour revolutions" as attempts by the US and European countries to undermine Russia.

=== Russo-Georgian War ===
At the 2008 Bucharest summit, Ukraine and Georgia sought to join NATO, but NATO members were split. Western European countries opposed offering Membership Action Plans (MAP) to Ukraine and Georgia, fearing it would unsettle Russia. NATO refused to offer Ukraine and Georgia MAPs but also issued a statement agreeing that "these countries will become members of NATO" at some point. Putin strongly opposed their NATO membership bids.

Russia invaded Georgia in August 2008 and took control of the breakaway regions of Abkhazia and South Ossetia, demonstrating Russia's willingness to use military force to attain its political objectives. Political scientist Paul D'Anieri says the United States "was accused of appeasement and naivete" over its reaction to the invasion. The West's weak response in 2008—and later in 2014—contributed to Russia's assessment of Western warnings against the 2022 invasion as not serious, and, according to political scientist Samuel Ramani, encouraged further Russian aggression.

=== Euromaidan and Revolution of Dignity ===
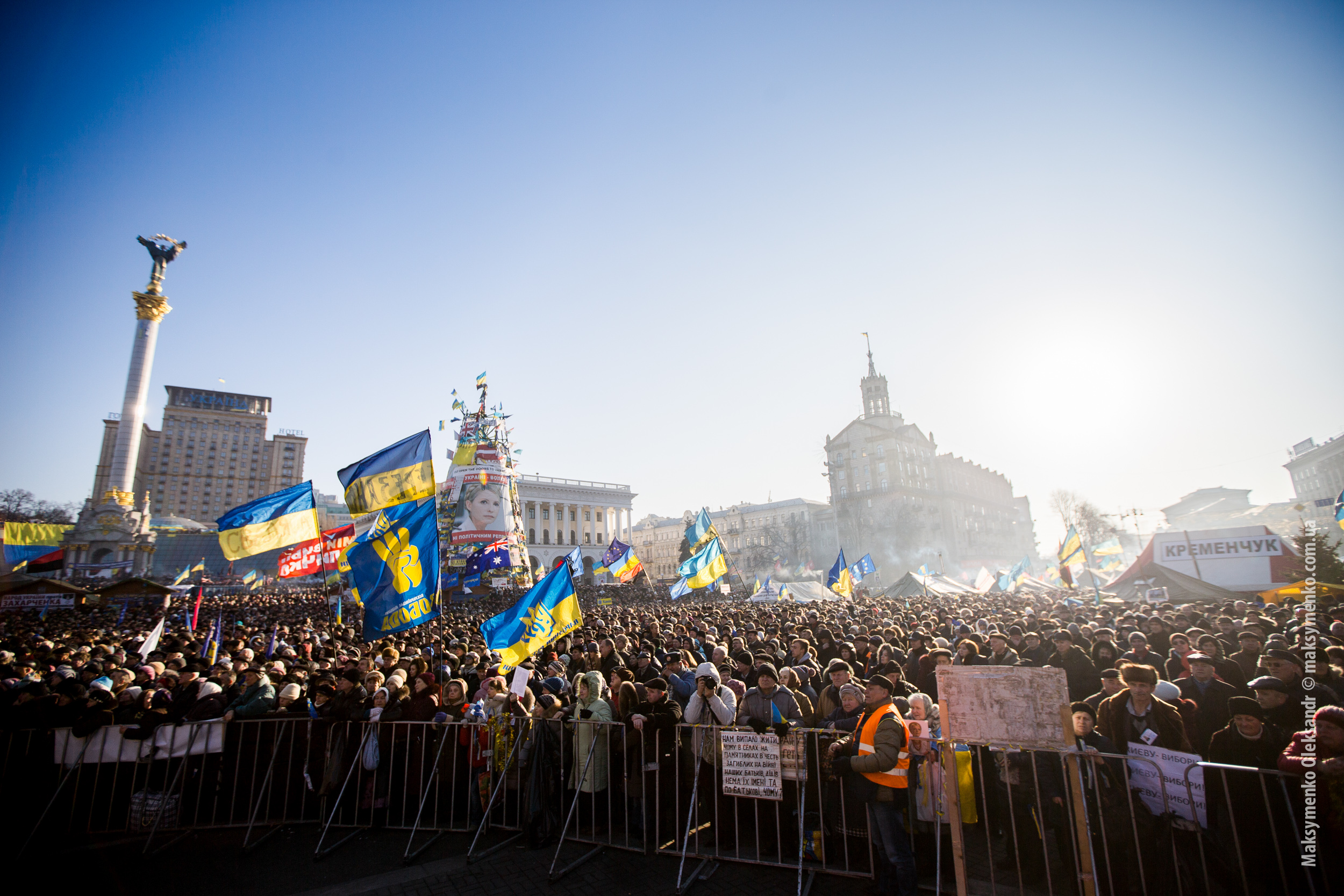
Protesters at a rally on Independence Square, Kyiv, 29 December 2013

Viktor Yanukovych won the 2010 Ukrainian presidential election. In early 2013, the Ukrainian parliament overwhelmingly approved of finalising a free trade and association agreement with the European Union (EU). The Kremlin pressured Ukraine to reject this agreement; Russia imposed embargoes on Ukrainian goods and threatened further sanctions. Kremlin adviser Sergey Glazyev warned that Russia might no longer acknowledge Ukraine's borders if the agreement was signed.

Under pressure from Russia, in November 2013, Ukrainian president Yanukovych suddenly withdrew from signing the agreement. This sparked a wave of massive protests, known as the "Euromaidan." The protesters opposed Russian interference, government corruption, abuse of power, and human rights violations, including new anti-protest laws.

The protests led to the Revolution of Dignity. On 28 January 2014, Ukraine's government resigned. On 18–20 February, more than 100 protesters were killed in clashes with Berkut special riot police; most were shot by the Berkut. On 21 February, President Yanukovych and the opposition leaders signed an agreement to bring about an interim unity government, urgent constitutional changes (which needed to be signed by the president), and early elections. However, Yanukovych secretly fled the capital that evening and did not inform parliament of his whereabouts. The next day, Ukraine's parliament unanimously voted to remove Yanukovych from office. About 73% of the parliament and members of all parties voted to remove him, including members of his own party and of the pro-Russian Communist Party.

On 27 February, an interim government was established, and early presidential elections were scheduled. The following day, Yanukovych resurfaced in Russia and declared that he remained the president of Ukraine. Some political leaders in the mainly Russian-speaking eastern regions declared continuing loyalty to Yanukovych.

=== Protests ===
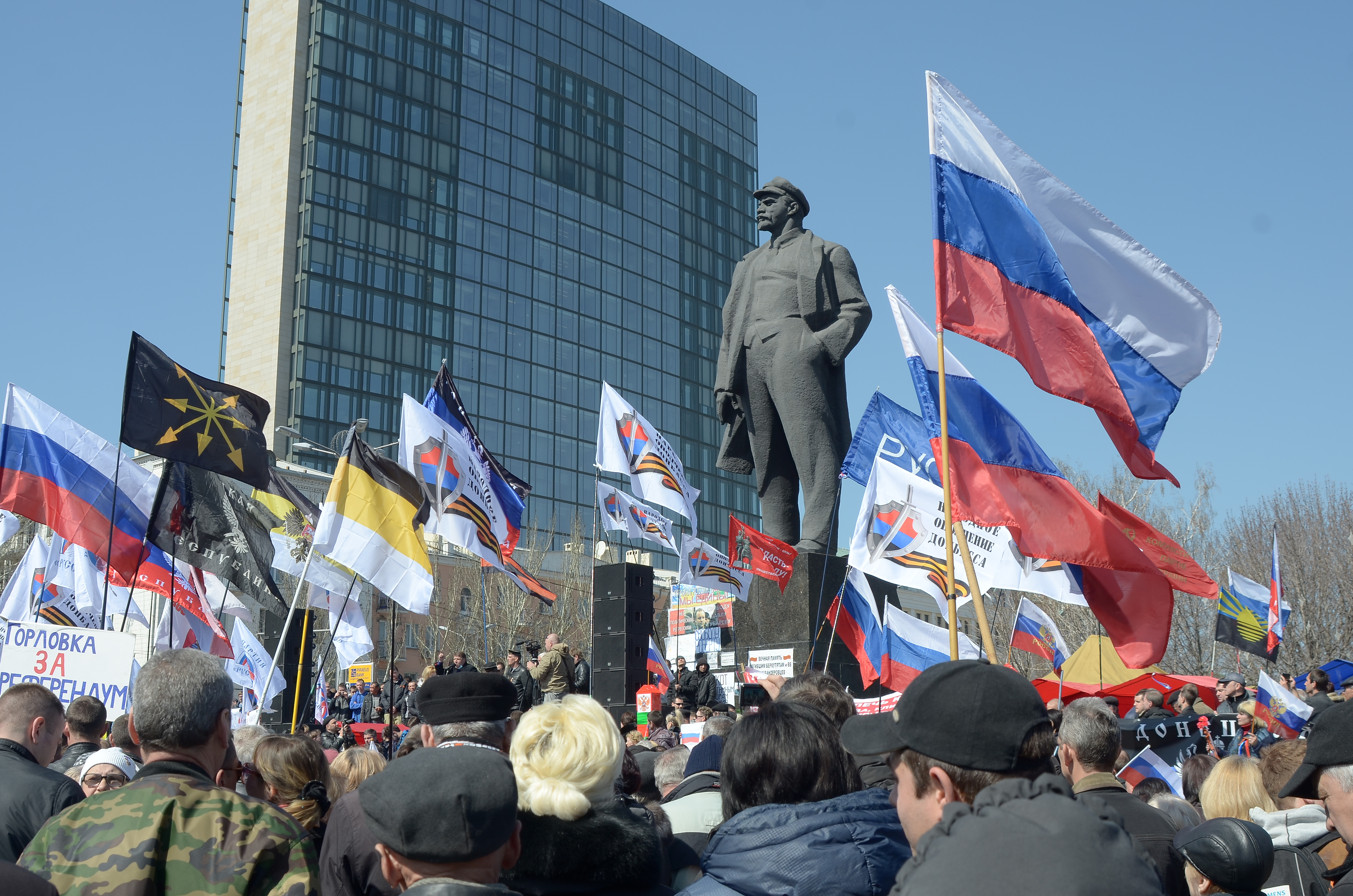
Pro-Russian protest at Lenin Square, Donetsk, 6 April 2014, with flags of Russia, the Russian Empire, and the Eurasianist Movement.

9 March 2014, pro-Ukrainian rally in Luhansk in honor of the 200th anniversary of the birth of Ukrainian poet, writer and artist Taras Shevchenko.

Footage of the attack by pro-Russian separatists on the pro-Ukrainian demonstration in Luhansk, 9 March 2014.

From late February 2014, demonstrations by pro-Russian, separatist, and counter-revolutionary groups took place in several cities in eastern and southern Ukraine. Most of the protests were in the Donbas region, made up of Donetsk Oblast and Luhansk Oblast. In the last census, the population of the Donbas was about 58% ethnic Ukrainian and 38% ethnic Russian (Donetsk was 57% Ukrainian and 38% Russian, while Luhansk was 58% Ukrainian and 39% Russian). A national survey held in March–April 2014 found that 58% of respondents in the Donbas wanted to remain part of a unitary or federal Ukraine, while 31% wanted the region to separate from Ukraine. There were smaller protests in Kharkiv and Odesa.

Pro-Ukrainian demonstrations also took place in Donetsk and Luhansk oblasts. In Donetsk, rallies supporting Ukrainian unity took place in early March, including a large demonstration on 4 March, while pro-Ukrainian rallies were also held in Kramatorsk and Mariupol. On 9 March 2014, a rally in Luhansk commemorating the 200th anniversary of the birth of Ukrainian poet Taras Shevchenko was attacked by pro-Russian counter-demonstrators. The Eastern-Ukrainian Centre for Civic Initiatives later documented the violent dispersal of the gathering and the police's failure to maintain order.

The first pro-Russian protests were largely native expressions of discontent with the new Ukrainian government. On 23 February 2014, Ukraine's parliament adopted a bill to revoke the status of Russian as an official state language. The bill was not enacted, but the proposal caused anger among some Russian speakers in Ukraine. In the last census, 75% of people in Donetsk Oblast and 69% of people in Luhansk Oblast had Russian as their mother tongue, although most Ukrainian citizens spoke both Ukrainian and Russian. These regions mostly consumed Russia-based media, which promoted the narrative that Ukraine's new government was an illegitimate "fascist junta" and that ethnic Russians were in imminent danger.

Russia used the protests to launch a campaign of political warfare, information warfare, and irregular warfare against Ukraine. Leaked e-mails and telephone calls later revealed that the Russian state had funded the separatists and had organised separatist protests, mainly through Kremlin advisers Vladislav Surkov and Sergey Glazyev. Ukrainian authorities arrested local separatist leaders in early March. Those leaders were replaced by men with ties to the Russian security services and Russian business interests.

On 6 April 2014, hundreds of masked men stormed and seized weapons from the Security Service buildings in the cities of Donetsk and Luhansk. Protesters then stormed and occupied the Donetsk regional government headquarters, raising the Russian flag and demanding a referendum on joining Russia. The next day, the activists held a meeting in the building and proclaimed the "Donetsk People's Republic" an independent state. On 29 April, armed pro-Russian activists stormed and occupied the Luhansk regional government headquarters, proclaiming the "Luhansk People's Republic."

== Causes ==
According to political scientist Paul D'Anieri, Russia had the following four causes to start its war with Ukraine in 2014, as well as for the 2022 war:

- Russia's desire to regain control of Ukraine and turn it into a puppet regime.
- Russia's conception of itself as a great power entitled to a sphere of influence over the former Soviet Republics.
- The security dilemma in Europe, with Russia perceiving the expansion of NATO as a threat and other East European states desiring guarantees against Russian expansionism.
- Democratic Ukraine being perceived by Russia as a political threat to the authoritarian regime in Russia.

== History ==
The Russian occupation of Crimea is usually deemed to be the start of the Russo-Ukrainian war. This was followed by the War in Donbas (2014–2022) and then the 2022 Russian invasion of Ukraine, which started the current phase of the war.

=== Historiography ===
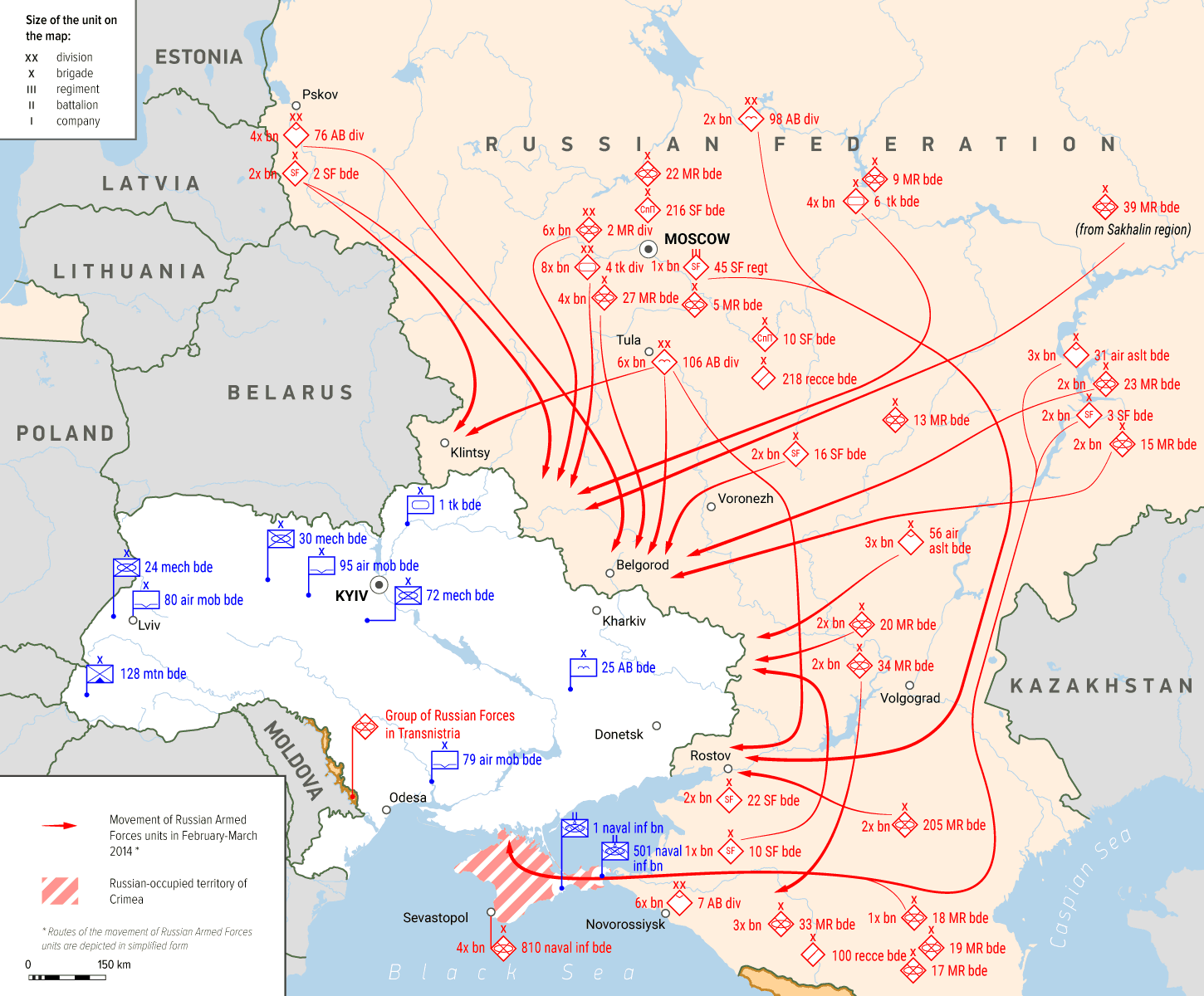
Movements of the Russian military to Ukraine's borders and into Crimea in February–March 2014

Different start dates for the conflict have been identified. According to a number of scholars, the war began with the February 2014 Russian occupation of Crimea, in particular the 27 February storming of the Crimean parliament. The Ukrainian government declared 26 February the "Day of Resistance to the Occupation of Crimea," as on that day in 2014 a Crimean Tatar rally was held to oppose Russian interference. Some, including political scientist Andreas Umland, prefer 20 February – the day Russia supposedly issued orders to prepare for the invasion of Crimea, which is also the date engraved on the Russian Crimea campaign medal. Dutch Professor of Military History, Floribert Baudet, asserted that "Russia's war against Ukraine did not start in 2014 with the annexation of Crimea" because Russia had been subverting Ukrainian sovereignty long before this.

Analysts also differ over the nature of the conflict. Paul D'Anieri describes "a limited war in 2014, and then [a] much less limited war in 2022." In contrast, Ukrainian-American historian Serhii Plokhy said in 2023 of the then-ongoing war that "I decline the temptation to identify the date of February 24, 2022, as its beginning, no matter the shock and drama of the all-out Russian assault on Ukraine, for the simple reason that the war began eight years earlier, on February 27, 2014."

=== Russian annexation of Crimea (2014) ===
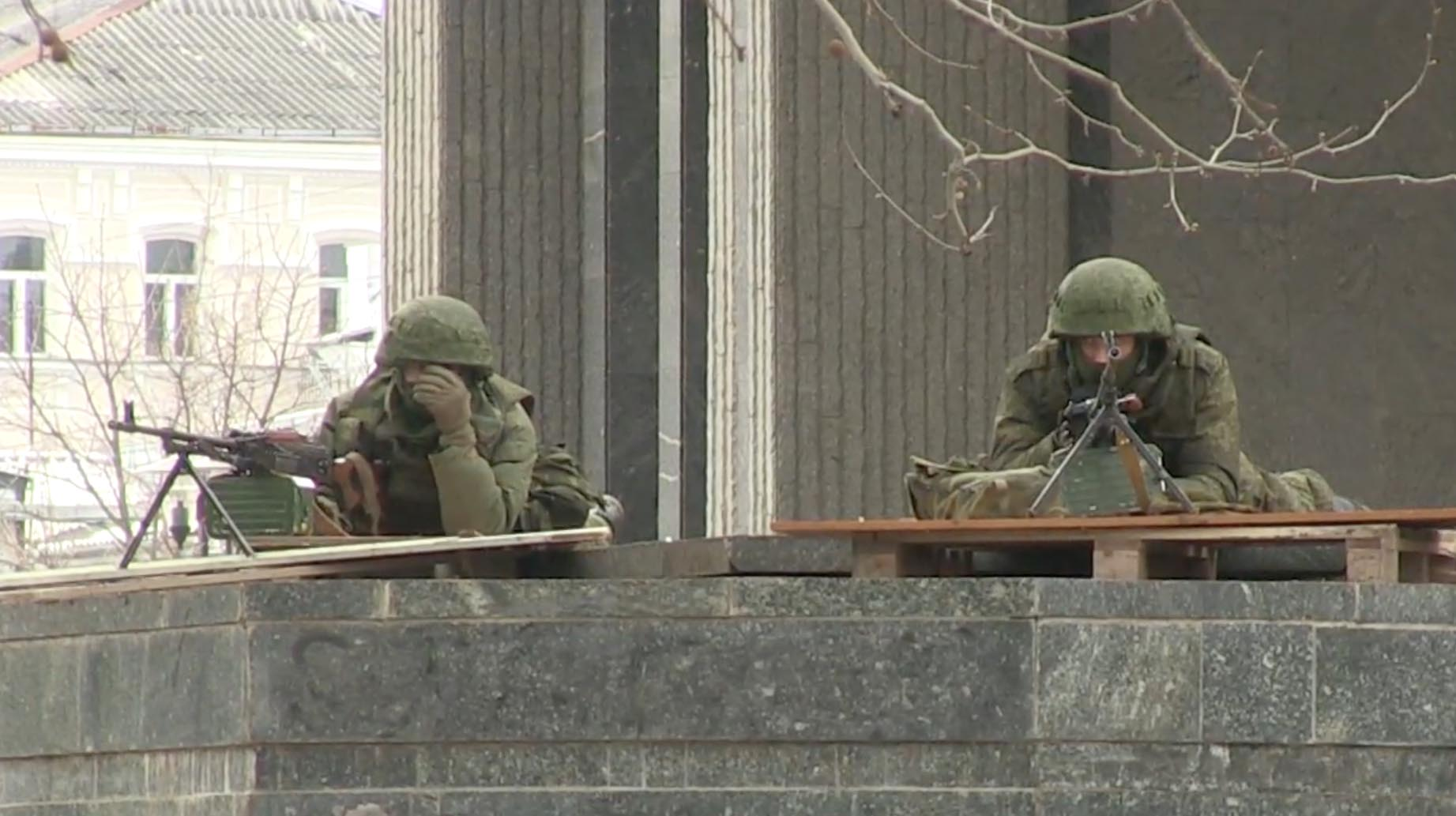
Russian troops occupying the Crimean parliament building, 1 March 2014

On 27 February 2014, Russian soldiers without insignia began to occupy Crimea. At first, Russia denied that the soldiers were theirs, instead claiming they were local "self-defense" units. Later, Putin admitted that they were Russian special forces and said that he decided to "return" Crimea to Russia when the revolution happened. Russia took advantage of the uncertainty in Ukraine immediately after the ousting of Yanukovych.

The unmarked Russian soldiers seized the Crimean parliament and government buildings in Simferopol, as well as setting up checkpoints to restrict movement and cut off the Crimean peninsula from the rest of Ukraine. While the armed men occupied Crimea's parliament, it dismissed the Crimean government and installed a pro-Russian government under Sergey Aksyonov, whose party won only 4% of votes in the last election. Historian Andrew Wilson and journalist Luke Harding called this the "Crimean coup." The parliament then announced a referendum on Crimea's status. No journalists had been allowed inside, and some MPs said votes had been cast for them even though they were not present. Russian rebel commander Igor 'Strelkov' Girkin later admitted:

Unfortunately, I saw no support from public authorities in Simferopol ... Rebels assembled lawmakers to corral them into the hall so that they could vote. I was one of the commanders of those rebels. I saw that from the inside.

On 1 March, the Federation Council of Russia approved the use of armed force in Ukraine. Ukraine's prime minister, Arseniy Yatsenyuk, said that Russian military intervention would be the beginning of war, and Ukraine's representative told the UN Security Council that Russia was committing "an act of aggression against the state of Ukraine". Unmarked Russian special forces occupied airports and communications centres, and blockaded Ukrainian military bases, such as the Southern Naval Base. Russian cyberattacks shut down websites of the Ukrainian government, news media, and social media. Cyberattacks also enabled Russian access to the mobile phones of Ukrainian officials and members of parliament, further disrupting communications.

The referendum was held under Russian occupation on 16 March 2014. According to the Russian-installed authorities, the result was in favour of joining Russia. It annexed Crimea on 18 March 2014. It was the first time since World War II that a European country had annexed part of another. Following this, Russian forces seized Ukrainian military bases in Crimea and captured their personnel. On 24 March, Ukraine ordered its remaining troops to withdraw. On 15 April, Ukraine's parliament declared Crimea temporarily occupied by Russia. Russia militarized the peninsula and made nuclear threats. In his Crimean speech, Putin said Crimea had always been Russian and should never have become part of an independent Ukraine. He claimed that Russia did not want to take any other regions of Ukraine.

When Russia invaded Crimea, Ukraine was a neutral country under its Constitution, and Ukraine's post-revolutionary government was not seeking NATO membership. In response to Russia's annexation and further attacks on Ukraine, some NATO members agreed to begin training the Ukrainian army.

=== War in the Donbas (2014–2021) ===
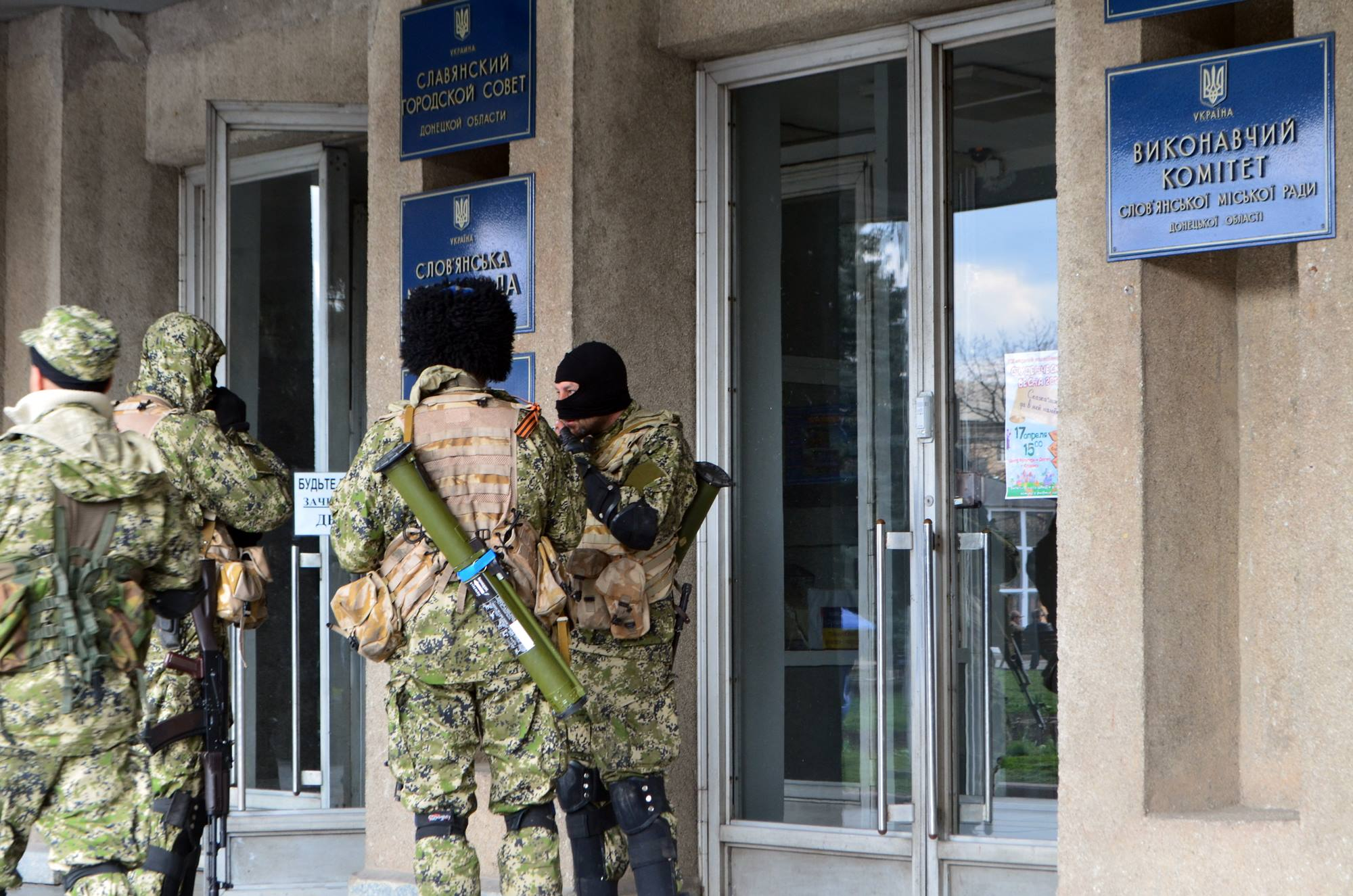
Russian-aligned troops occupying Sloviansk city administration building, 14 April 2014

In April 2014, the anti-government protests in the Donbas developed into armed conflict between Russian-backed separatists and Ukraine. Russian citizens with links to its security forces had taken control of the separatist movement by this stage. Russia deployed 30,000–40,000 troops near Ukraine's eastern border in early April. This military buildup was used to threaten Ukraine and hinder its response to the pro-Russian separatists, causing the Ukrainian military to divert its forces to the border instead of the Donbas. Russia began a "hybrid" conflict against Ukraine, involving disinformation, irregular fighters, regular Russian troops, and conventional military support.

==== First months of the war ====
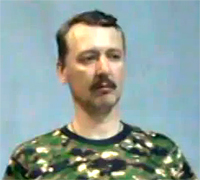
Russian commander Igor 'Strelkov' Girkin, who admitted sparking the Donbas war in April 2014

On 12 April 2014, a heavily armed paramilitary unit crossed the border from Russia into Ukraine and took over Sloviansk and Kramatorsk in Donetsk Oblast. They raided the police and Security Service (SBU) buildings, seizing a large amount of weapons, which were given to local pro-Russian separatists. The unit of more than 50 militants, sent from occupied Crimea, wore no insignia. They included fighters from Russia and Ukraine, commanded by former GRU colonel Igor 'Strelkov' Girkin. In an interview for Russian ultranationalist newspaper Zavtra, he said that this action sparked the war in eastern Ukraine:

I'm the one who pulled the trigger of this war. If our unit hadn't crossed the border, everything would have fizzled out, like in Kharkiv or Odesa.

The first conflict deaths in the Donbas occurred on 13 April, when the Russian paramilitaries fired on Ukrainian SBU officers outside Sloviansk. Ukrainian officer Gennady Bilichenko was killed and several wounded, while at least one Russian militant was killed by return fire. In response, on 15 April, the interim Ukrainian government launched an "Anti-Terrorist Operation" (ATO) in the Donbas. However, Ukrainian forces were poorly prepared, and the operation soon stalled. Russian separatist commander Strelkov said that Ukrainian forces were "extremely cautious" at first, as they did not know how Russia would respond. Due to worsening unrest in Donbas and the Russian military buildup near the border, Ukraine's armed forces reinstated conscription and were put on full alert for an invasion.

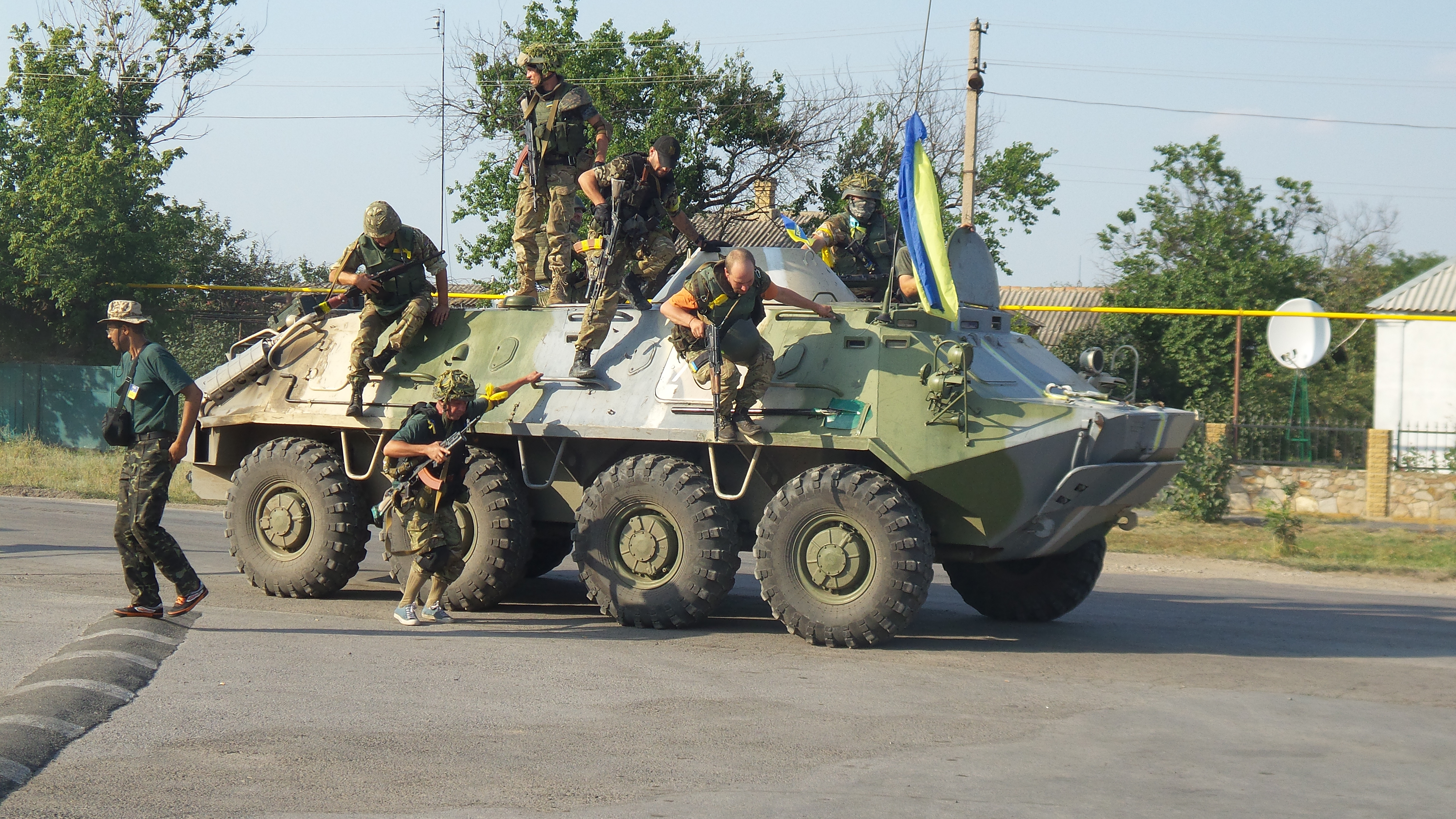
Ukrainian Donbas Battalion soldiers in the war zone, August 2014

Pro-Russian forces carried out their first civilian killings in the Donbas on 17 April. They kidnapped local councillor Volodymyr Rybak after he tried to re-raise the Ukrainian flag in Horlivka. His body was dumped in a river along with those of Maidan activists Yuri Popravko and Yuri Diakovskyi – all had been tortured and mutilated. Russian paramilitaries kidnapped more than two dozen people in the first month of the war, including eight OSCE observers and journalists such as Simon Ostrovsky.

The separatists were supported with weaponry, artillery, armoured vehicles and volunteers from Russia, including Chechen and Cossack fighters. Putin gave legitimacy to the separatists when he described the Donbas as part of the historical imperial territory of "New Russia" (Novorossiya) and suggested it should never have become part of Ukraine. The separatists then began attempting to create a new entity called "Novorossiya".

The First Battle of Donetsk Airport was the first between Ukrainian and separatist forces that involved large numbers of Russian "volunteers".

Petro Poroshenko won the Ukrainian presidential elections in May. The separatist groups held disputed referendums that month, which were not recognised by Ukraine or any other UN member state.

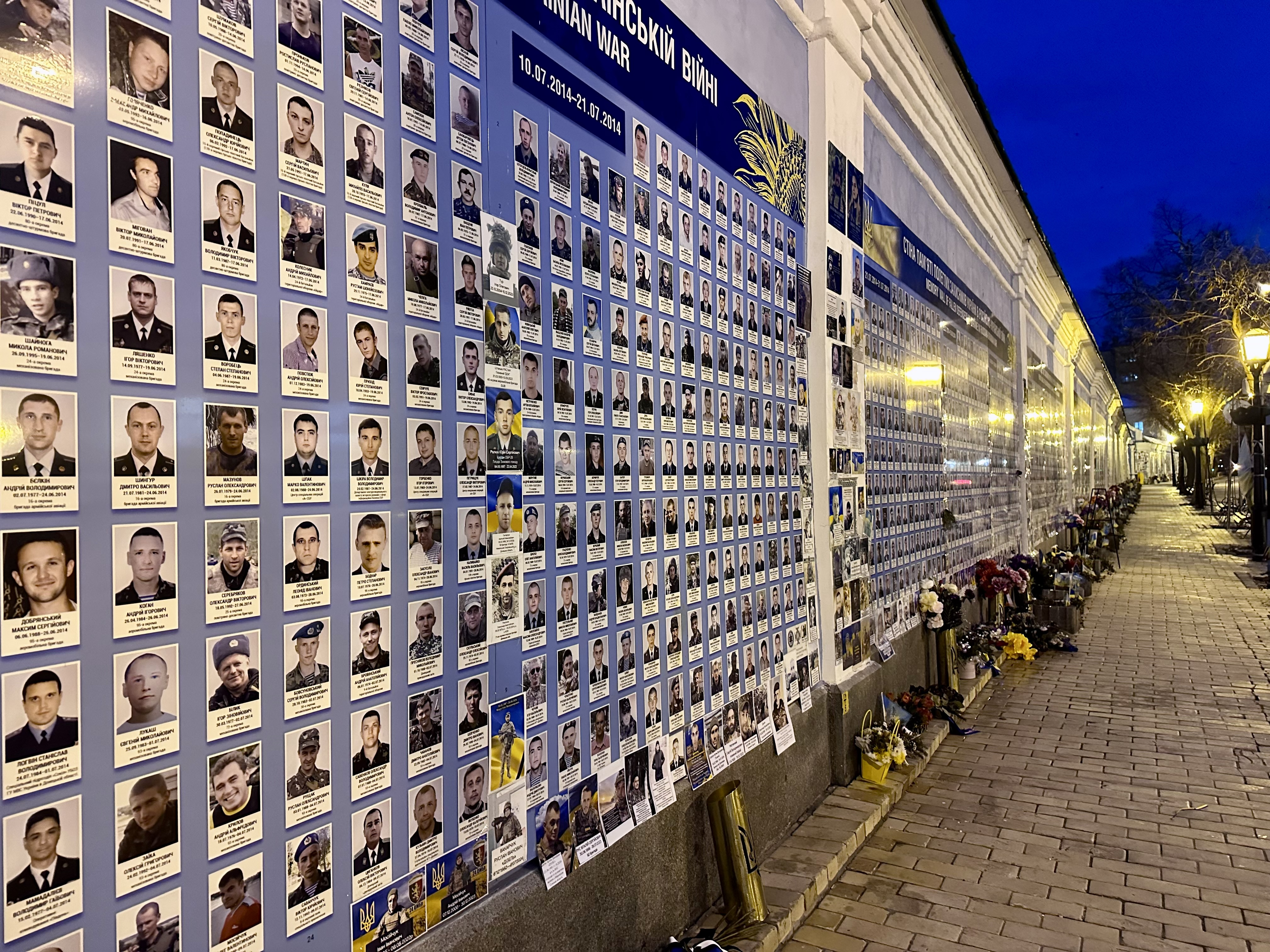
Wall of Remembrance of Ukrainian soldiers killed in the Russo-Ukrainian War

On 5 July 2014, Ukrainian forces re-took Sloviansk and the pro-Russian forces retreated to Donetsk city. Russian commander Igor 'Strelkov' Girkin said that Donetsk was still relatively peaceful until then. He admitted responsibility for the shelling of the city by Ukrainian forces.

On 17 July 2014, Russian-controlled forces killed 298 civilians when they shot down a passenger aircraft, Malaysia Airlines Flight 17, as it was flying over eastern Ukraine. Investigations and the recovery of bodies began in the conflict zone as fighting continued.

By the end of July, Ukrainian forces were pushing into cities, isolating Donetsk and attempting to restore control of the border. By 28 July, the strategic heights of Savur-Mohyla were under Ukrainian control, along with the city of Debaltseve, an important railroad hub. These Ukrainian successes threatened the existence of the DPR and LPR statelets, prompting Russian cross-border shelling targeting Ukrainian troops on their own soil, from mid-July onwards.

==== August 2014 Russian invasion ====
June–August 2014 progression map

By August 2014, Ukrainian forces had regained much of the territory seized by the separatists. Igor Girkin ('Strelkov') urged direct Russian military intervention and said that the combat inexperience of his irregular forces, along with recruitment difficulties amongst the local population, had caused the setbacks. He stated, "Losing this war on the territory that President Vladimir Putin personally named New Russia would threaten the Kremlin's power and, personally, the power of the president". Strelkov said that in early August, Russian soldiers, supposedly on "vacation" from the army, began to arrive in Donbas. According to Nikolai Mitrokhin's estimates, by mid-August 2014 during the Battle of Ilovaisk, between 20,000 and 25,000 troops were fighting in the Donbas on the separatist side, and only 40–45% were "locals."

Russia dispatched what it called a "humanitarian convoy" of trucks across the border on 22 August 2014. Ukraine's security service called this a "direct invasion" and said the trucks were being used to move weapons and bring the bodies of Russian soldiers out of Ukraine.

Russia then began a more direct invasion of the Donbas. On 24 August 2014, Amvrosiivka was occupied by Russian paratroopers, supported by 250 armoured vehicles and artillery pieces. On 25 August, a column of Russian military vehicles was reported to have crossed into Ukraine near Novoazovsk on the Azov Sea coast. It appeared headed towards Ukrainian-held Mariupol, in an area that had not seen pro-Russian presence for weeks. The following day, the Russian Defence Ministry said these soldiers had crossed the border "by accident". Russian troops captured Novoazovsk and began deporting Ukrainians who did not have an address registered within the city. Pro-Ukrainian anti-war protests took place in Mariupol. The UN Security Council called an emergency meeting.

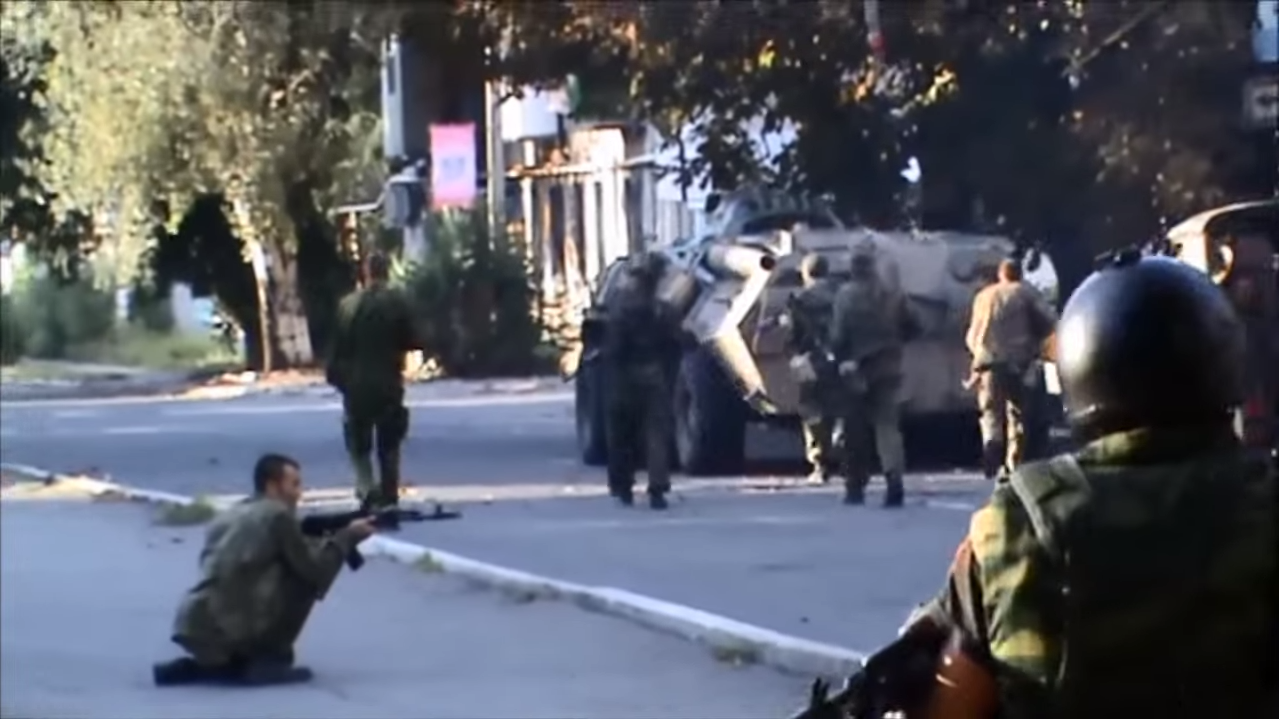
Russian-backed forces attacking Iloviask, 23 August 2014

The Pskov-based 76th Guards Air Assault Division of the Russian Airborne Forces allegedly entered Ukrainian territory in August and engaged in a skirmish near Luhansk, suffering 70–80 dead. The Ukrainian Defence Ministry said that they had seized two of the unit's armoured vehicles near Luhansk and reported destroying another three tanks and two armoured vehicles in other regions.

The speaker of Russia's upper house of parliament and Russian state television channels acknowledged that Russian soldiers were in Ukraine but referred to them as "volunteers" fighting for the "Russian world." A reporter for Novaya Gazeta, an opposition newspaper in Russia, stated that the Russian military leadership paid soldiers to resign their commissions and fight in Ukraine in the early summer of 2014 and then began ordering soldiers into Ukraine. Russian opposition MP Lev Shlosberg made similar statements, although he said they were "regular Russian troops" disguised as units of the DPR and LPR. After Ukraine captured ten Russian soldiers in Eastern Ukraine, a Russian defence ministry source stated they were in Ukraine "by accident" while patrolling a section of the Russian-Ukrainian border.

==== Minsk agreement and continued fighting ====
A map of the line of control and buffer zone established by the Minsk Protocol on 5 September 2014

On 3 September 2014, Poroshenko said he and Putin had reached a "permanent ceasefire" agreement. Russia denied this, denying that it was a party to the conflict, adding that "they only discussed how to settle the conflict." Poroshenko then recanted. On 5 September, Russia's Permanent OSCE Representative Andrey Kelin said that it was natural that pro-Russian separatists "are going to liberate" Mariupol. Ukrainian forces stated that Russian intelligence groups had been spotted in the area. Kelin said, 'There might be volunteers over there.' On 4 September 2014, a NATO officer said that several thousand regular Russian forces were operating in Ukraine.

On 5 September 2014, the Minsk Protocol ceasefire agreement drew a line of demarcation between Ukraine and separatist-controlled portions of Donetsk and Luhansk Oblasts.

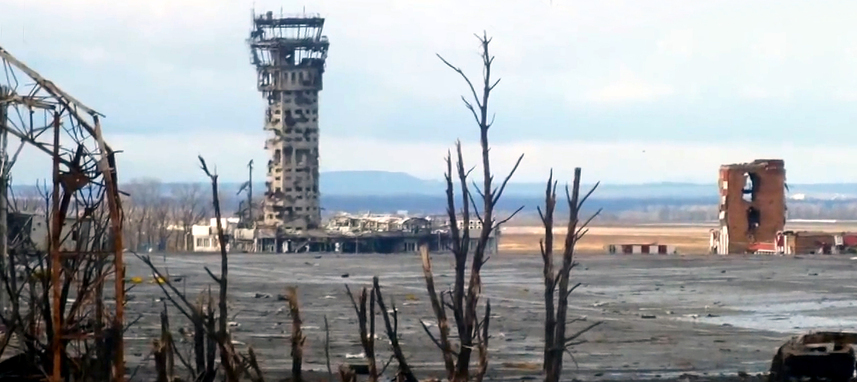
Ruined control tower during the Second Battle of Donetsk Airport in December 2014

Despite the Minsk ceasefire, sporadic clashes continued around Donetsk International Airport, the last part of Donetsk city held by Ukrainian troops. On 28 September, Russian-backed forces began an offensive to capture the airport. Ukrainian troops were besieged in the terminal and control tower. They were given the nickname "Cyborgs" as they withstood repeated Russian attacks in grim battlefield conditions. The siege lasted throughout winter, and most of the airport was destroyed by shelling. Eventually, on 21 January 2015, rebels took the airport with help from Russian special forces.

On 7 and 12 November, NATO officials reconfirmed the Russian presence, citing 32 tanks, 16 howitzer cannons, and 30 trucks of troops entering the country. NATO said it had seen an increase in Russian tanks, artillery pieces, and other heavy military equipment in Ukraine and renewed its call for Moscow to withdraw its forces. The Chicago Council on Global Affairs stated that Russian separatists enjoyed technical advantages over the Ukrainian army since the large inflow of advanced military systems in mid-2014: effective anti-aircraft weapons ("Buk" and MANPADS) suppressed Ukrainian air strikes, Russian drones provided intelligence, and the Russian secure communications system disrupted Ukrainian communications intelligence. The Russian side employed electronic warfare systems that Ukraine lacked. Similar conclusions about the technical advantage of the Russian separatists were voiced by the Conflict Studies Research Centre.

Ukraine declared the Russian-backed separatist republics to be terrorist organisations.

==== Minsk II agreement and battle of Debaltseve ====
In January 2015, Donetsk, Luhansk, and Mariupol represented the three battle fronts. Poroshenko described a dangerous escalation on 21 January amid reports of more than 2,000 additional Russian troops, 200 tanks, and armed personnel carriers crossing the border. He abbreviated his visit to the World Economic Forum because of his concerns.

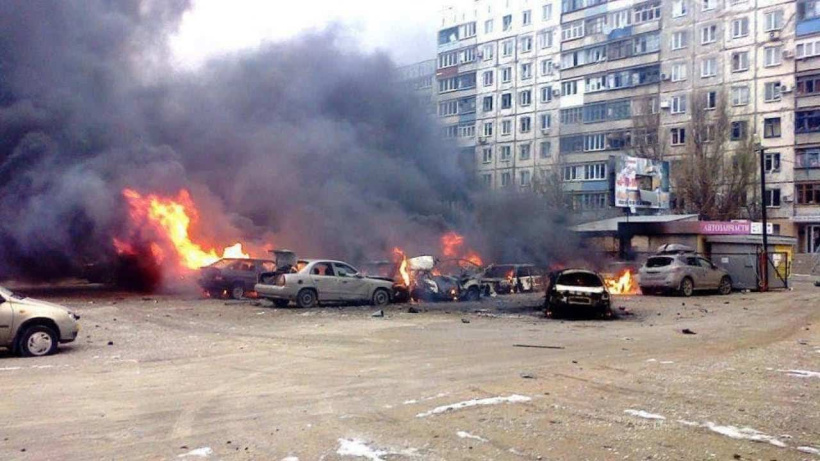
Damage from a Russian rocket attack on Mariupol, January 2015

A new package of measures to end the conflict, known as Minsk II, was agreed on 12 February 2015, with a ceasefire due to begin on 15 February.

Despite the ceasefire, Russian-backed forces launched an offensive on Debaltseve, a strategic town and salient held by Ukrainian forces. By 18 February 2015, the 8,000 Ukrainian troops were close to surrounded and had been forced to retreat from Debaltseve under relentless fire, suffering heavy casualties. Russian-backed rebel leader Alexander Zakharchenko had said his forces would not observe the ceasefire in Debaltseve, claiming it rightfully belonged to them. Ukraine, the EU, and the US accused Russia and its proxies of breaking the ceasefire and said that the Russian military itself took part in the offensive.

In September 2015 the United Nations Human Rights Office estimated that 8,000 casualties had resulted from the conflict in eastern Ukraine.

==== Static war ====
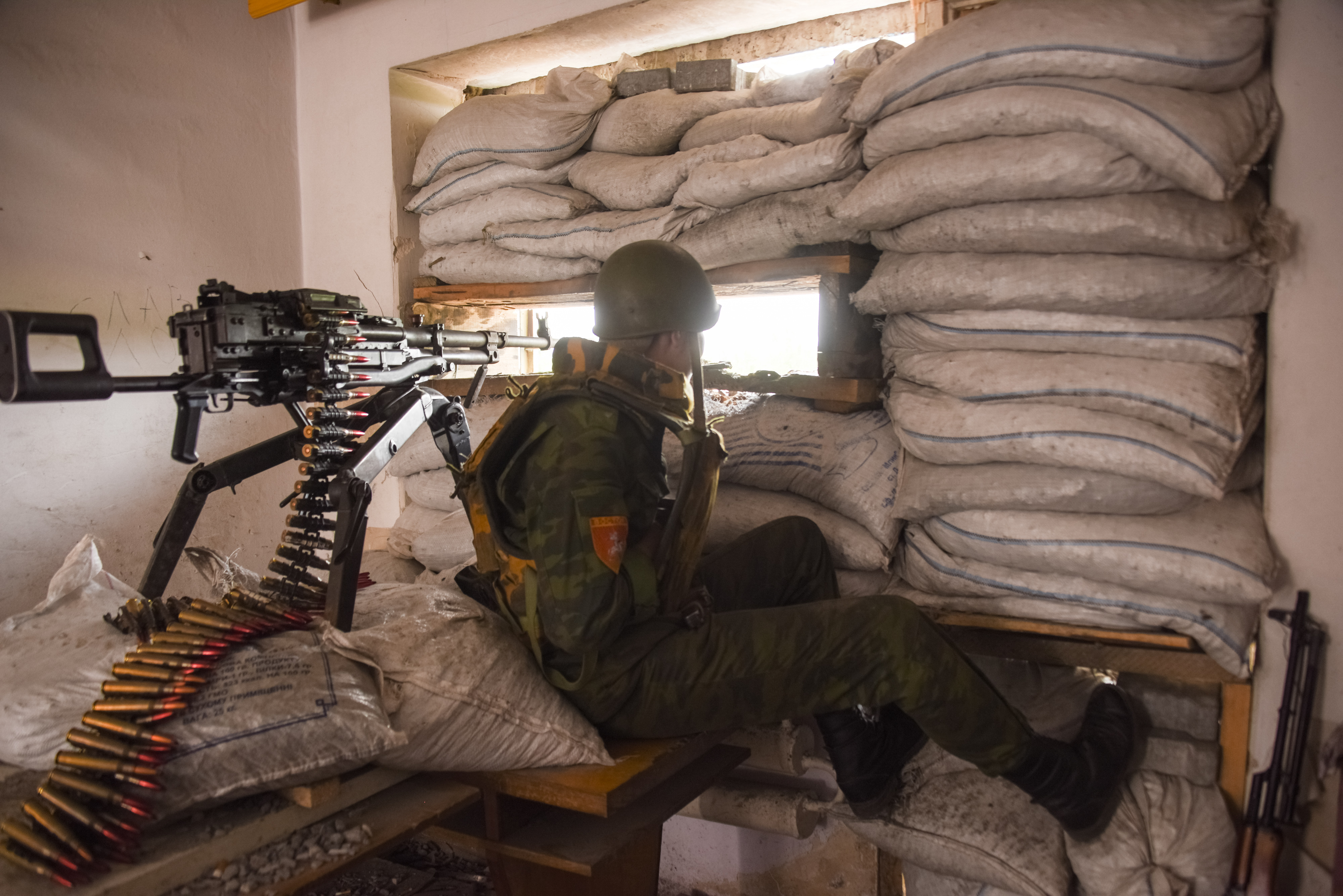
A pro-Russian rebel looking though a firing port near Donetsk, May 2015

After the Minsk agreements, there were few changes in territorial control, while the war settled into static trench warfare around the agreed line of contact, marked by artillery duels and special forces operations. Hostilities never ceased for a substantial period of time but continued at a low level despite repeated attempts at ceasefire. Both sides began fortifying their position by building networks of trenches, bunkers and tunnels. The relatively static conflict was labelled "frozen" by some, though fighting never completely stopped. Between 2014 and 2022 there were 29 ceasefires, each agreed to remain in force indefinitely. However, none of them lasted more than two weeks.

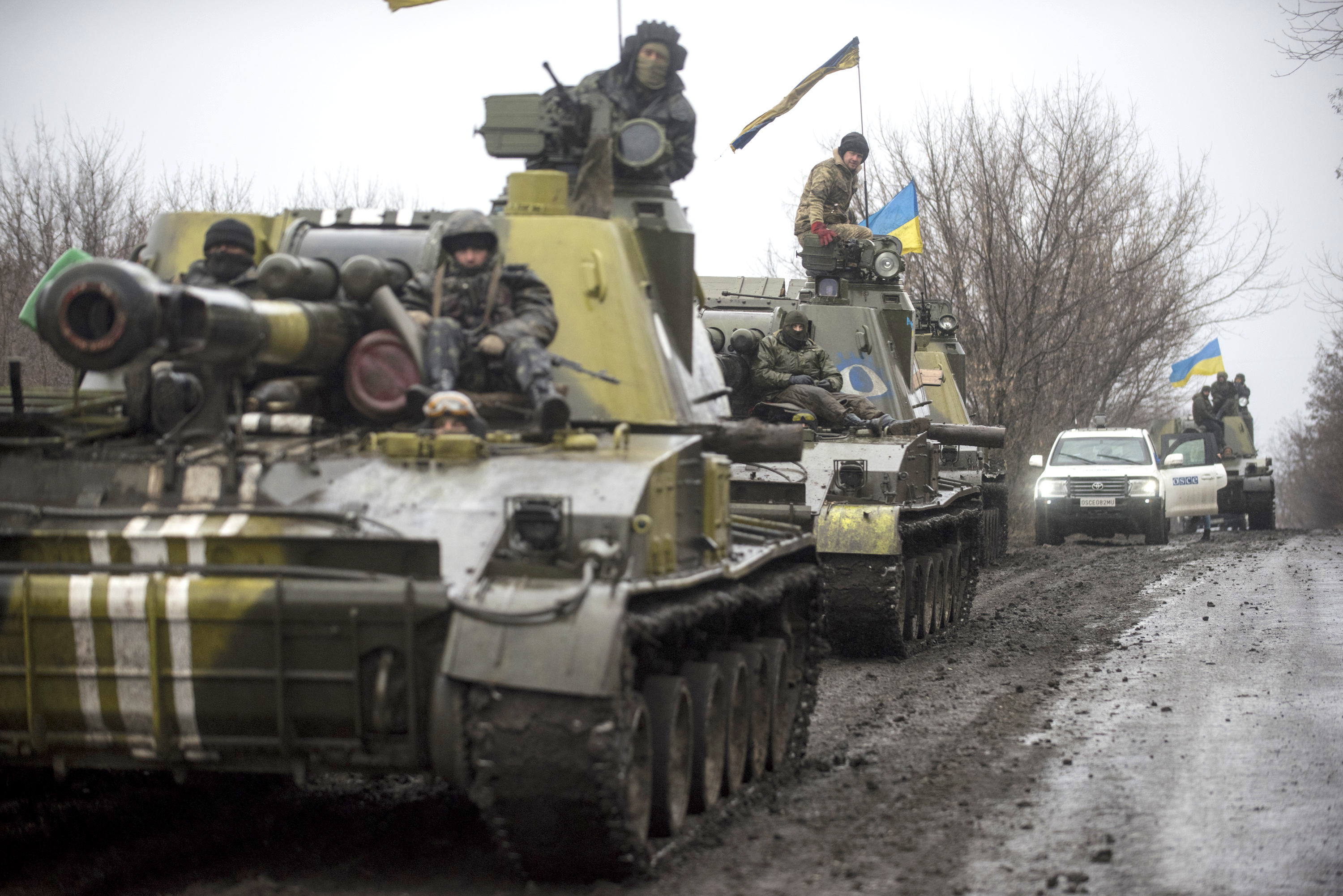
OSCE observers overseeing the withdrawal of Ukrainian heavy weaponry from the warzone, March 2015

US and international officials continued to report the active presence of the Russian military in eastern Ukraine, including in the Debaltseve area. In 2015, Russian separatist forces were estimated to number around 36,000 troops (compared to 34,000 Ukrainian), of whom 8,500–10,000 were Russian soldiers. Additionally, around 1,000 GRU troops were operating in the area. Another 2015 estimate held that Ukrainian forces outnumbered Russian forces 40,000 to 20,000. In 2017, on average, one Ukrainian soldier died in combat every three days, with an estimated 6,000 Russian and 40,000 separatist troops in the region.

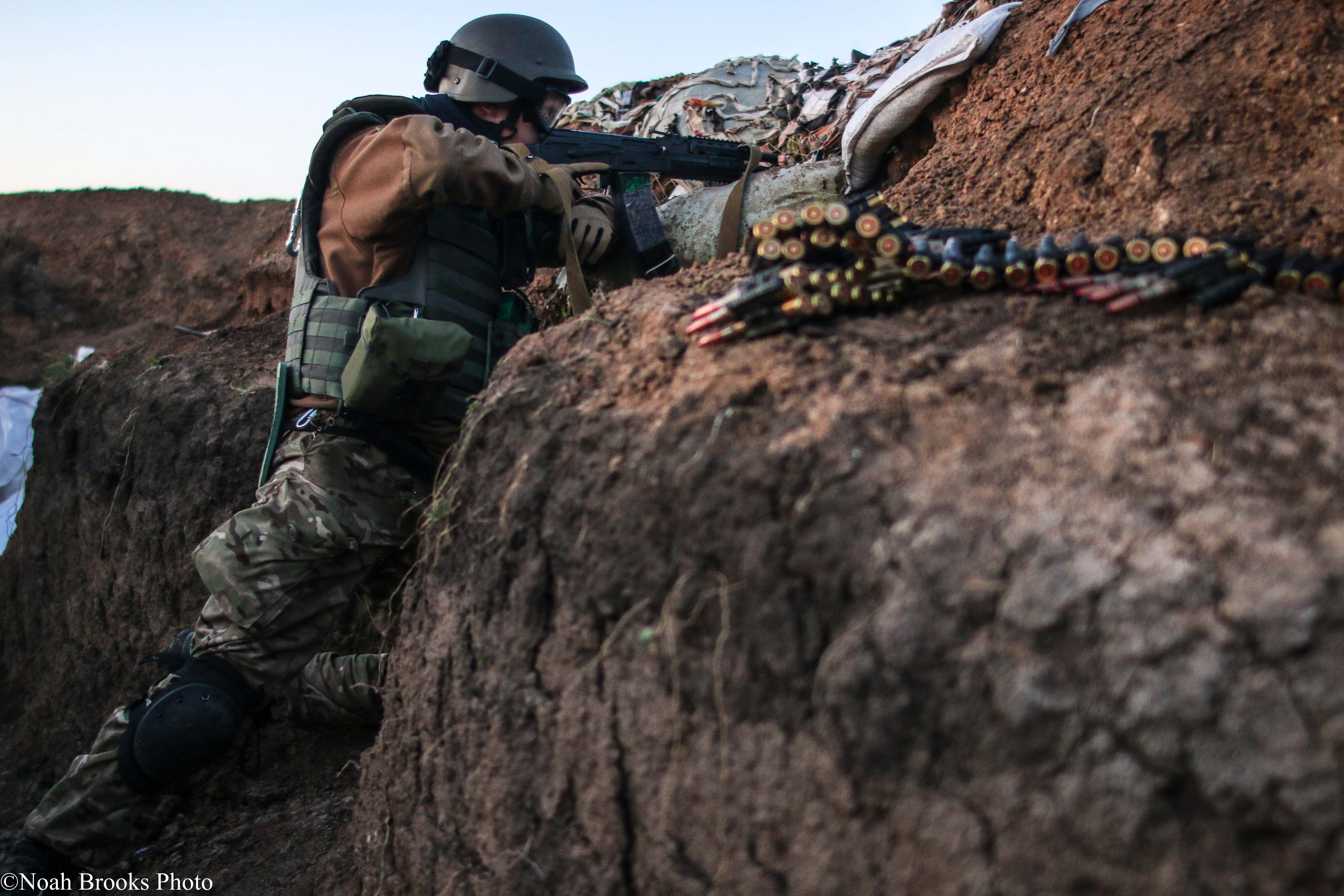
A Ukrainian soldier in a trench in the Donbas, 2015

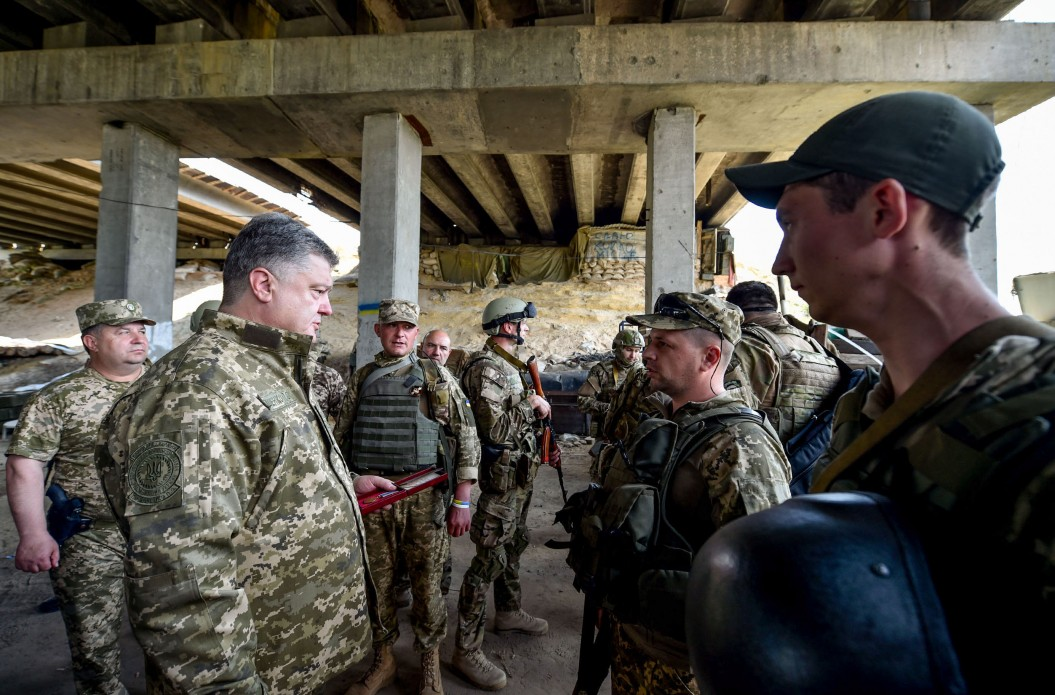
Ukrainian president Petro Poroshenko inspects Ukrainian positions at the frontline, June 2016

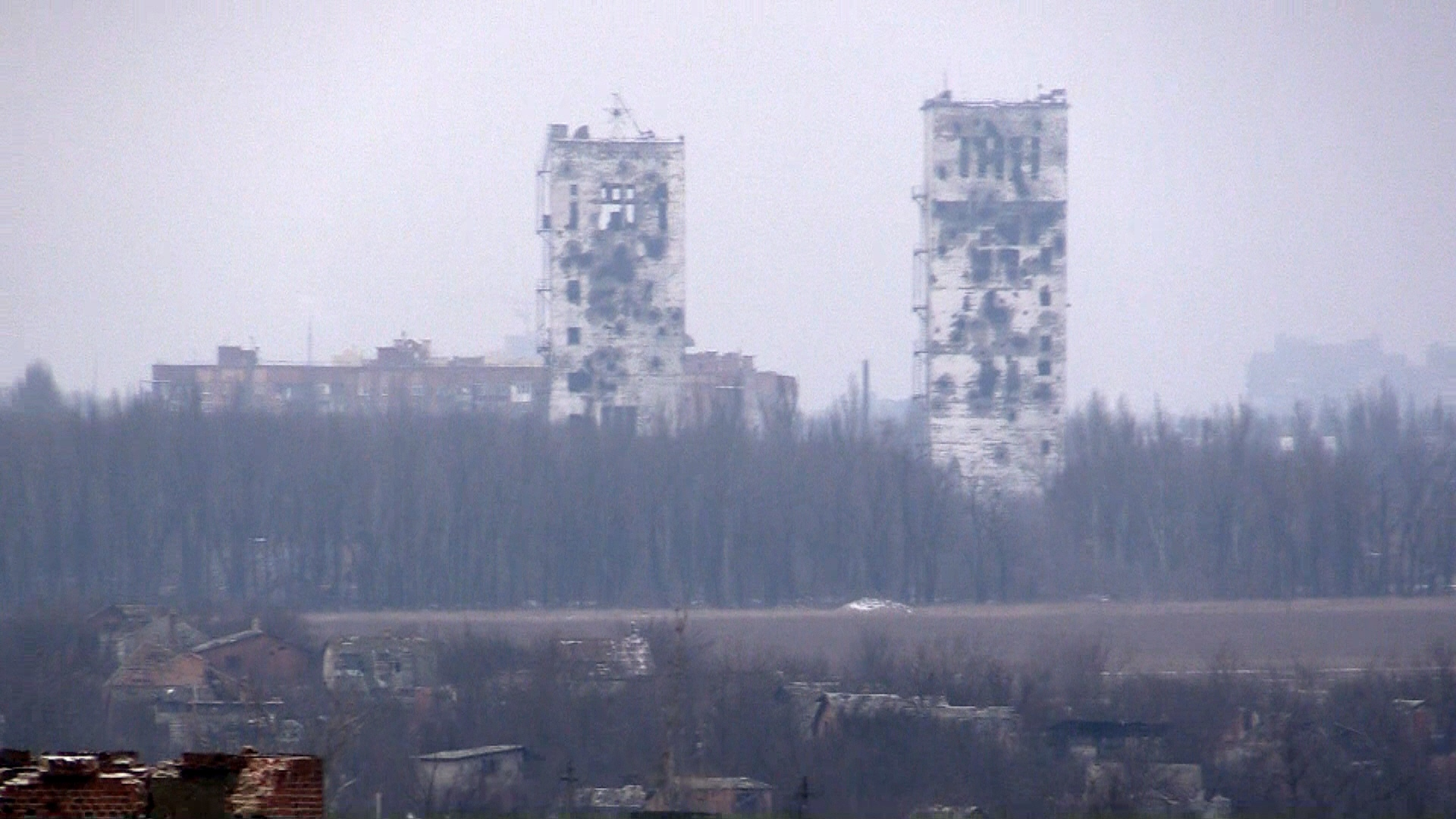
Buildings damaged by shellfire near Avdiivka, January 2017

The Battle of Avdiivka erupted on 29 January 2017 and lasted for several days. It saw the biggest and deadliest clashes in over a year, with more than thirty people killed and heavy artillery barrages. It began hours after newly elected US President Donald Trump spoke by telephone with the Russian President Putin. Some in the Ukrainian government believed that Trump's election emboldened the Russian-backed rebels. Kostiatyn Yeliseieiv, deputy head of the Ukrainian presidential administration, said it was "a test from the Russian side, of the reaction of the new American administration."

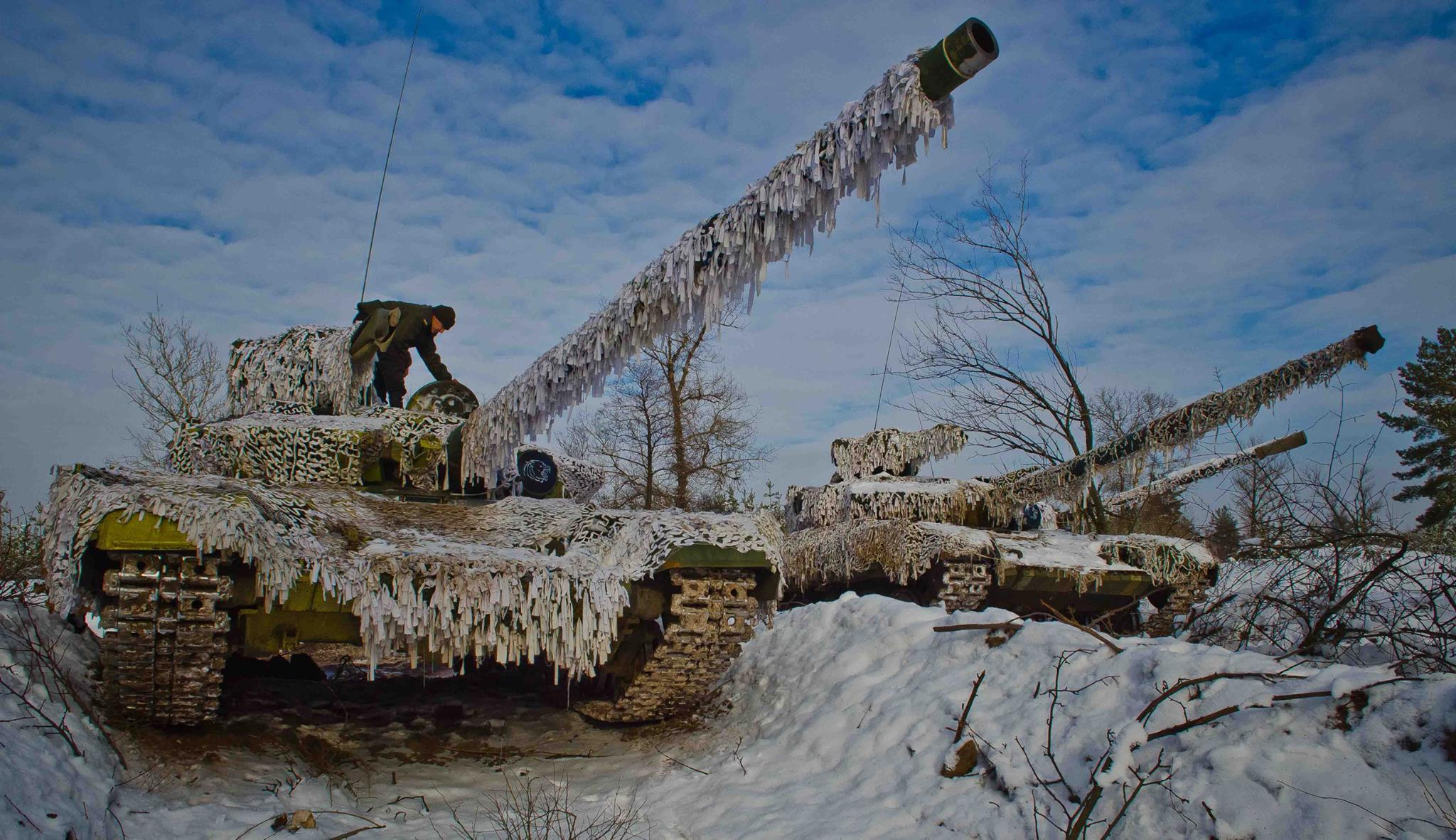
Ukrainian T-64 tanks in the Donbas during the 'static war' phase

More than 110 Ukrainian soldiers were killed in the conflict in 2019. In May 2019, newly elected Ukrainian President Volodymyr Zelenskyy took office, promising to end the war in Donbas. In December 2019, Ukraine and pro-Russian separatists began swapping prisoners of war. Around 200 prisoners were exchanged on 29 December 2019. In December 2019 Ukraine and Russia agreed to implement a ceasefire. The two sides agreed to swap prisoners of war and disengage military forces in several regions. Russia and Ukraine could not agree on the issues of the withdrawal of Russian-backed troops and the elections in the separatist-held regions.

According to Ukrainian authorities, 50 Ukrainian soldiers were killed in 2020. Between 2019 and 2021, Russia issued over 650,000 internal Russian passports to Ukrainians. There were 27 conflict-related civilian deaths in 2019, 26 deaths in 2020, and 25 deaths in 2021, over half of them from mines and unexploded ordnance.

=== Prelude to full-scale invasion ===
From March to April 2021, Russia began a major military build-up near the Ukrainian border, followed by a second build-up from October 2021 onward, in both Russia and Belarus. Throughout, Russia said it was only holding military exercises, and Russia's government repeatedly denied it had plans to attack Ukraine.

In early December 2021, following Russian denials, the US released intelligence of Russian invasion plans, including satellite photographs showing Russian troops and equipment near the border. The intelligence reported a Russian list of key sites and individuals to be killed or neutralised. The US released multiple reports that accurately predicted the invasion plans.

In the months preceding the invasion, Russian officials accused Ukraine of inciting tensions, Russophobia, and repressing Russian speakers. They made multiple security demands of Ukraine, NATO, and other EU countries. On 9 December 2021, Putin said that "Russophobia is a first step towards genocide". Putin's claims were dismissed by the international community, and Russian claims of genocide were rejected as baseless. In a 21 February speech, Putin questioned the legitimacy of the Ukrainian state, repeating an inaccurate claim that "Ukraine never had a tradition of genuine statehood". He incorrectly stated that Vladimir Lenin had created Ukraine by carving a separate Soviet Republic out of what Putin said was Russian land and that Nikita Khrushchev "took Crimea away from Russia for some reason and gave it to Ukraine" in 1954.

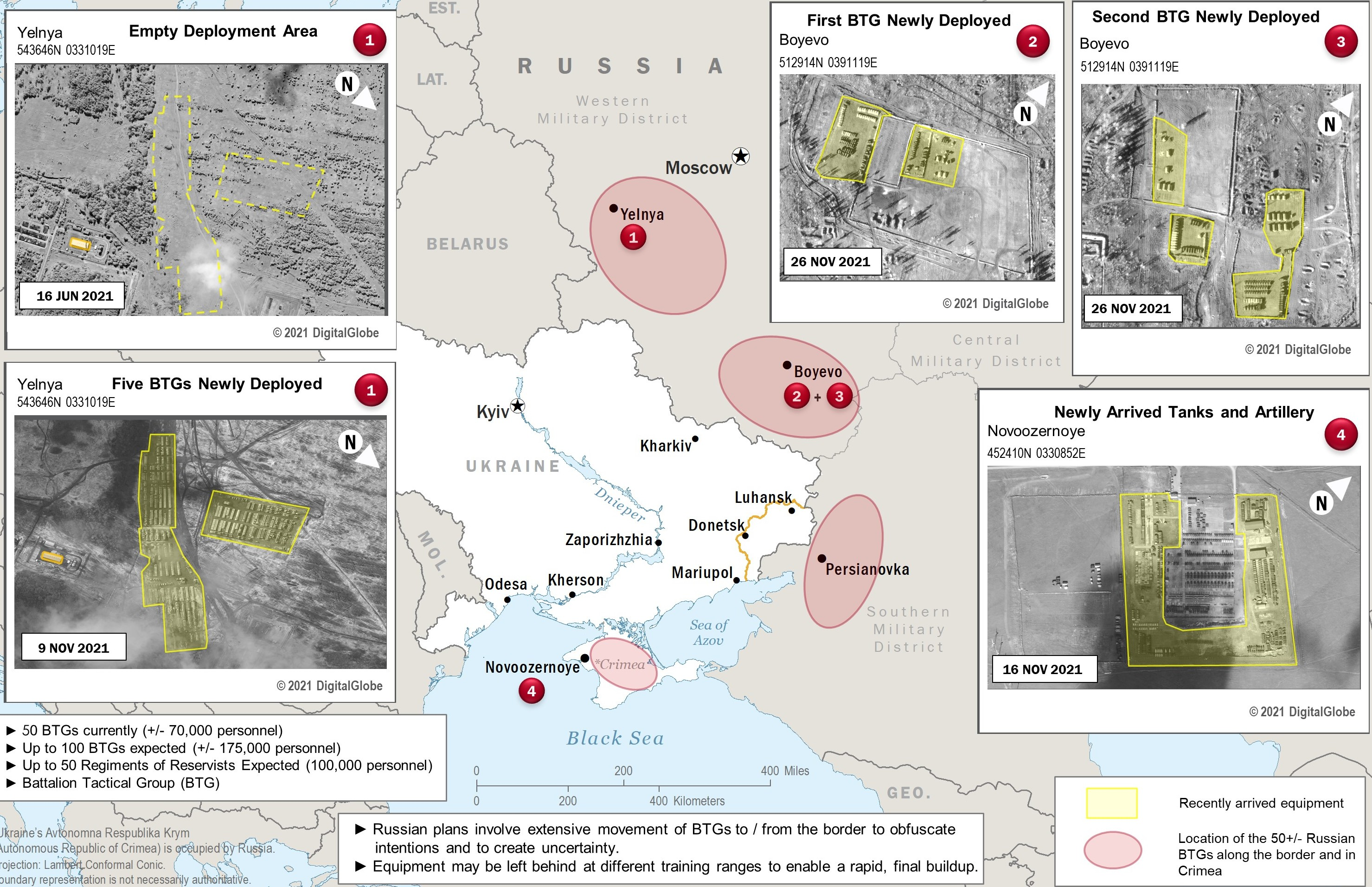
A US intelligence assessment map and imagery on Russian military movement nearby the Ukrainian border, as on 3 December 2021. It assessed that Russia had deployed about 70,000 military personnel mostly about 100–200 kilometres (62–124 mi) from the Ukrainian border, with an assessment this could be increased to 175,000 personnel. Published by The Washington Post.

During the second build-up, the Russian government demanded NATO end all activity in its Eastern European member states and ban Ukraine or any former Soviet state from ever joining NATO, among other demands. A treaty to prevent Ukraine from joining NATO would go against the alliance's "open door" policy and the right of countries to choose their own security, although NATO had made no progress on Ukraine's requests to join. NATO Secretary General Jens Stoltenberg replied that "Russia has no say" on whether Ukraine joins and that "Russia has no right to establish a sphere of influence to try to control their neighbors." NATO offered to improve communication with Russia and discuss limits on missile placements and military exercises, as long as Russia withdrew troops from Ukraine's borders, but Russia did not withdraw.

==== Escalation in the Donbas ====
While Russian troops massed on Ukraine's borders, Russia's proxy forces launched thousands of attacks on Ukrainian troops in the Donbas. Observers from the Organization for Security and Co-operation in Europe (OSCE), which also includes Ukraine and Russia, reported more than 90,000 ceasefire violations throughout 2021; the vast majority were in Russian-controlled territory.

Fighting in Donbas escalated significantly from 17 February 2022 onwards. The Ukrainians and the pro-Russian separatists each accused the other of attacks. There was a sharp increase in artillery shelling by the Russian-led militants in Donbas. Ukraine and its supporters believed this to be an attempt to provoke the Ukrainian army to retaliate, to give Russia a pretext for invading. Ukraine's president Zelenskyy said that his military would not respond to the provocations. Separatist leaders warned that Ukraine was about to launch an offensive but gave no evidence, and The Guardian noted that it would be "exceedingly risky" for Ukraine to assault the Donbas while Russian troops were massed on its borders. On 18 February, the Donetsk and Luhansk people's republics ordered emergency evacuations of civilians, although observers noted that full evacuations would take months. The Russian government intensified its disinformation campaign, with Russian state media airing videos on a nearly hourly basis purporting to show Ukrainian forces attacking Russia. Evidence showed that Russia was staging false flag attacks.

Putin's address to the nation on 21 February (English subtitles available)

On 21 February at 22:35 (UTC+3), Putin announced that the Russian government would diplomatically recognise the Donetsk and Luhansk people's republics. The same evening, Putin directed that Russian troops deploy into Donbas, in what Russia referred to as a "peacekeeping mission". On 22 February, the Federation Council unanimously authorised Putin to use military force outside Russia. In response, Zelenskyy ordered the conscription of army reservists; the following day, Ukraine's parliament proclaimed a 30-day nationwide state of emergency and ordered the mobilisation of all reservists. Russia began to evacuate its embassy in Kyiv.

On the night of 23 February, Zelenskyy gave a speech in Russian in which he appealed to the citizens of Russia to prevent war. He rejected Russia's claims about neo-Nazis and stated that he had no intention of attacking the Donbas.

=== Full-scale Russian invasion of Ukraine (2022) ===
Animated map of Russia's invasion of Ukraine through 5 December 2022 (click to play animation)

Russia began a full-scale invasion of Ukraine on the morning of 24 February 2022 in a major escalation of the war. It began following Putin's announcement of a "special military operation" to "demilitarise and denazify" Ukraine. Minutes later, missiles and airstrikes hit across Ukraine, including Kyiv, shortly followed by a large ground invasion along multiple fronts. Zelenskyy declared martial law and a general mobilisation of all male Ukrainian citizens between 18 and 60, who were banned from leaving the country.

Russian attacks were initially launched on a northern front from Belarus towards Kyiv, a southern front from Crimea, and a south-eastern front from Luhansk and Donetsk and towards Kharkiv. In the northern front, amidst heavy losses and strong Ukrainian resistance surrounding Kyiv, Russia's advance stalled in March, and by April its troops retreated. On 8 April, Russia placed its forces in southern and eastern Ukraine under the command of General Aleksandr Dvornikov, and some units withdrawn from the north were redeployed to the Donbas. On 19 April, Russia launched a renewed attack across a 500 kilometres (300 mi) long front extending from Kharkiv to Donetsk and Luhansk. By 13 May, a Ukraine counter-offensive had driven back Russian forces near Kharkiv. By 20 May, Mariupol fell to Russian troops following a prolonged siege of the Azovstal steel works. Russian forces continued to bomb both military and civilian targets far from the frontline. The war caused the largest refugee and humanitarian crisis within Europe since the Yugoslav Wars in the 1990s; the UN described it as the fastest-growing such crisis since World War II. In the first week of the invasion, the UN reported over a million refugees had fled Ukraine; this subsequently rose to over 7,405,590 by 24 September, a reduction from over eight million due to some refugees' return.

The invasion was internationally condemned as a war of aggression. A United Nations General Assembly resolution demanded a full withdrawal of Russian forces, the International Court of Justice ordered Russia to suspend military operations, and the Council of Europe expelled Russia. Many countries imposed new sanctions, which affected the economies of Russia and the world, and provided humanitarian and military aid to Ukraine. In September 2022, Putin signed a law that would punish anyone who resists conscription with a 10-year prison sentence, resulting in an international push to allow asylum for Russians fleeing conscription.

=== Ukrainian counteroffensives and stalemate (2022–2023) ===
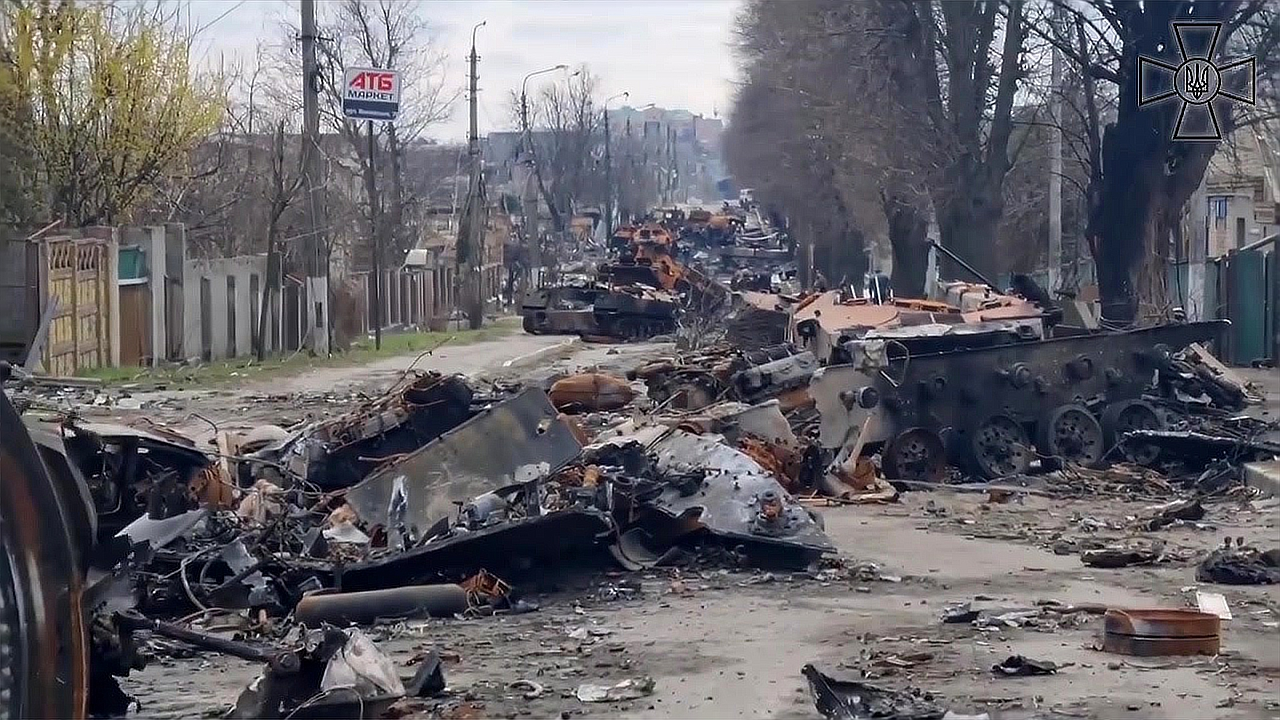
Remnants of a destroyed Russian Army column on 27 February in Bucha

Ukrainian forces launched counteroffensives in the south in August 2022 and in the northeast in September 2022. On 30 September, Russia annexed four oblasts of Ukraine that it had partially conquered during the invasion. This annexation was generally unrecognised and condemned by the countries of the world. After Putin announced that he would begin conscription drawn from the 300,000 citizens with military training and potentially the pool of about 25 million Russians who could be eligible for conscription, one-way tickets out of the country nearly or completely sold out. The Ukrainian offensive in the northeast successfully recaptured the majority of Kharkiv Oblast in September. In the course of the southern counteroffensive, Ukraine retook the city of Kherson in November, and Russian forces withdrew to the east bank of the Dnieper River.

As of August 2023, the total number of Russian and Ukrainian soldiers killed or wounded during the Russian invasion of Ukraine was nearly 500,000. In November 2023, the UN said that more than 10,000 civilians had been killed during the Russian invasion of Ukraine, with about half the deaths in the three months prior to the report taking place far behind the front lines. The UN attributed the deaths far behind the front to Russian use of long-range missiles and explosions of abandoned ordinance. According to a declassified US intelligence assessment, as of December 2023, Russia had lost 315,000 of the 360,000 troops that made up Russia's pre-invasion ground force, and 2,200 of the 3,500 tanks.

=== Russian campaigns and Ukrainian Kursk offensive (2023–present) ===
Between December 2023 and May 2024, Russia was assessed to have increased its drone and missile attacks, firing harder-to-hit weapons, such as ballistic missiles. By the same measure, Ukraine's forces were seen to be low on ammunition, particularly the Patriot systems that have been "its best defense against such attacks."

In August 2024, the Ukrainian Armed Forces launched an incursion into Russia's Kursk Oblast and, as reported by the Ukrainian side, in a few days captured an area of up to 350 square kilometres. By 19 August, Ukraine had captured hundreds of Russian soldiers during the incursion.

In late October 2024, the US said it had seen evidence that North Korea had sent 3,000 soldiers to Russia for possible deployment to Ukraine. On 28 October, NATO chief Mark Rutte confirmed earlier Ukrainian intelligence that North Korean troops had been deployed to Kursk Oblast, and the Pentagon reported an increased number of 10,000 North Korean soldiers sent to train in Russia and fight in the war. On 13 November, both the US and South Korea confirmed that North Korean troops had begun engaging in combat against Ukrainian forces in the Kursk region. On 26 April 2025, Russia officially confirmed the participation of North Korean troops, noting their "significant assistance" to the Russian military in Kursk, which on the same day Russia claimed to have retaken. In July 2026, Zelenskyy replaced Oleksandr Syrskyi with Mykhailo Drapatyi amidst a Ukrainian military leadership crisis and protests demanding the reinstatement of Mykhailo Fedorov as Minister of Defence and the removal of Syrskyi.

== War crimes and human rights violations ==
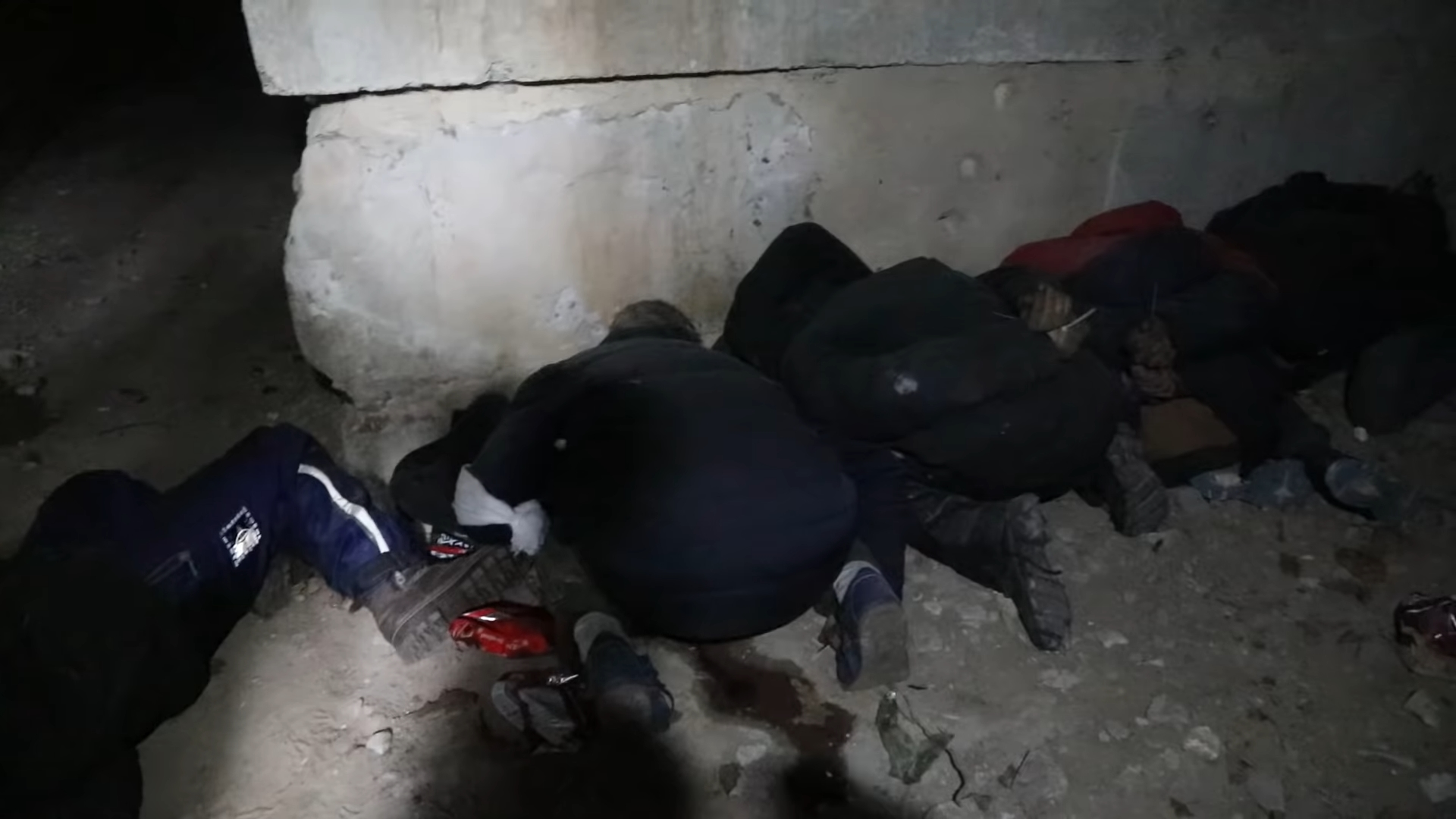
Executed Ukrainian civilians with wrists bound, in a basement in Bucha, 3 April 2022

Violations of human rights and atrocity crimes have occurred during the war. From 2014 to 2021, there were more than 3,000 civilian casualties, with most occurring in 2014 and 2015. The right of movement was impeded for the inhabitants of the conflict zone. In the first years of the conflict, both sides detained people arbitrarily. In government-held areas, that decreased after 2016, while in the separatist-held ones, that continued. Investigations into the abuses committed by both sides made little progress.

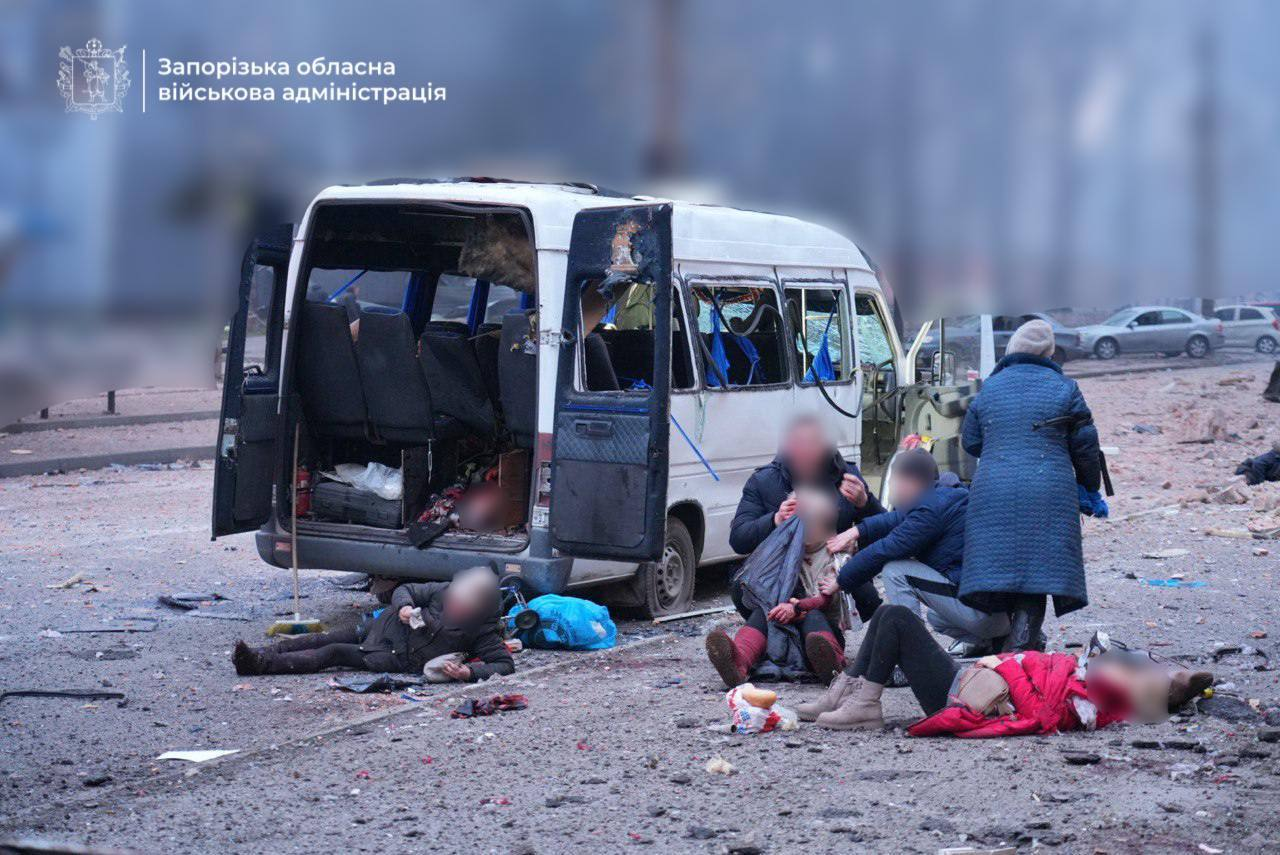
Aftermath of a Russian airstrike on Zaporizhzhia on 8 January 2025, which killed 13 people and wounded many more

Since the beginning of the Russian invasion of Ukraine in 2022, Russian authorities and armed forces have committed multiple war crimes in the form of deliberate attacks against civilian targets, massacres of civilians, torture and rape of women and children, and many indiscriminate attacks in densely populated areas. After the Russian withdrawal from areas north of Kyiv, overwhelming evidence of war crimes by Russian forces was discovered. In particular, in the city of Bucha, evidence emerged of a massacre of civilians perpetrated by Russian troops, including torture, mutilation, rape, looting, and deliberate killings of civilians. The UN Human Rights Monitoring Mission in Ukraine (OHCHR) has documented the murder of at least 73 civilians—mostly men, but also women and children—in Bucha. More than 1,200 bodies of civilians were found in the Kyiv region after Russian forces withdrew, some of them summarily executed. There were reports of forced deportations of thousands of civilians, including children, to Russia, mainly from Russian-occupied Mariupol, as well as sexual violence, including cases of rape, sexual assault, and gang rape, and deliberate killing of Ukrainian civilians by Russian forces. Russia has also systematically attacked Ukrainian medical infrastructure, with the World Health Organization reporting 1,422 attacks as of 21 December 2023. Many Russian soldiers confessed to raping, looting, and torturing Ukrainian civilians and soldiers in intercepted phone calls, which were regularly published online and showcased in a 2024 documentary film, Intercepted.

A 2023 UN backed inquiry found systematic torture and killing in occupied territories as well as in Russia that amounted to war crimes. The report stated a "small number" of violations by Ukrainian forces under investigation, but it maintained the "vast majority" were allegations against Russia.

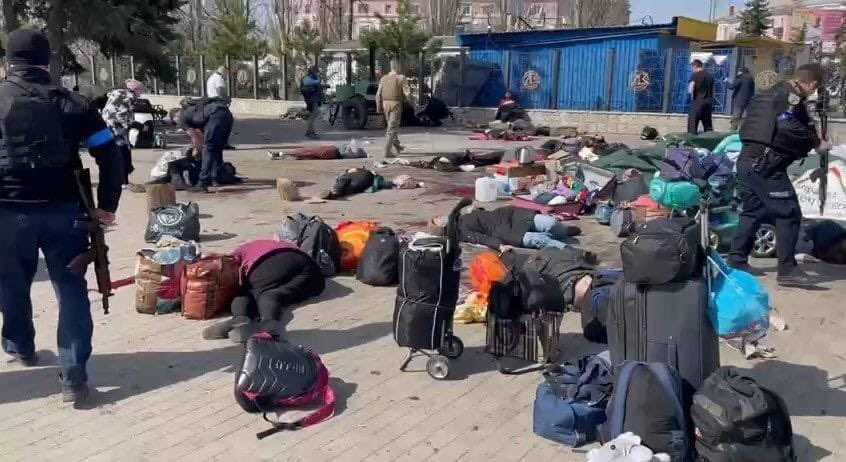
Civilian casualties of the Kramatorsk railway station attack, a Russian missile strike that killed more than 60 people

In 2024, the UN Human Rights Office reported that Russia is committing severe human rights violations in occupied Ukraine, including arbitrary detentions, enforced disappearances, torture, crackdowns on protests and freedom of speech, enforced Russification, indoctrination of children, and suppression of Ukrainian language and culture. Ukrainians have been coerced into taking Russian passports and becoming Russian citizens. Those who refuse are denied healthcare and other rights, and can be imprisoned as a "foreign citizen." Ukrainian men who take Russian citizenship can be drafted to fight against the Ukrainian army. According to Artem Lysohor, Ukraine's head of the Luhansk Regional Military Administration, starting from May 2024, mothers who give birth in Russian-occupied Luhansk must prove that one of the newborn's parents has Russian citizenship; otherwise they will not be allowed to leave the hospital with their child. In addition, Russian occupation officials attempt to militarise and indoctrinate Ukrainian youth by developing a new textbook in accordance with Russian educational standards and children's participation in Russian "military-patriotic games."

In August 2024, UN official Danielle Bell claimed that 95% of Ukrainian prisoners of war had suffered from Russian torture (e.g., beating, electric shock, or being stripped naked).

== Peace and ceasefire proposals ==
Several ceasefire and peace initiatives have been advanced by Ukraine, Russia, and third-party nations such as the United States. Early direct talks in Belarus and Turkey in spring 2022 produced drafts under which Ukraine would adopt permanent neutrality and accept limits on its armed forces in exchange for international security guarantees, a ceasefire, and Russian withdrawal from territories seized after 24 February 2022, with the status of Crimea deferred. These talks collapsed and the dialogue further deteriorated with the Bucha massacre and subsequent Russian territorial claims.

Ukraine's Peace Formula called for complete Russian withdrawal to the 1991 borders, restoration of territorial integrity, security guarantees, and reparations, but was rejected by Moscow. The Black Sea Grain Initiative of July 2022, mediated by Turkey and the United Nations, temporarily enabled Ukrainian grain exports until Russia withdrew in 2023.

In November 2025, U.S. President Trump adopted a 28-point peace plan, interpreted as broadly pro-Russian, and, according to The Insider, at its core, a recycled Russian document substantially written by Kirill Dmitriev, a Kremlin operative. Ukraine, European allies and the US then produced revised versions. These were rejected by the Russians. Russia has favoured the US proposals over EU proposals since 2025. European counter proposals to US drafts have included reductions on military restrictions that would be imposed on Ukraine, and the deletion of a provision that would force Ukraine to enshrine in law that it will not join NATO, along with other changes to wording and specifying Ukraine will receive 'robust Security Guarantees'. Ukraine has repeatedly called for an unconditional ceasefire, which Russia has refused. Ukraine has called for reliable security guarantees in a peace deal and has refused to cede territory as that would violate Ukraine's constitution; Russia has insisted on limits on Ukraine's military, recognition of Russia's territorial gains, and Ukraine surrendering Ukrainian territory that Russia has not militarily conquered.

== Related issues ==
=== Spillover ===
==== NATO territory ====
Since the start of Russia's full-scale invasion in 2022, an increasing number of incidents involving aerial and naval drones as well as missiles, mostly originating from Russia, have taken place inside the territory of non-combatant countries. Inside NATO territory, the first incident took place in March 2022, when a Tupolev Tu-141 drone crashed in Zagreb, Croatia after previously passing through the airspace of Romania and Hungary. The first casualties resulting from such incidents were registered in November 2022 in Poland, when an out of control Ukrainian air-defence missile crashed in the Lublin Voivodeship, killing two people. Another incident that took place in Poland was the 2025 Russian drone incursion, involving over 30 Russian drones, up to 4 of which were shot down for the first time by NATO forces. The same year saw multiple unidentified drone sightings over several European airports. In 2026, homemade quadcopter drones further caused damages on aircraft at the Leipzig Airport. The attacks at Leipzig were linked to Russia and resulted in the closure of the Russian House in Berlin and Russian consulate in Bonn.

Since September 2023, Romania has been the country reporting the most incidents, most of which involved Russian drones or drone fragments crashing near the Romanian border with Ukraine. The number of incidents in Romania significantly increased in 2026, with 35 breaches of its airspace or maritime boundary and 44 incidents of identified drone debris by 17 October, compared to 9 airspace violations and 16 drone debris incidents recorded in 2025.

In May 2026, a Russian Geran-2 drone struck an apartment block in Galați, exploding on impact. Two people were injured and around 70 evacuated as the resulting fire was put out. The Galați incident resulted in the closure of Russia's consulate general from Constanța and Romania's consulate general from Saint Petersburg. In 2026, the first Russian drones also began to be shot down over Romanian territory, at first Geran-2 drones and later jet-powered Geran-4s.

Other drone incidents took place in the Baltic States and Finland. These mostly involved Ukrainian drones which were jammed by Russian electronic warfare while attempting to strike Russian ports on the Baltic Sea. Several Ukrainian drones were shot down by NATO fighters. Incidents involving Russian reconnaissance drones in the area also took place since September 2026.

Sinking of the Khoryv in Romania's EEZ on 23 October 2026

Drones have also affected ships in the Black Sea region. Multiple incidents involving Russian UAVs and USVs striking ships in the exclusive economic zones (EEZ) of Romania and Bulgaria took place in 2026, the first of which inside Romania's maritime border. More than 7 ships have been struck, and more than 3 were sunk within the two nations' maritime boundaries, resulting in multiple dead or missing sailors. By the end of October 2026, the Black Sea became the most dangerous area for shipping, with more sailors lost in a month than in the 2026 Strait of Hormuz crisis.

==== Outside NATO territory ====
Outside of non-combatant NATO territory, Moldova has been the most affected by the airspace violations of drones and cruise missiles. The number of incidents steadily grew from five registered in 2022 to over 15 in 2026.

On 19 September 2023, CNN reported that it was "likely" that Ukrainian Special Operations Forces were behind a series of drone strikes and a ground operation directed against the Wagner-backed RSF near Khartoum on 8 September. Kyrylo Budanov, chief of the Main Directorate of Intelligence of the Ministry of Defense of Ukraine, stated in an interview on 22 September that he could neither deny nor confirm the involvement of Ukraine in the conflict in Sudan, but said that Ukraine would punish Russian war criminals anywhere in the world.

=== Control of natural resources ===
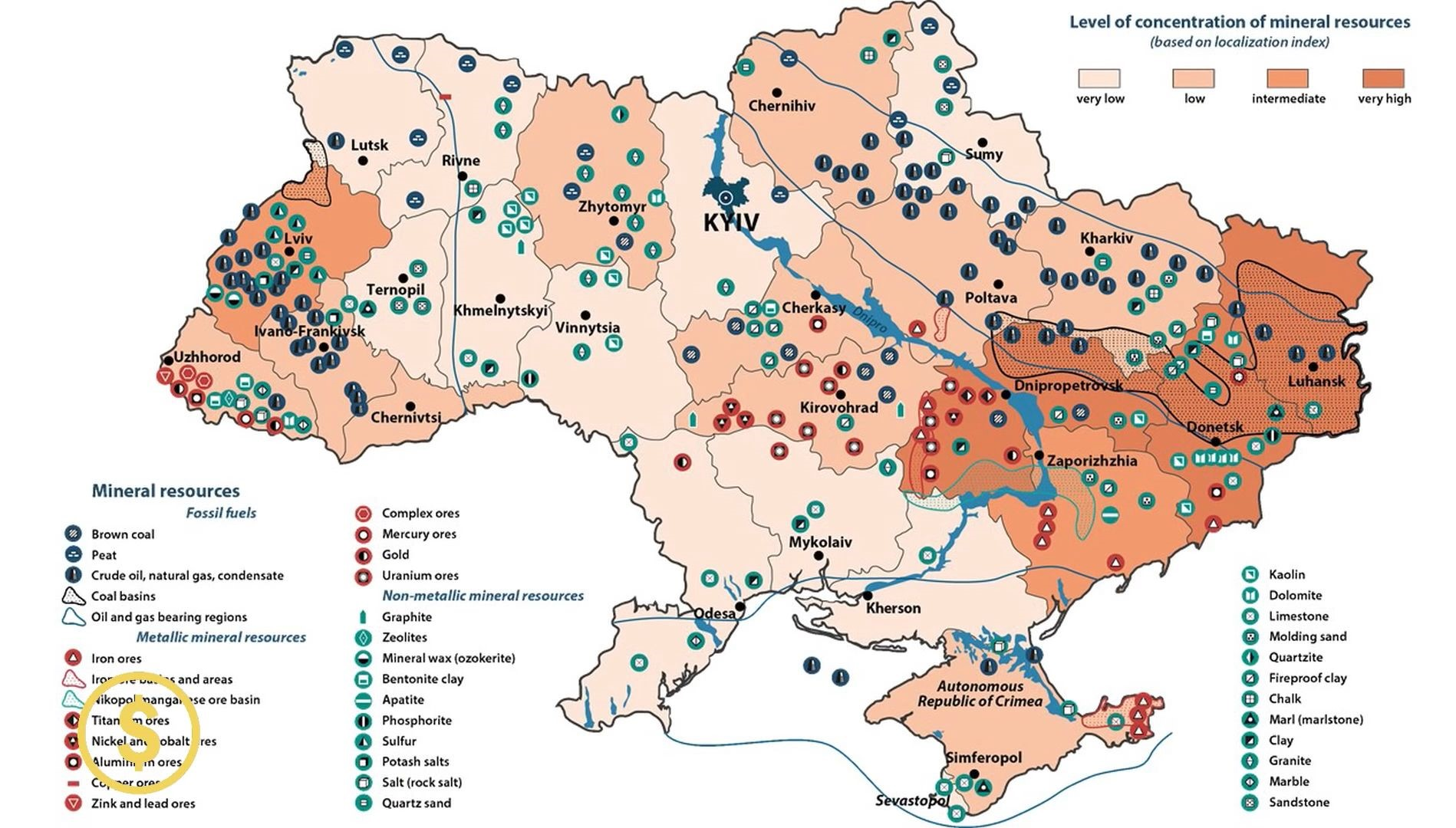
A map of mineral resources, coal basins, oil and gas fields in Ukraine, showing a very high concentration in the east

Control of natural resources was a motive for Russia's annexation of Crimea and southeastern Ukraine. Ukraine holds Europe's second-largest reserves of natural gas, coal, and titanium, and some of the world's largest reserves of iron ore and uranium. It is also thought to hold Europe's largest supply of recoverable rare-earth minerals and one of Europe's largest reserves of lithium. Furthermore, Ukraine is known as the "breadbasket of Europe," being one of the world's biggest suppliers of wheat, corn, and other grains. The total value of national raw material stocks in Ukraine is estimated at over $26 trillion. The value of lithium and rare earths in Ukraine is estimated at $11.5 trillion. Control of Ukrainian lithium and grain would give Russia a "monopoly on the world market."

Ukraine and Europe were heavily dependent on Russian natural gas when the war began. But Ukraine was trying to move towards energy independence by weaning itself off imports of Russian oil and gas, instead developing its own production. Ukraine's gas reserves posed "a potential threat to Russia's stranglehold on that market"; a reason for Russia's annexations may have been to prevent Ukraine from becoming a competitor and to keep Europe dependent on Russian gas.

When Russia seized Crimea in 2014, it also claimed an exclusive economic zone in the Black Sea around the peninsula. This zone is three times bigger than Crimea itself and holds vast natural gas and oil reserves. Ukraine had been trying to develop oil and gas production there. In August 2012, Ukraine's government had granted a consortium (Exxon Mobil, Royal Dutch Shell, OMV Romania, and the Ukrainian state-owned NAK Nadra Ukrainy) rights to extract oil and gas in the Ukrainian part of the Black Sea. The Exxon-led consortium had outbid the Russian company Lukoil. In November 2013, Ukraine signed an agreement with Italian company Eni and French company EDF to extract oil and gas off the Crimean coast, which was forecast to provide Ukraine with up to 3 million tonnes of oil a year. When Russia annexed Crimea, it seized 80% of Ukraine's oil and gas deposits in the Black Sea. Russia also seized billions worth of property from Chornomornaftogaz, the Crimean branch of Ukraine's national gas company, including offshore gas drilling platforms. In the words of Forbes investigative reporter Ariel Cohen, "In one fell swoop, Russia ended Ukraine's offshore oil and gas operations and bolstered its own."

Aside from the Black Sea, the areas with the greatest natural resource wealth are in the eastern Ukrainian provinces that Russia aimed to seize since 2022. About 80% of Ukraine's oil, natural gas, and coal fields are found in the Donbas-Dnipro region. According to a study published in summer 2022 by the Canadian think tank SecDev, Russia took control of energy reserves, metals, and minerals worth at least $12.4 trillion in the Donbas. In 2022, Russian General Vladimir Ovchinsky confirmed that one of the goals of the invasion was to seize Ukrainian lithium deposits. In January 2024, the Russian occupation administration in Donetsk Oblast granted the Russian Ministry of Ecology and Natural Resources a "permission" to mine lithium in the Shevchenko deposit near Kurakhovo, estimated to be worth hundreds of billions of US dollars.

The green transformation or energy transition in Europe is threatening Russia's usual business model: the trade in fossil fuels. A few months before the start of the 2022 Russian invasion, the EU and Ukraine had signed a Green Deal, or a transformation program, for Ukraine, partly because the Ukrainian economy was at the time the most energy-intensive in the world with the most ineffective and expensive thermal power generation. Furthermore, 22 of the 30 raw materials that the EU classified as strategically important are available in large quantities in Ukraine. Russia could only benefit from the energy transition in Europe if it acquired the resources and infrastructure on Ukrainian soil. Europe would then be even more dependent on Russia. If Russia were to achieve its war goals, Russia could steal and gain more than it would lose in reduced exports to Europe.

==== Gas disputes and Nord Stream sabotage ====
Major Russian natural gas pipelines to Europe

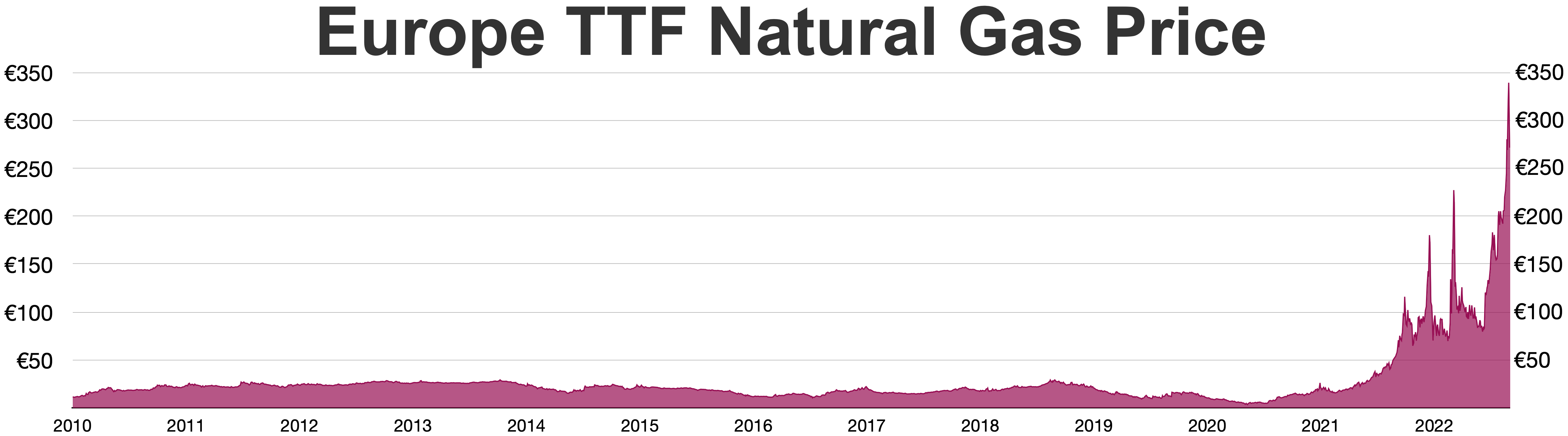
Europe TTF natural gas

Until 2014 Ukraine was the main transit route for Russian natural gas sold to Europe, which earned Ukraine about US$3 billion a year in transit fees, making it the country's most lucrative export service. Following Russia's launch of the Nord Stream pipeline, which bypasses Ukraine, gas transit volumes steadily decreased. Following the start of the Russo-Ukrainian War in February 2014, severe tensions extended to the gas sector. The subsequent outbreak of war in the Donbas region forced the suspension of a project to develop Ukraine's own shale gas reserves at the Yuzivska gas field, which had been planned as a way to reduce Ukrainian dependence on Russian gas imports. Eventually, the EU commissioner for energy Günther Oettinger was called in to broker a deal securing supplies to Ukraine and transit to the EU.

In 2015, Russian state media reported that Russia planned to completely abandon gas supplies to Europe through Ukraine after 2018. Russia's state-owned energy giant Gazprom had already substantially reduced the volumes of gas transited across Ukraine and expressed its intention to reduce the level further by means of transit-diversification pipelines (Turkish Stream, Nord Stream, etc.). Gazprom and Ukraine agreed to a five-year deal on Russian gas transit to Europe at the end of 2019.

In 2020, the TurkStream natural gas pipeline running from Russia to Turkey changed the regional gas flows in South-East Europe by diverting the transit through Ukraine and the Trans Balkan Pipeline system.

In May 2021, the Biden administration waived Trump's CAATSA sanctions on the company behind Russia's Nord Stream 2 gas pipeline to Germany. Ukrainian president Zelenskyy said he was "surprised" and "disappointed" by Joe Biden's decision. In July 2021, the U.S. urged Ukraine not to criticise a forthcoming agreement with Germany over the pipeline.

In July 2021, Biden and German Chancellor Angela Merkel concluded a deal that the U.S. might trigger sanctions if Russia used Nord Stream as a "political weapon." The deal aimed to prevent Poland and Ukraine from being cut off from Russian gas supplies. Ukraine will get a $50 million loan for green technology until 2024, and Germany will set up a billion dollar fund to promote Ukraine's transition to green energy to compensate for the loss of the gas-transit fees. The contract for transiting Russian gas through Ukraine will be prolonged until 2034, if the Russian government agrees.

In August 2021, Zelenskyy warned that the Nord Stream 2 natural gas pipeline between Russia and Germany was "a dangerous weapon, not only for Ukraine but for the whole of Europe." In September 2021, Ukraine's Naftogaz CEO Yuriy Vitrenko accused Russia of using natural gas as a "geopolitical weapon." According to Vitrenko, a joint statement from the United States and Germany said that if the Kremlin used gas as a weapon, there would be an appropriate response. According to Vitrenko, they were awaiting the imposition of sanctions on a 100% subsidiary of Gazprom, this being the operator of Nord Stream 2.

On 7 February 2022, at a joint conference with German Chancellor Olaf Scholz, Biden said that if Russia invades Ukraine, the US would bring an end to Nordstream 2.

On 26 September 2022, a series of underwater explosions and consequent gas leaks occurred on the Nord Stream 1 (NS1) and Nord Stream 2 (NS2) natural gas pipelines. The investigations by Sweden and Denmark described the explosions as sabotage, and were closed without identifying perpetrators in February 2024. The German government refused to publish the preliminary results of its own investigation in July 2024.

=== Hybrid warfare ===
The Russo-Ukrainian conflict has also included elements of hybrid warfare using non-traditional means. Cyberwarfare has been used by Russia in operations including successful attacks on the Ukrainian power grid in December 2015 and in December 2016, which was the first successful cyber attack on a power grid, and the Mass hacker supply-chain attack in June 2017, which the US claimed was the largest known cyber attack. In retaliation, Ukrainian operations have included the Surkov leaks in October 2016, which released 2,337 e-mails in relation to Russian plans for seizing Crimea from Ukraine and fomenting separatist unrest in Donbas. The Russian information war against Ukraine is another front in the hybrid war waged by Russia.

A Russian fifth column in Ukraine has also been claimed to exist among the Party of Regions, the Communist Party, the Progressive Socialist Party, and the Russian Orthodox Church.

=== Russian propaganda and disinformation campaigns ===
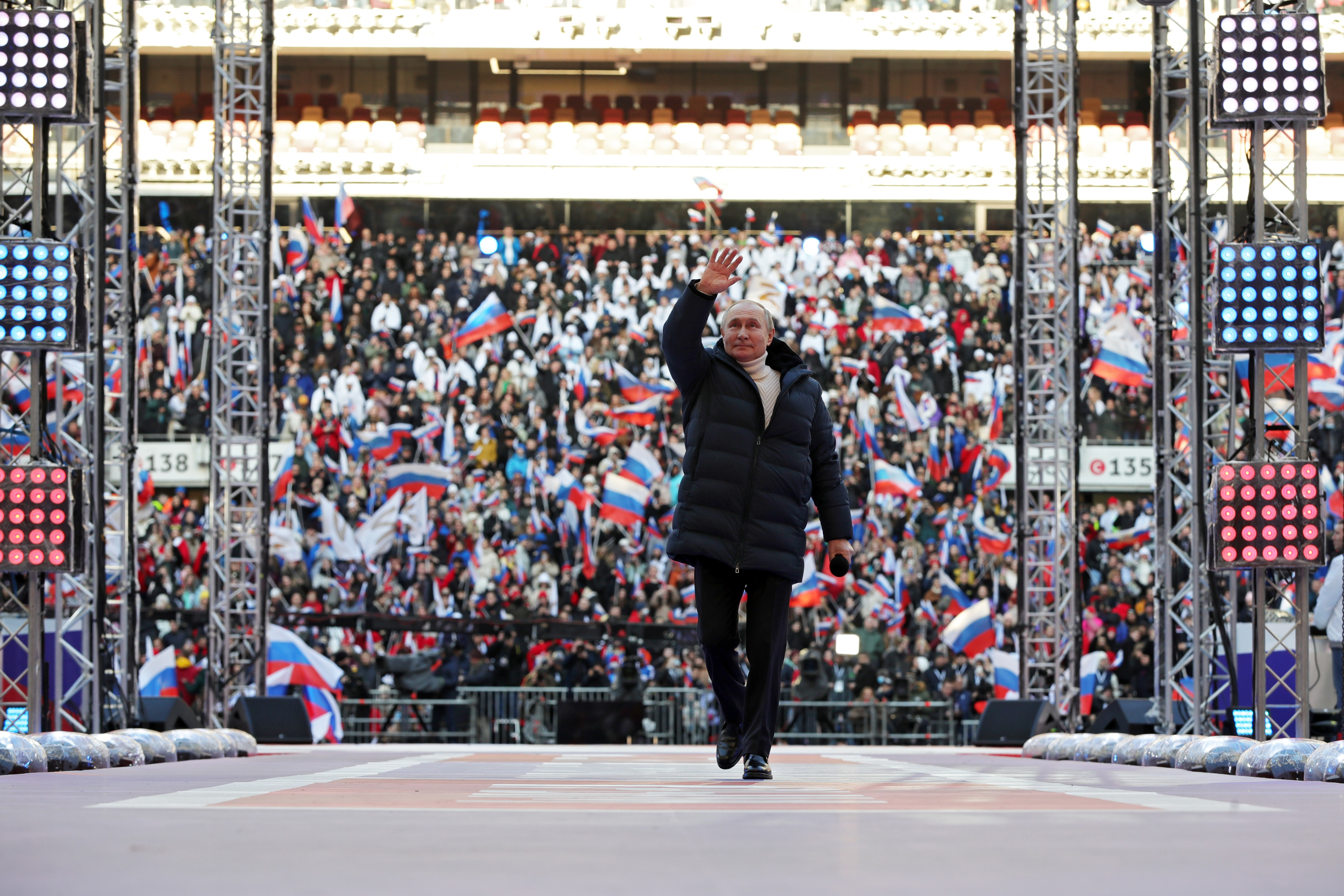
Moscow rally of 18 March 2022, officially known in Russia as a rally "For a world without Nazism"

The Russian state falsely claims that Ukraine's government and society are dominated by neo-Nazism, invoking the history of collaboration in German-occupied Ukraine during World War II. These Nazi allegations are widely rejected as untrue and part of a disinformation campaign to justify the invasion. Some of the world's leading historians of Nazism and the Holocaust put out a statement rejecting the claims, which was signed by hundreds of other historians and scholars of the subject. It says:

We strongly reject the Russian government's ... equation of the Ukrainian state with the Nazi regime to justify its unprovoked aggression. This rhetoric is factually wrong, morally repugnant and deeply offensive to the memory of millions of victims of Nazism and those who courageously fought against it.

Ukraine has a far-right fringe like most countries, including the Azov Movement and Right Sector, but analysts say that Russia's government and mainstream media greatly exaggerate its size and influence. Ukraine's president, Zelenskyy, is Jewish; his grandfather served in the Soviet army fighting against the Nazis; and three of his ancestors were killed in the Holocaust. In an attempt to drum up support for the war among its citizens, Russian propaganda has framed it as a continuation of the Soviet Union's "Great Patriotic War" against Nazi Germany. Some commentators point out that Russia claims to be "denazifying" Ukraine despite Russian neo-Nazi groups (such as Rusich) taking part in the war and despite Putin's Russia being likened to a fascist state (see Ruscism).

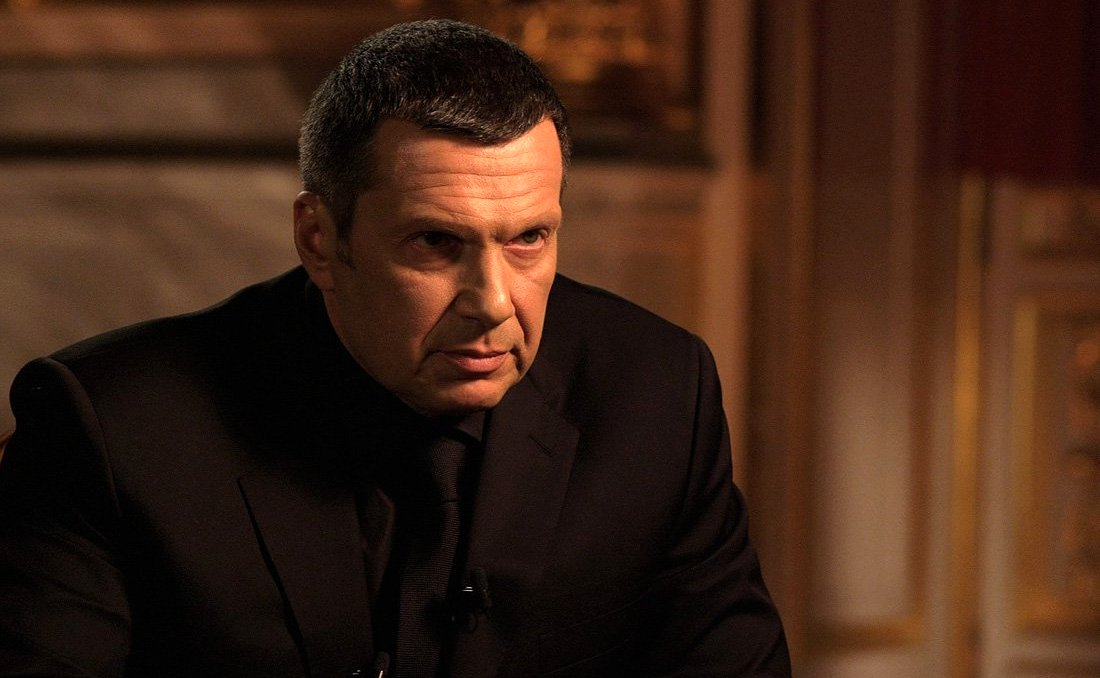
Pro-Kremlin TV and radio host Vladimir Solovyov voiced support for his country's invasion of Ukraine.

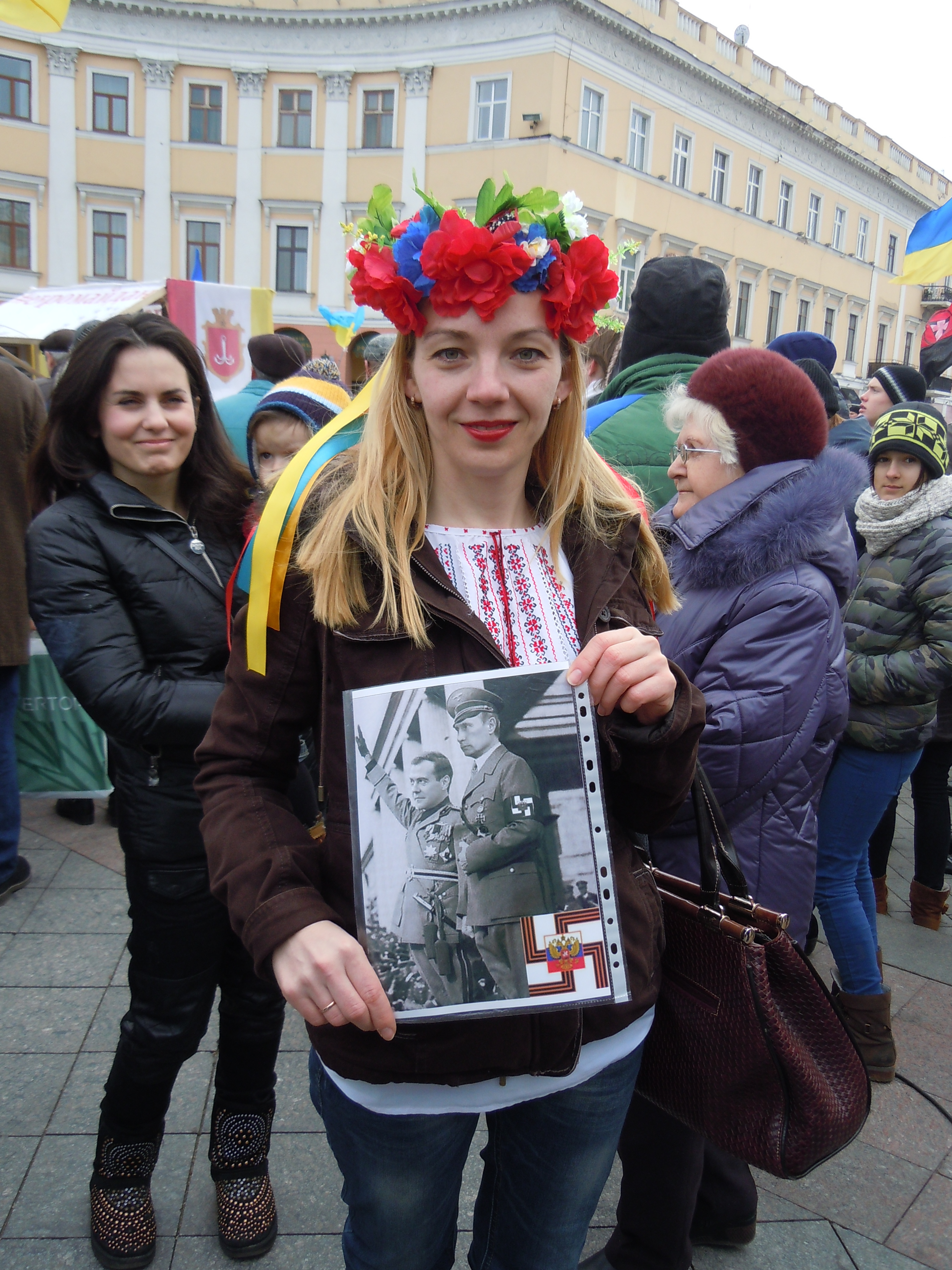
Ukrainian protester with a poster portraying Russian presidents (Putin and Medvedev) as Nazis in 2014

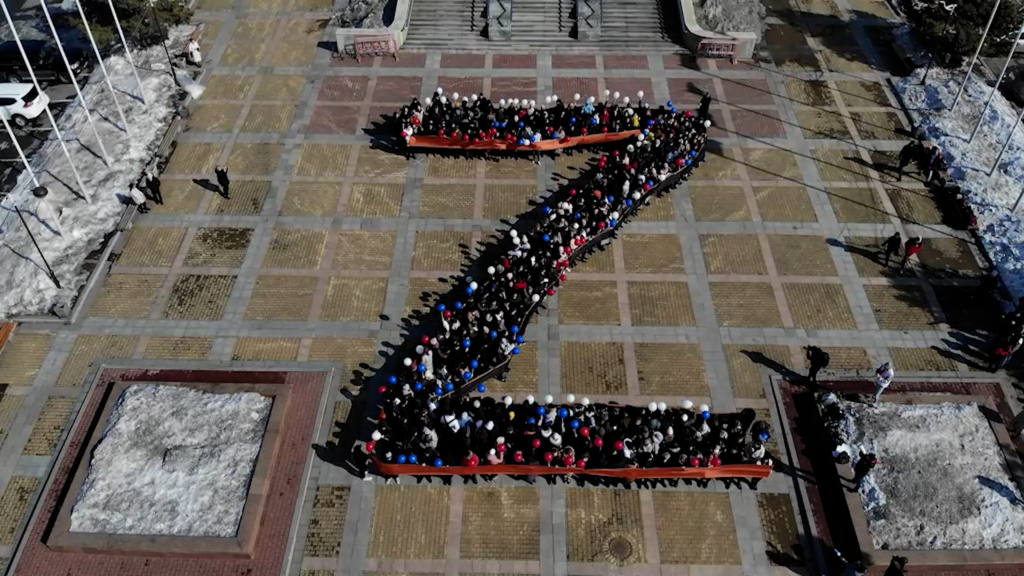
Z symbol flash mob in Khabarovsk

Putin called Russians and Ukrainians "one people" and claimed there is "no historical basis" for the "idea of Ukrainian people as a nation separate from the Russians." Putin repeatedly denied Ukraine's right to exist, claiming that it was created by the Russian Bolsheviks and that it never had "real statehood." A poll conducted in April 2022 by "Rating" found that the vast majority (91%) of Ukrainians do not support the thesis that "Russians and Ukrainians are one people." In 2020, Vladislav Surkov, who served as an adviser to Putin on Ukraine said, "There is no Ukraine. There is Ukrainianism ... it is a specific disorder of the mind." Dmitry Medvedev, deputy chairman of the Security Council of Russia and former Russian president, publicly wrote that "Ukraine is NOT a country, but artificially collected territories" and that Ukrainian "is NOT a language" but a "mongrel dialect" of Russian. In 2024, Medvedev called Ukraine part of Russia and said the Russian Army will seize what he called the "Russian cities" of Kyiv and Odesa. Medvedev has also said that Ukraine should not exist in any form and that Russia will continue to wage war against any independent Ukrainian state. Moreover, Medvedev warned that Russia would use a nuclear weapon if the 2023 Ukrainian counteroffensive succeeded. He said Ukrainians had to choose between joining Russia or "death."

Fake stories have been used to provoke public outrage against Ukraine. In April 2014, a Russian news channel showed a man saying he was attacked by a fascist Ukrainian gang, while another channel showed the same man claiming to be a Ukrainian funding far-right anti-Russia radicals. A third segment portrayed the man as a neo-Nazi surgeon. In July 2014, Channel One Russia broadcast a fake story about a 3-year-old Russian boy who was allegedly crucified by Ukrainian nationalists. Russian state media reported mass graves full of ethnic Russians in eastern Ukraine. Amnesty International investigated these claims in 2014 and instead found isolated incidents of extrajudicial executions by both sides. Russian state news outlets have sometimes aired stories about alleged Ukrainian atrocities using footage from other unrelated conflicts.

In announcing the 2022 invasion, Putin baselessly claimed that Ukraine had been carrying out genocide in the mainly Russian-speaking Donbas region for eight years. Ukraine brought a case before the International Court of Justice (ICJ) to challenge Russia's claim. The ICJ said it had not seen any evidence of genocide by Ukraine. Altogether, about 14,300 people were killed by both sides in the Donbas War. According to the United Nations High Commissioner for Human Rights, less than a quarter of them were civilians, and at least half of those were killed by mines and unexploded ordnance.

The Russian censorship apparatus Roskomnadzor ordered the country's media to use information only from Russian state sources or else face fines and blocks and ordered media and schools to describe the war as a "special military operation." On 4 March 2022, Putin signed into law a bill introducing prison sentences of up to 15 years for those who publish "fake news" about the Russian military and its operations, leading some media outlets to stop reporting on Ukraine. Russia's opposition politician Alexei Navalny said the "monstrosity of lies" in the Russian state media "is unimaginable. And, unfortunately, so is its persuasiveness for those who have no access to alternative information." He tweeted that "warmongers" among Russian state media personalities "should be treated as war criminals. From the editors-in-chief to the talk show hosts to the news editors, [they] should be sanctioned now and tried someday."

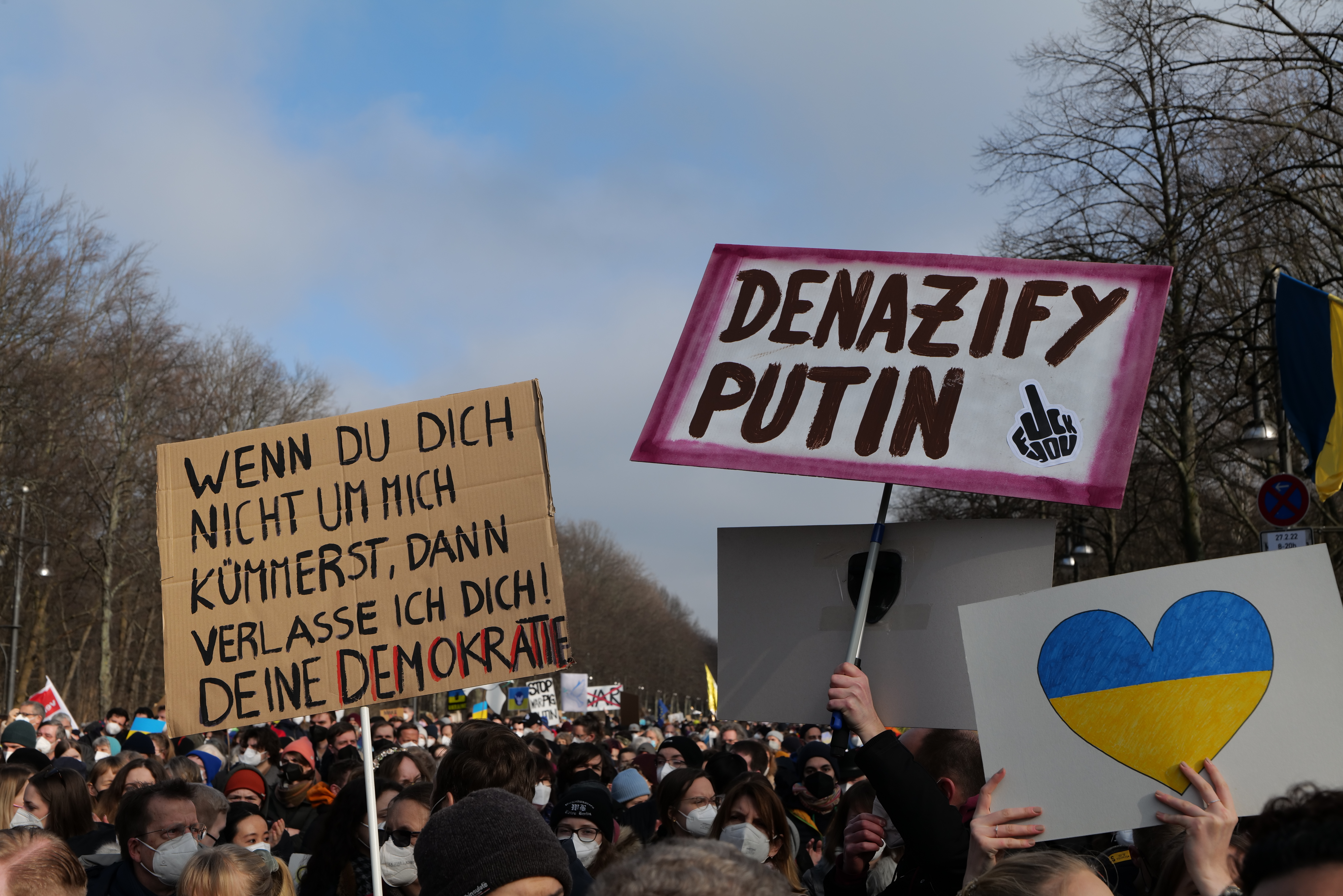
Pro-Ukrainian rally in Berlin, one of the signs saying "Denazify Putin"

The Islamic State claimed responsibility for the 22 March Crocus City Hall attack, a terrorist attack in a music venue in Krasnogorsk, Moscow Oblast, Russia, and published a corroborating video. Putin and the Russian security service, the FSB, blamed Ukraine for the attack, without evidence. On 3 April 2024, Russia's Defense Ministry announced that "around 16,000 citizens" had signed military contracts in the last 10 days to fight as contract soldiers in the war against Ukraine, with most of them saying they were motivated to "avenge those killed" in the Crocus City Hall attack.

NAFO (North Atlantic Fella Organization), a loose cadre of online shitposters vowing to fight Russian disinformation, gained notoriety after June 2022.

In June 2025, despite months of peace negotiations during the Russian invasion of Ukraine, Putin declared that "I consider the Russian and Ukrainian people to be one nation. In this sense, all of Ukraine is ours" and continued threatening to use nuclear weapons on Ukraine.

=== Role of the Russian Orthodox Church in Ukraine ===
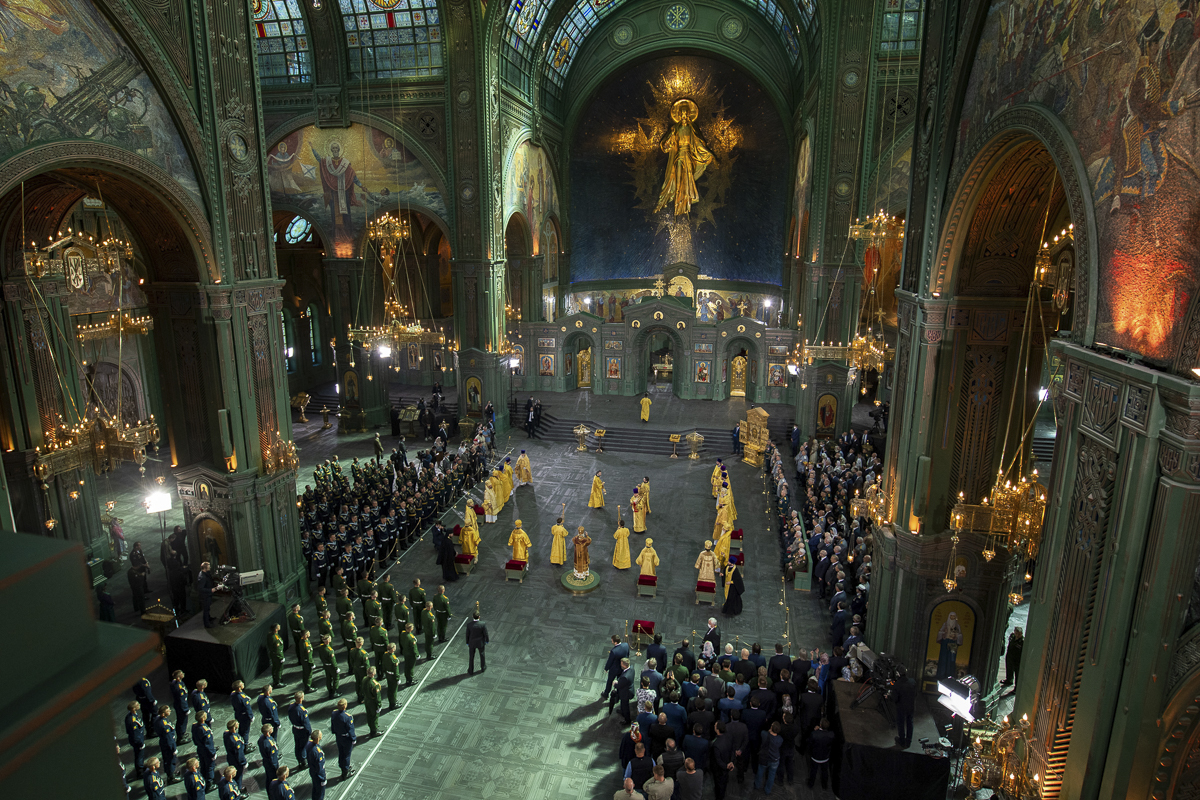
The 2020 consecration ceremony of the Main Cathedral of the Russian Armed Forces, which previously had a mosaic depicting the 2014 annexation of Crimea and featured Putin and Shoigu, but it was later removed

The Russian Orthodox Church (Moscow Patriarchate) and its hierarch Patriarch Kirill of Moscow have shown their full support of the war against Ukraine. The Russian Orthodox Church officially deems the invasion of Ukraine to be a "holy war." During the World Russian People's Council in March 2024, the Russian Orthodox Church approved a document stating that this "holy war" was to defend "Holy Russia" and to protect the world from globalism and the West, which it said had "fallen into Satanism." The document further stated that all of Ukraine should come under Russia's sphere of influence and that Ukrainians and Belarusians "should be recognised only as sub-ethnic groups of the Russians." Not one of the approximately 400 Russian Orthodox Church bishops in Russia has spoken out against the war. Patriarch Kirill also issued a prayer for victory in the war. Russian Orthodox priests who condemned or did not support the invasion were punished.

The role of the Russian Orthodox Church in advancing Putin's war messaging is a vivid illustration of the complex interplay between religion and politics. A Russia expert and fellow of Germany's University of Bremen told Al Jazeera that the ROC's participation in the war means it "faces the prospect of losing its 'universal character' and clout and of reducing its borders to those of [Russian President Vladimir] Putin's political empire."

On 27 March 2024 the World Russian People's Council took place in the Cathedral of Christ the Saviour in Moscow where was adopted a "Nakaz" (decree) of the council "The Present and the Future of the Russian World". According to some experts, such as the ROC protodeacon Andrei Kurayev, it has similarities with the program articles of the German Christians. The decree talks about the so-called "Special Military Operation" in Ukraine, the development of the Russian World globally and other issues.

=== Russia–NATO relations ===
European NATO and CSTO member states on the eve of the 2022 Russian invasion of Ukraine. CSTO NATO member states in 2022 States affected by Russian occupation Russian-occupied territories

The conflict has harmed relations between Russia and the North Atlantic Treaty Organization (NATO), a defensive alliance of European and North American states. Russia and NATO had co-operated until Russia annexed Crimea and invaded the Donbas in 2014. Some analysts and politicians perceive it to be the beginning of a Second Cold War. Because of Russian military aggression, Ukraine's parliament voted to end the country's neutral status in December 2014 and later resumed its bid for eventual NATO membership. To deter further Russian aggression, a small NATO tripwire force was deployed in the Baltic states and Poland for the first time ever, at the request of those countries. A few NATO members began training Ukraine's military of their own accord.

In his February 2022 speeches justifying the invasion of Ukraine, Putin falsely claimed that NATO was building up military infrastructure in Ukraine and threatening Russia and that the Ukrainian military was under NATO control. Putin said that Ukraine's potential membership of NATO would be a threat, warning that NATO would use Ukraine to launch a surprise attack on Russia. Political scientists Michael McFaul and Robert Person said Russia's occupation of Crimea and the Donbas since 2014 had already blocked Ukraine's NATO membership, suggesting that Putin was using NATO as an excuse. Russian Foreign Minister Sergey Lavrov characterised the conflict as a proxy war started by NATO.

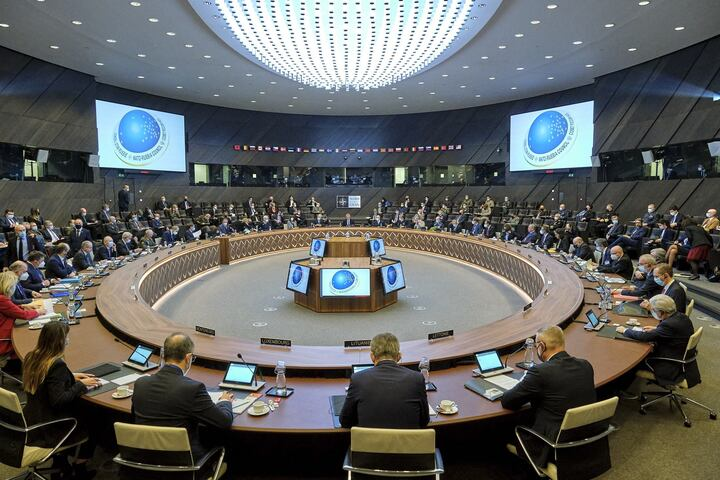
The NATO-Russia Council meets in January 2022 to discuss the 2021–2022 Russo-Ukrainian crisis

NATO says it is not at war with Russia, but rather its members support Ukraine in "its right to self-defense, as enshrined in the UN Charter." NATO condemned Russia's 2022 invasion of Ukraine in "the strongest possible terms" and called it "the biggest security threat in a generation." It led to the deployment of additional NATO units in its eastern member states. Former CIA director Leon Panetta told the ABC that the U.S. is 'without question' involved in a proxy war with Russia. Lawrence Freedman wrote that calling Ukraine a NATO "proxy" wrongly implied that "Ukrainians are only fighting because NATO put them up to it, rather than because of the more obvious reason that they have been subjected to a vicious invasion."

Steven Pifer argues that Russia's own aggressive actions since 2014 have done the most to push Ukraine towards the West and NATO. Russia's invasion led Finland to join NATO, doubling the length of Russia's border with NATO. Putin said that Finland's membership was not a threat, unlike Ukraine's, "but the expansion of military infrastructure into this territory would certainly provoke our response". An article published by the Institute for the Study of War concluded:

Putin didn't invade Ukraine in 2022 because he feared NATO. He invaded because he believed that NATO was weak, that his efforts to regain control of Ukraine by other means had failed, and that installing a pro-Russian government in Kyiv would be safe and easy. His aim was not to defend Russia against some non-existent threat but rather to expand Russia's power, eradicate Ukraine's statehood, and destroy NATO.

Countering claims that NATO started and is waging a proxy war against Russia, it is pointed out that NATO states only sent Ukraine military aid in response to Russian aggression. NATO states have actually been slow in sending Ukraine offensive weaponry, and they prevented Ukraine from firing those weapons into Russia. It was not until May 2024, more than two years into the invasion, that NATO states allowed Ukraine to fire Western-supplied weapons at military targets inside Russia, and only then in self-defence. NATO has refused Ukrainian calls to enforce a no-fly zone over Ukraine, and the US told Ukraine to stop attacking refineries and early-warning radars in Russia.

Since the invasion of Ukraine, there has been an increase in Russian hybrid warfare against NATO and countries in Europe. This hybrid warfare is aimed at destabilizing the alliance and disrupting support to Ukraine. This has included Russian sabotage operations in Europe, assassination plots, airspace violations, cyberattacks, electronic warfare, and disinformation operations.

=== Russian military bases in Crimea ===
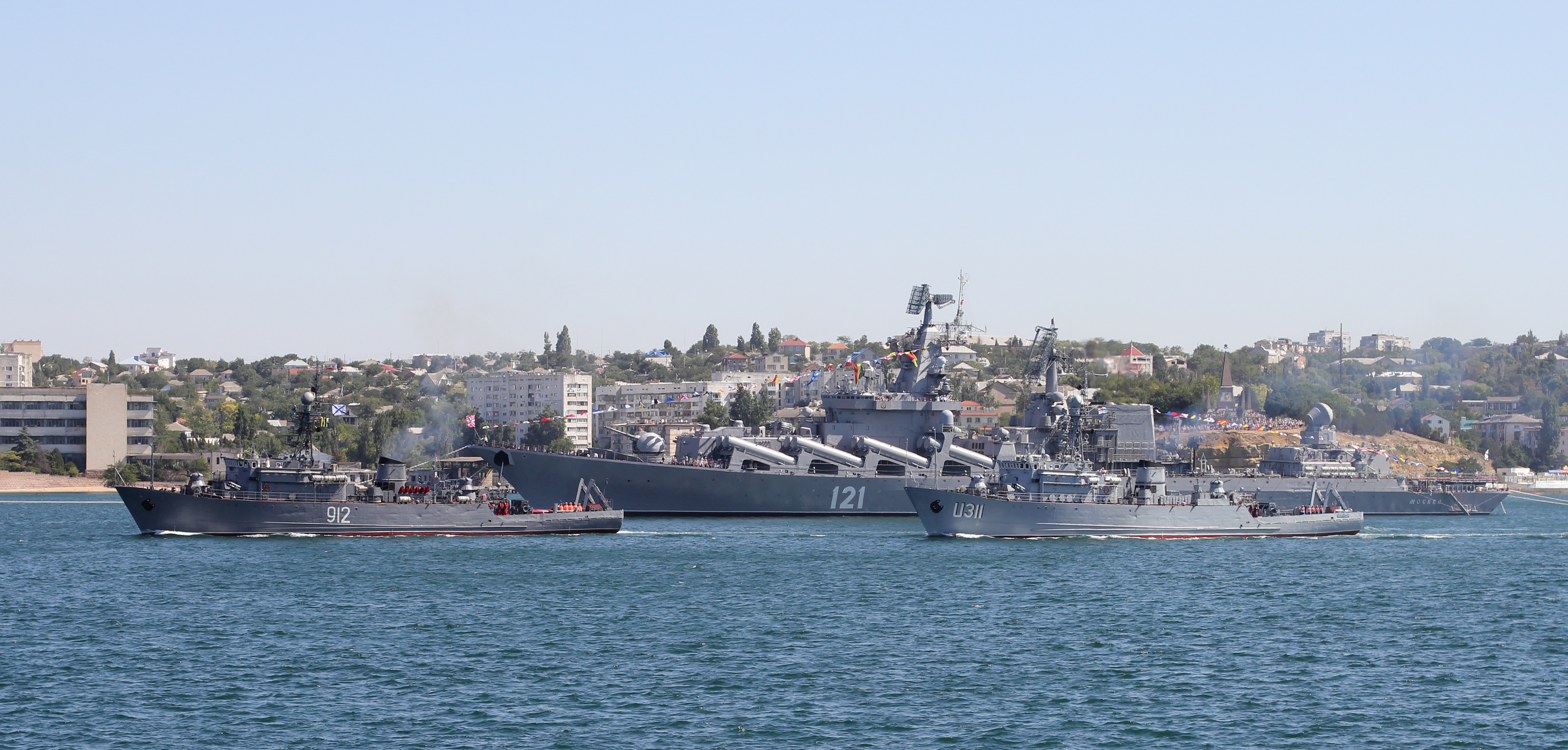
Russian cruiser Moskva (centre) at Sevastopol Bay in 2012

When the Russian occupation of Crimea began, Russia had roughly 12,000 military personnel from the Black Sea Fleet, in several locations in the Crimean peninsula such as Sevastopol, Kacha, Hvardiiske, Simferopol Raion, Sarych, and others. In 2005 a dispute broke out between Russia and Ukraine over control of the Sarych Cape lighthouse near Yalta and a number of other beacons. The basing and transit agreement with Ukraine allowed the presence there of a maximum of 25,000 Russian troops. Russia was required to respect the sovereignty of Ukraine, honour its legislation, not interfere in the internal affairs of the country, and show their "military identification cards" when crossing the international border. Early in the conflict, the agreement's generous troop limit allowed Russia to significantly strengthen its military presence and deploy special forces and other required capabilities to conduct the operation in Crimea under the pretext of addressing security concerns.

According to the original treaty on the division of the Soviet Black Sea Fleet signed in 1997, Russia was allowed to have its military bases in Crimea until 2017, after which it would evacuate all military units, including its portion of the Black Sea Fleet, from the Autonomous Republic of Crimea and Sevastopol. On 21 April 2010, former Ukrainian president Viktor Yanukovych signed a new deal with Russia, known as the Kharkiv Pact, to resolve the 2009 Russia–Ukraine gas dispute. The pact extended Russia's stay in Crimea to 2042, with an option to renew.

=== Non-state actors and mercenaries ===
On 4 August 2025, Ukrainian President Volodymyr Zelenskyy alleged that foreign mercenaries, including individuals from Pakistan and China, were fighting alongside Russian forces in northeastern Ukraine. During a visit to the frontline in the Kharkiv region, President Zelenskyy stated, "Our warriors in this sector are reporting the participation of mercenaries from China, Tajikistan, Uzbekistan, Pakistan, and African countries in the war. We will respond." He had previously accused Moscow of recruiting Chinese fighters for its war effort, a claim that Beijing denied.

=== Third-party arms suppliers ===
==== Iran ====
The Islamic Republic of Iran has supplied Russia with a large number of unmanned aerial vehicles, most notably the Shahed drones. By the second year of the war, Russia was domestically producing modified versions of Iran's Shahed drones.

==== North Korea ====
Initial reports that the Democratic People's Republic of Korea was supplying arms and ammunition to Russia were revealed by the White House National Security Council in 2022. Deals expanded the following year, with Russia supplying food and economic assistance in exchange for more weaponry and munitions. North Korea–Russia relations expanded significantly throughout the war, with both countries signing a mutual defense treaty, which saw North Korean soldiers being deployed and used to recapture Russia's Kursk Oblast.

==== China ====
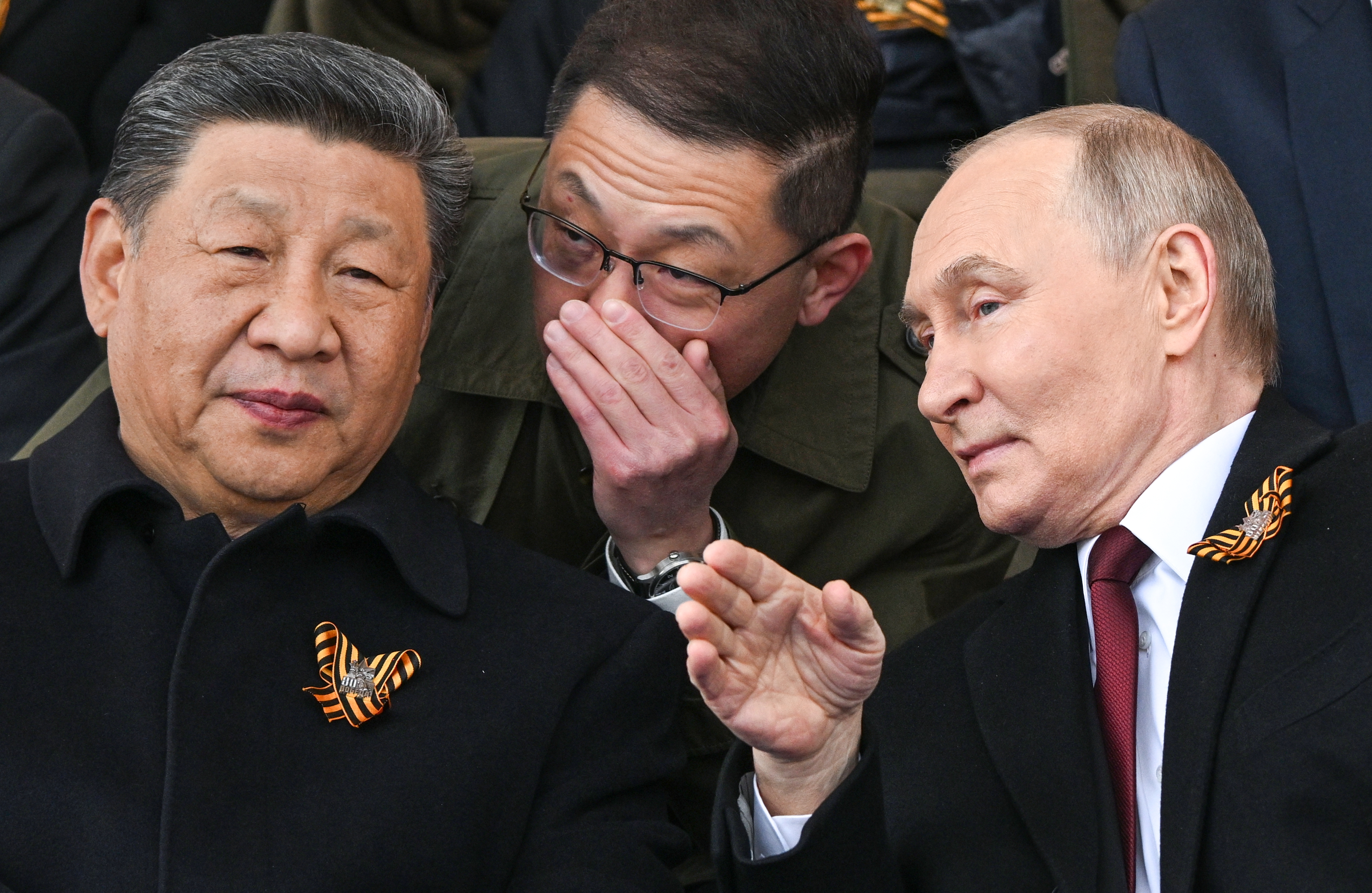
Putin and Chinese president Xi Jinping in Moscow in May 2025

Samuel Bendett, an adjunct senior fellow at the Center for a New American Security, stated that China has become a key contributor to Russia's military supply chain.

Both Russia and Ukraine rely on Chinese exports for large parts of their drone manufacturing and supply systems.

According to reporting by Reuters based on European security officials and documents reviewed by the agency, teams of Chinese drone engineers and technicians visited the Russian state-owned arms manufacturer IEMZ Kupol on multiple occasions from mid‑2024 into 2025 to conduct flight tests, assembly, and technical development work on a range of unmanned aerial systems; the documents and invoices cited shipments of Chinese-made one‑way attack and surveillance drones, including models supplied by Sichuan AEE and Hunan Haotianyi, to Kupol via the sanctioned Russian intermediary TSK Vektor and described collaborative activities such as adapting Chinese flight‑control computers and engines for the domestically produced Garpiya series, installing anti‑jamming equipment, and conducting test flights at a Russian military range.

=== Legality and declaration of war ===
Territorial control in Ukraine and nearby areas of Russia as of July 2025

No formal declaration of war has been issued in the ongoing Russo-Ukrainian War. When Putin announced the Russian invasion of Ukraine, he claimed to commence a "special military operation," sidestepping a formal declaration of war. The statement was, however, regarded by the Ukrainian government as a declaration of war and reported as such by many international news sources. While the Ukrainian parliament refers to Russia as a "terrorist state" in regard to its military actions in Ukraine, it has not issued a formal declaration of war on its behalf.

The Russian invasion of Ukraine violated international law (including the Charter of the United Nations). (Note: Attributed to multiple references:) The invasion has also been called a crime of aggression under international criminal law and under some countries' domestic criminal codes—including those of Ukraine and Russia—although procedural obstacles exist to prosecutions under these laws.

== Reactions ==
=== Reactions to the Russian annexation of Crimea ===
==== Ukrainian response ====
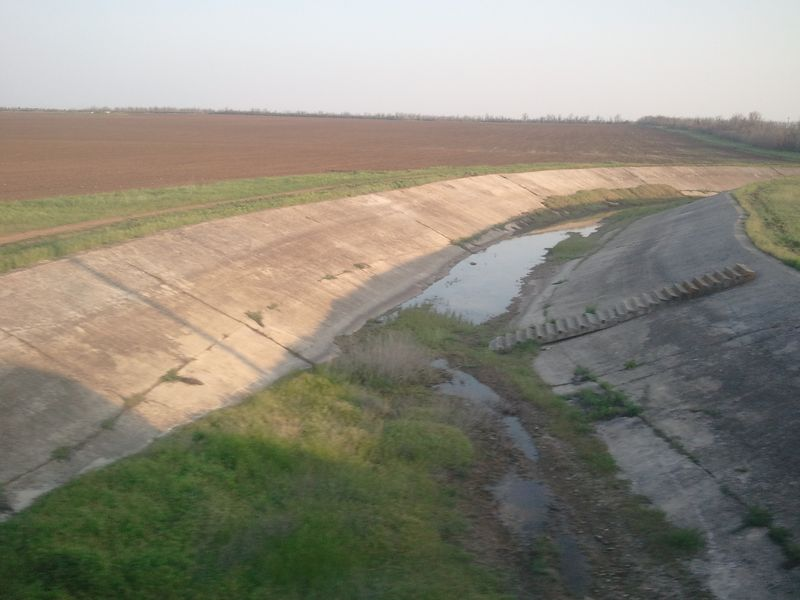
Following Russia's annexation of Crimea, Ukraine blocked the North Crimean Canal, which provided 85% of Crimea's drinking and irrigation water.

Interim Ukrainian president Oleksandr Turchynov accused Russia of "provoking a conflict" by backing the seizure of the Crimean parliament building and other government offices on the Crimean peninsula. He compared Russia's military actions to the 2008 Russo-Georgian War, when Russian troops occupied parts of the Republic of Georgia and the breakaway enclaves of Abkhazia and South Ossetia were established under the control of Russian-backed administrations. He called on Putin to withdraw Russian troops from Crimea and stated that Ukraine will "preserve its territory" and "defend its independence." On 1 March, he warned, "Military intervention would be the beginning of war and the end of any relations between Ukraine and Russia." On 1 March, acting president Oleksandr Turchynov placed the Armed Forces of Ukraine on full alert and combat readiness.

The Ministry of Temporarily Occupied Territories and IDPs was established by the Ukrainian government on 20 April 2016 to manage occupied parts of the Donetsk, Luhansk and Crimea regions affected by the Russian military intervention of 2014.

==== NATO and United States military response ====
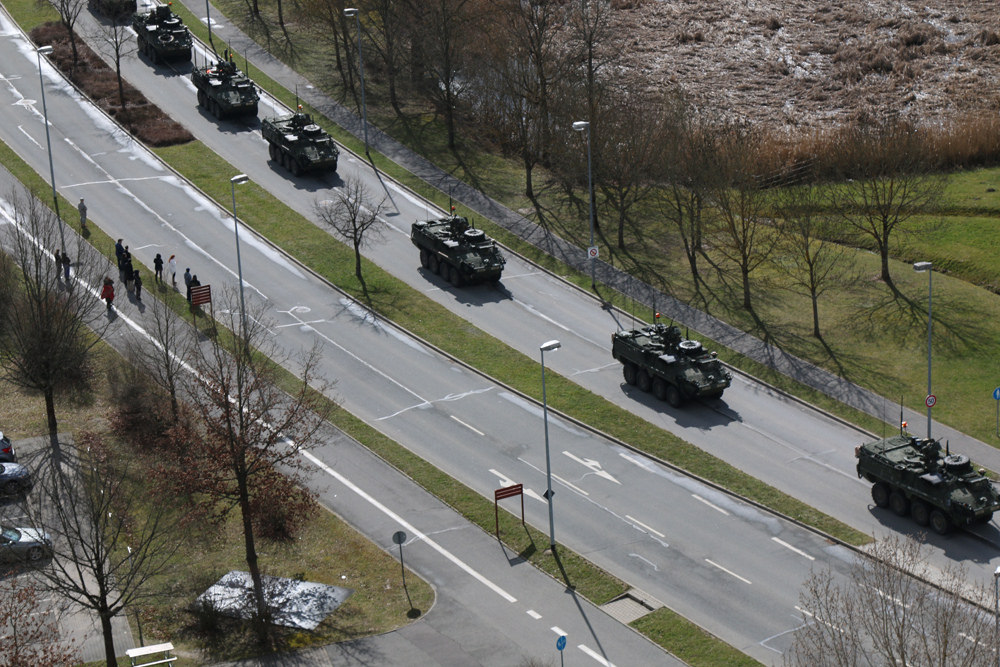
A U.S. Army convoy in Vilseck, Germany during Operation Atlantic Resolve, NATO's efforts to reassert its military presence in central and eastern Europe that began in April 2014.

On 4 March 2014, the United States pledged $1 billion in aid to Ukraine, but not lethal, all along the Obama presidency. Donald Trump reversed this policy and announced the sale of enhanced defensive capabilities, including anti-tank weapons, in December 2017. Russia's actions increased tensions in nearby countries historically within its sphere of influence, particularly the Baltic and Moldova. All have large Russian-speaking populations, and Russian troops are stationed in the breakaway Moldovan territory of Transnistria. Some devoted resources to increasing defensive capabilities, and many requested increased support from the U.S. and the North Atlantic Treaty Organization, which they had joined in recent years. The conflict "reinvigorated" NATO, which had been created to face the Soviet Union but had devoted more resources to "expeditionary missions" in recent years.

In addition to diplomatic support in its conflict with Russia, the U.S. provided Ukraine with US$1.5 billion in military aid during the 2010s. In 2018 the U.S. House of Representatives passed a provision blocking any training of the Azov Battalion of the Ukrainian National Guard by American forces. In previous years, between 2014 and 2017, the U.S. House of Representatives passed amendments banning support of Azov, but due to pressure from the Pentagon, the amendments were quietly lifted.

==== Financial markets ====
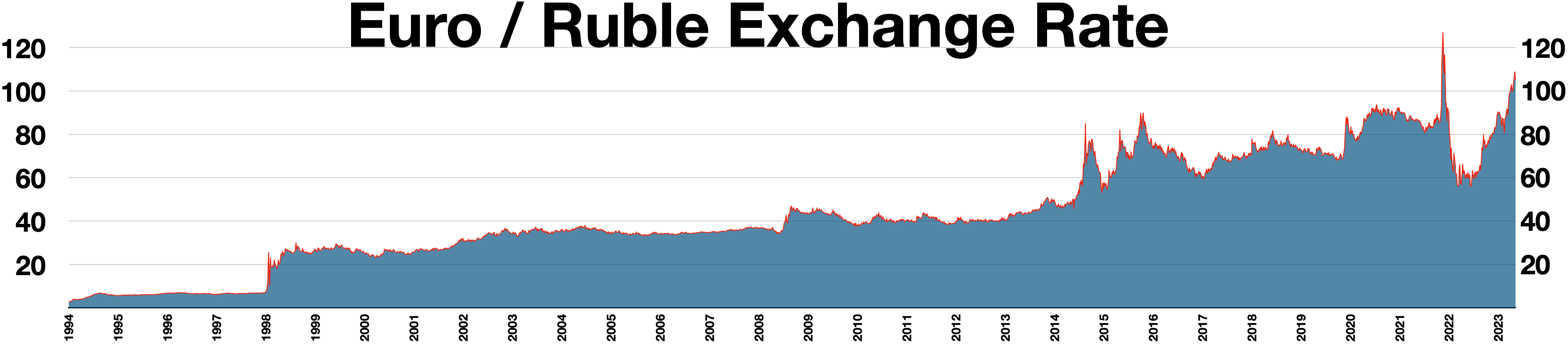
Euro/RUB exchange rate

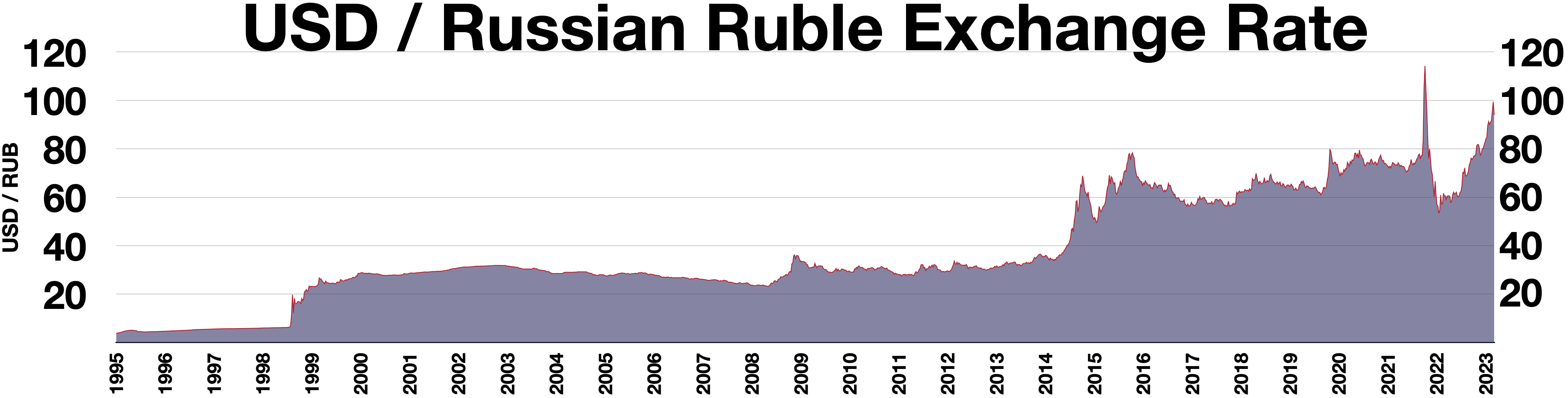
USD/Russian Ruble Exchange Rate

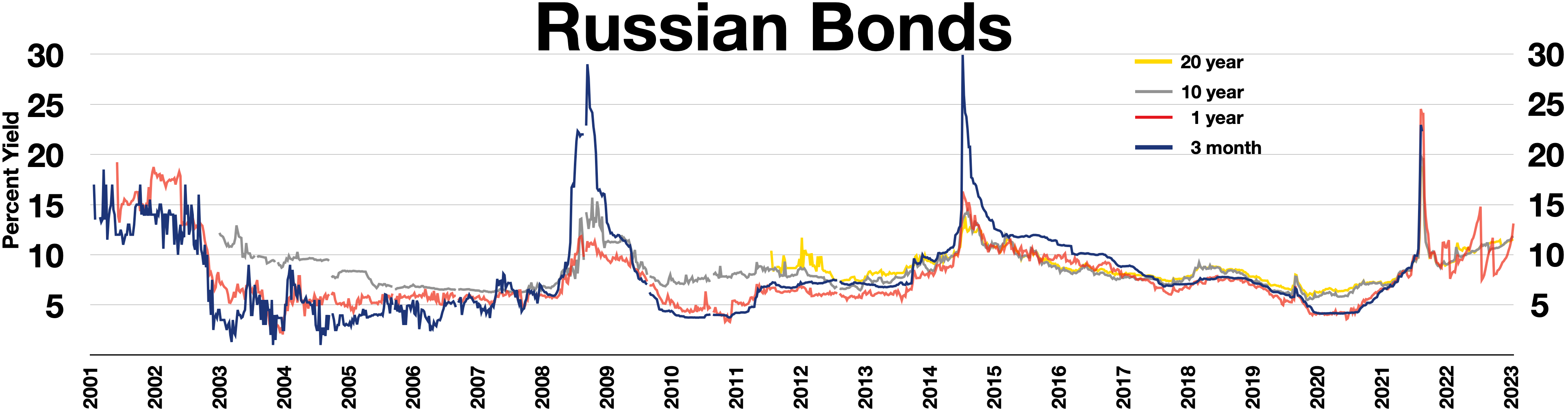
Russian bonds displayed inverted yield curves as the government sought to tame inflation during the Russo-Ukrainian War and 2022 Russian invasion of Ukraine 20 year bond 10 year bond 1 year bond 3 month bond

The initial reaction to the escalation of tensions in Crimea caused the Russian and European stock markets to tumble. The intervention caused the Swiss franc to climb to a 2-year high against the dollar and a 1-year high against the euro. The Euro and the US dollar both rose, as did the Australian dollar. The Russian stock market declined by more than 10 percent, while the Russian ruble hit all-time lows against the US dollar and the Euro. The Russian central bank hiked interest rates and intervened in the foreign exchange markets to the tune of $12 billion to try to stabilise its currency. Prices for wheat and grain rose, with Ukraine being a major exporter of both crops.

Later in March 2014, the reaction of the financial markets to the Crimea annexation was surprisingly mellow, with global financial markets rising immediately after the referendum held in Crimea, one explanation being that the sanctions were already priced in following the earlier Russian incursion. Other observers considered that the positive reaction of the global financial markets on Monday 17 March 2014, after the announcement of sanctions against Russia by the EU and the US, revealed that these sanctions were too weak to hurt Russia. In early August 2014, the German DAX was down by 6 percent for the year and 11 percent since June, over concerns Russia, Germany's 13th biggest trade partner, would retaliate against sanctions.

=== Reactions to the war in Donbas ===
==== Ukrainian public opinion ====
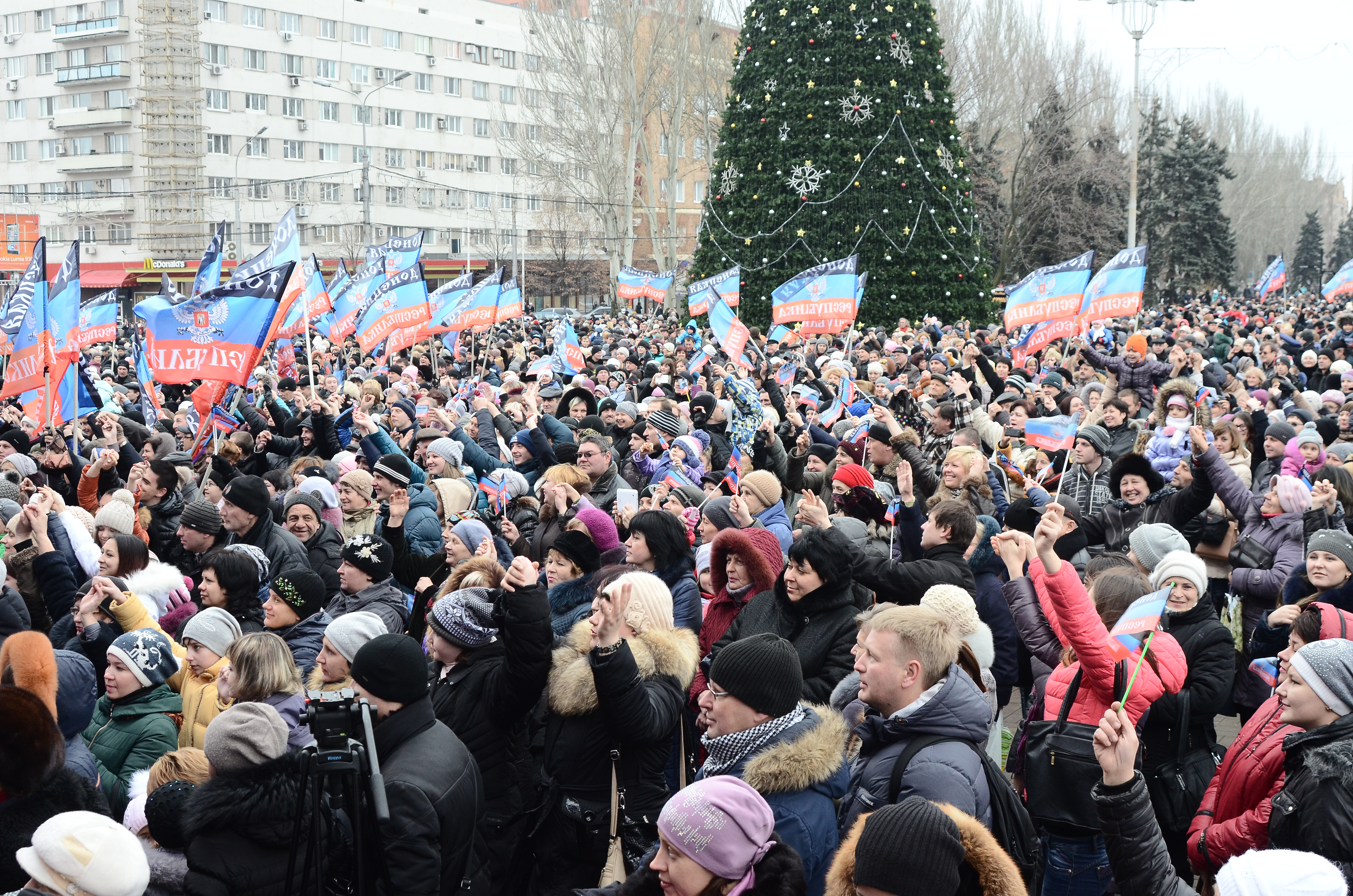
Pro-Russian supporters in Donetsk, 20 December 2014

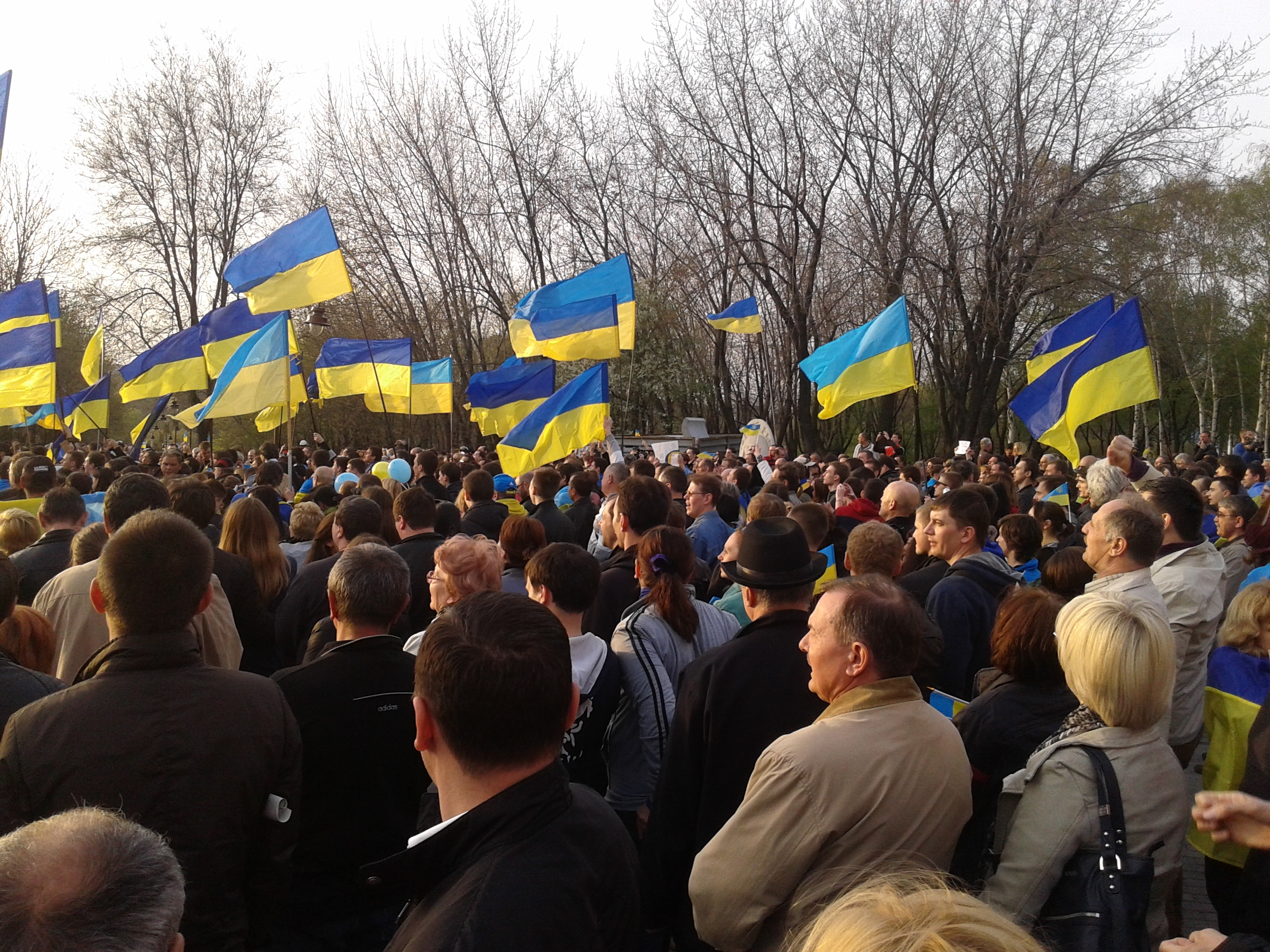
Pro-Ukrainian supporters in Donetsk, 17 April 2014

From 12 to 25 September 2014, the International Republican Institute ran a poll, excluding Russian-annexed Crimea, of the Ukrainian public. 89% of those polled opposed 2014 Russian military intervention in Ukraine. As broken down by region, 78% of those polled from Eastern Ukraine (including Dnipropetrovsk Oblast) opposed said intervention, along with 89% in Southern Ukraine, 93% in Central Ukraine, and 99% in Western Ukraine. As broken down by native language, 79% of Russian speakers and 95% of Ukrainian speakers opposed the intervention. 80% of those polled said the country should remain a unitary country.

On 16–22 January 2015, the Ukrainian branch of Germany's biggest market research organisation, GfK, ran a poll of the Crimean public in Russian-annexed Crimea. According to its results, "Eighty-two per cent of those polled said they fully supported Crimea's inclusion in Russia, and another 11 per cent expressed partial support. Only 4 per cent spoke out against it."

A joint poll conducted by Levada and the Kyiv International Institute of Sociology from September to October 2020 found that in the breakaway regions controlled by the DPR/LPR, just over half of the respondents wanted to join Russia (either with or without some autonomous status), while less than one-tenth wanted independence and 12% wanted reintegration into Ukraine. It contrasted with respondents in Kyiv-controlled Donbas, where a vast majority felt the separatist regions should be returned to Ukraine. According to results from Levada in January 2022, roughly 70% of those in the breakaway regions said their territories should become part of the Russian Federation.

==== Russian public opinion ====
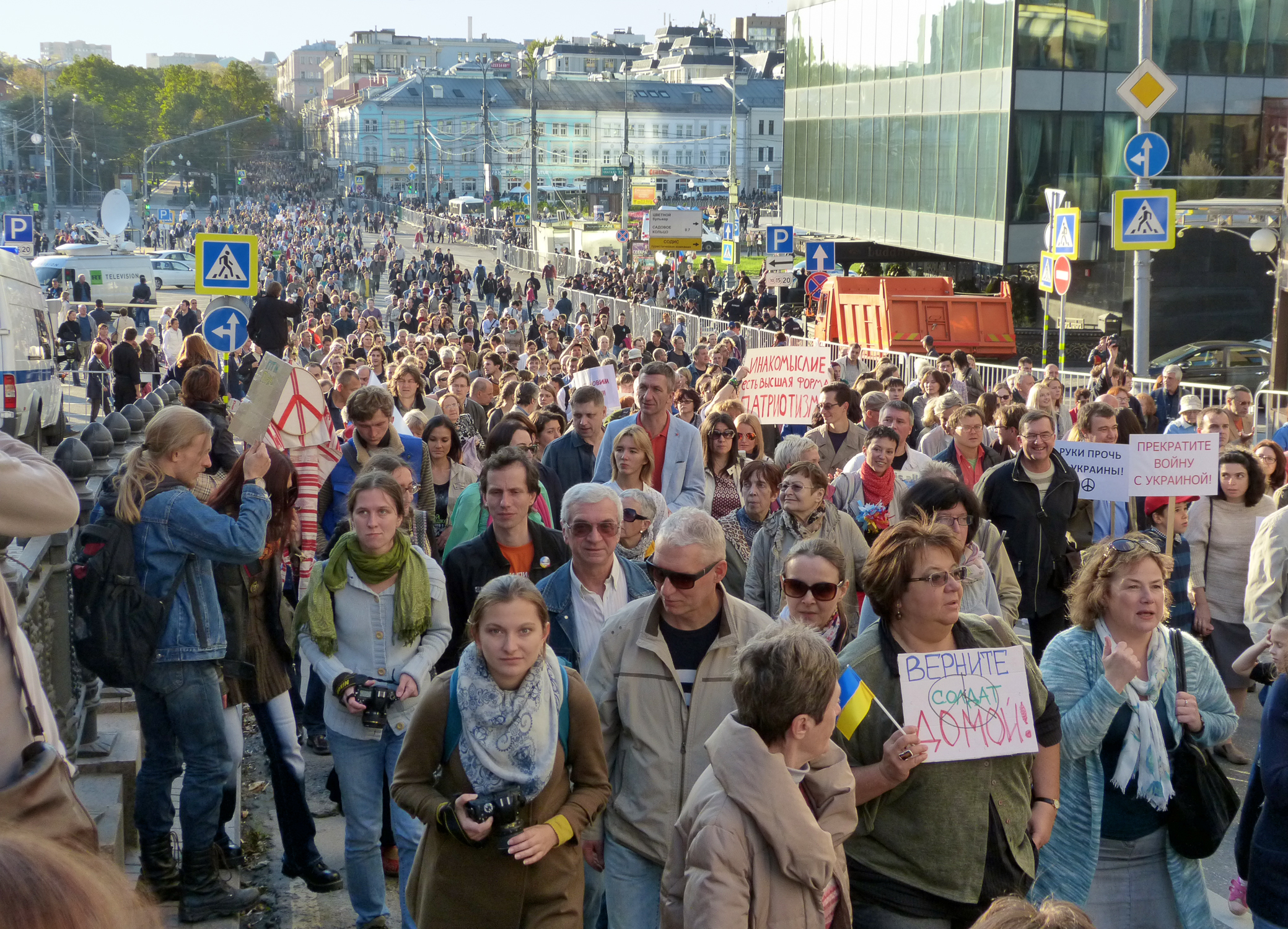
Peace march in Moscow, 21 September 2014

An August 2014 survey by the Levada Centre reported that only 13% of those Russians polled would support the Russian government in an open war with Ukraine. Street protests against the war in Ukraine arose in Russia. Notable protests first occurred in March and large protests occurred in September when "tens of thousands" protested the war in Ukraine with a peace march in downtown Moscow on Sunday, 21 September 2014, "under heavy police supervision."

=== Reactions to the 2022 Russian invasion of Ukraine ===
==== Ukrainian public opinion ====
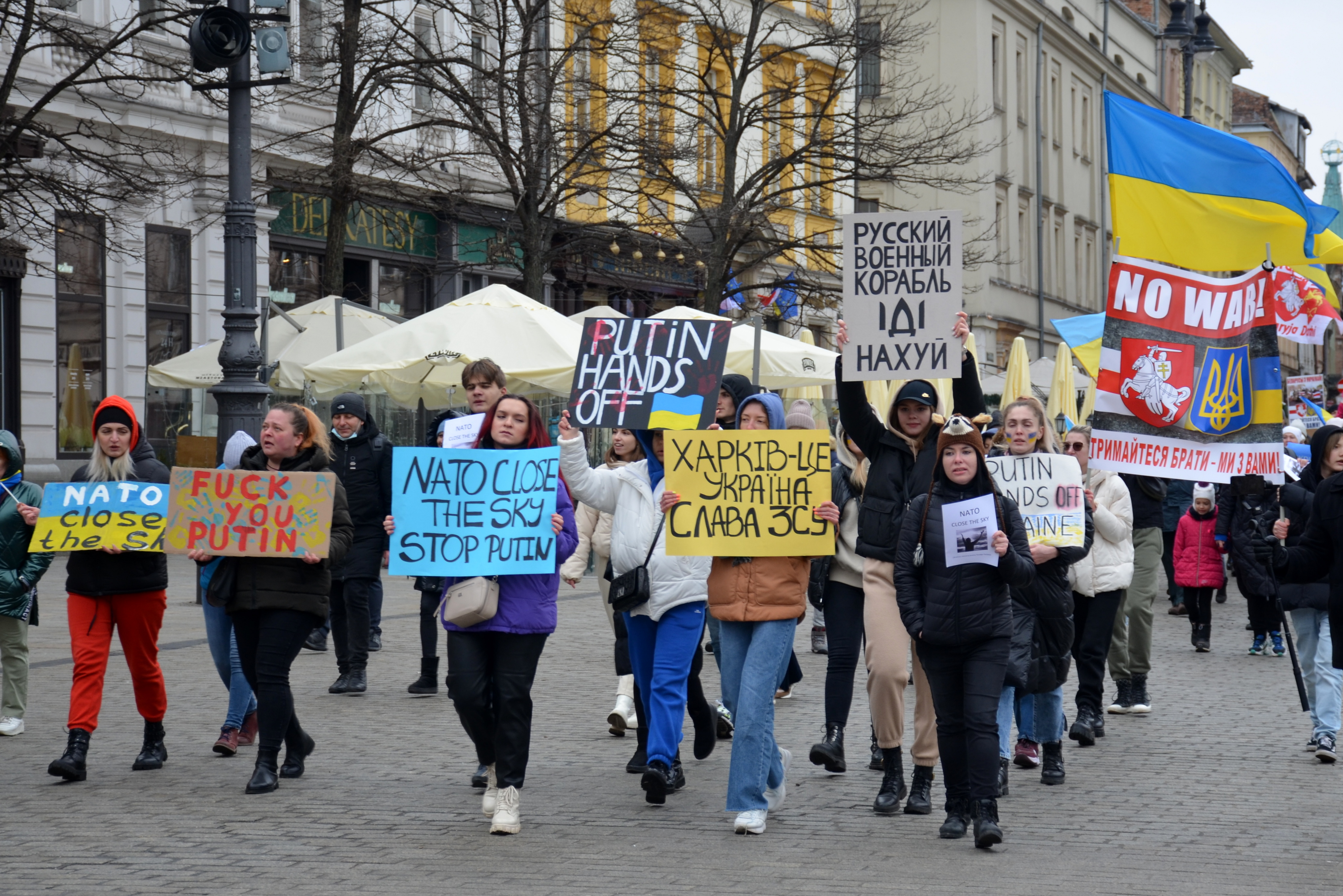
Ukrainian refugees in Kraków protest against the war, 6 March 2022

In March 2022, a week after the Russian invasion of Ukraine, 98% of Ukrainians—including 82% of ethnic Russians living in Ukraine—said they did not believe that any part of Ukraine was rightfully part of Russia, according to Lord Ashcroft's polls which did not include Crimea and the separatist-controlled part of Donbas. 97% of Ukrainians said they had an unfavourable view of Russian president Vladimir Putin, with a further 94% saying they had an unfavourable view of the Russian Armed Forces.

At the end of 2021, 75% of Ukrainians said they had a positive attitude toward ordinary Russians, while in May 2022, 82% of Ukrainians said they had a negative attitude toward ordinary Russians.

A Razumkov Centre poll conducted from 19 to 25 January 2024 found that Russia was the most negatively viewed country in Ukraine, with it being viewed negatively by 95% of Ukrainian respondents. The second, third and fourth most negatively viewed countries were Belarus (87%), Iran (82%) and China (72.5%), respectively. Ukrainian respondents were most positive towards Lithuania (91%), Latvia (90.5%), the UK (90%), Germany (89%), Estonia (89%), Canada (88%) and the US (87%).

Gallup opinion polls on whether Ukrainians want a negotiated end to the war as soon as possible, rather than fighting until Ukraine wins, have increased from 22% at the start of the war to 69% in 2025, with it becoming the majority opinion in late 2023.

==== Russian public opinion ====
Russia Countries on Russia's "Unfriendly Countries List". The list includes countries that have imposed sanctions against Russia for its invasion of Ukraine.

An April 2022 survey by the Levada Centre reported that approximately 74% of the Russians polled supported the "special military operation" in Ukraine, suggesting that Russian public opinion has shifted considerably since 2014. According to some sources, a reason many Russians supported the "special military operation" has to do with the propaganda and disinformation. In addition, it has been suggested that some respondents did not want to answer pollsters' questions for fear of negative consequences. At the end of March, a poll conducted in Russia by the Levada Center concluded the following: When asked why they think the military operation is taking place, respondents said it was to protect and defend civilians, ethnic Russians or Russian speakers in Ukraine (43%), to prevent an attack on Russia (25%), to get rid of nationalists and "denazify" Ukraine (21%), and to incorporate Ukraine or the Donbas region into Russia (3%)." According to polls, the Russian president's rating rose from 71% on the eve of the invasion to 82% in March 2023.

The Kremlin's analysis concluded that public support for the war was broad but not deep and that most Russians would accept anything Putin would call a victory. In September 2023, the head of the VTsIOM state pollster, Valery Fyodorov, said in an interview that only 10–15% of Russians actively supported the war and that "most Russians are not demanding the conquest of Kyiv or Odesa." On the accuracy of public opinion polls, Russian-born political activist Vladimir Kara-Murza said, "I see Russian pollsters say that the average response rate to polls in Russia average from five to seven per-cent; some 90% of the people refuse to say in polls, and [for] very good reasons. It is impossible to judge the true state of public opinion in a country that imprisons you for expressing it. ...The Putin propaganda machine tries to pretend that Russian society is a monolith, that all Russians support this war, that all Russians support this regime, and this is a lie, needless to say."

In 2023, Oleg Orlov, the chairman of the Board of Human Rights Center "Memorial," claimed that Russia under Vladimir Putin had descended into fascism and that the army was committing "mass murder."

==== United States ====
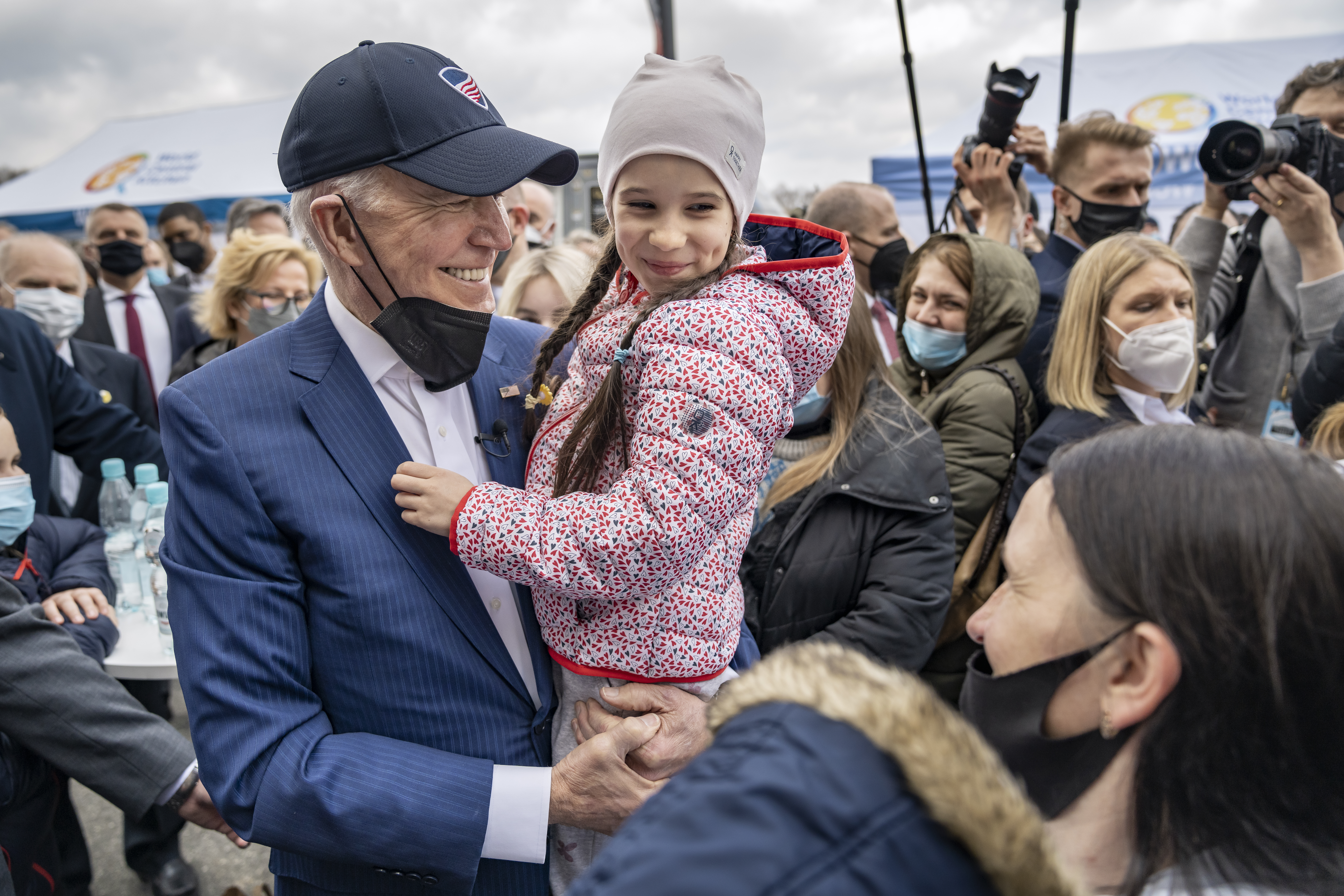
American president Joe Biden holding a Ukrainian refugee at Warsaw's Kazimierz Górski National Stadium in a meeting where he described Russian president Vladimir Putin as "butcher", 26 March 2022

On 28 April 2022, US President Joe Biden asked Congress for an additional $33 billion to assist Ukraine, including $20 billion to provide weapons to Ukraine. On 5 May, Ukraine's Prime Minister Denys Shmyhal announced that Ukraine had received more than $12 billion worth of weapons and financial aid from Western countries since the start of Russia's invasion on 24 February. On 21 May 2022, the United States passed legislation providing $40 billion in new military and humanitarian foreign aid to Ukraine, marking a historically large commitment of funds. In August 2022, U.S. defence spending to counter the Russian war effort exceeded the first 5 years of war costs in Afghanistan. The Washington Post reported that new U.S. weapons delivered to the Ukrainian war front suggest a closer combat scenario with more casualties. The United States looks to build "enduring strength in Ukraine" with increased arms shipments and a record-breaking $3 billion military aid package.

On 7 March 2024, American president Joe Biden, in his 2024 State of the Union Address, compared Russia under Vladimir Putin to Adolf Hitler's conquests of Europe.

Following the second inauguration of Donald Trump, the American administration's support to Ukraine decreased, and in March 2025 the United States paused military aid to Ukraine after the 2025 Trump–Zelenskyy Oval Office meeting; the aid was later resumed. On 22 May 2025, after months of peace negotiations without a bilateral agreement between Russia and Ukraine, the United States together with other G7 countries united to condemn Russia's continued brutal war against Ukraine. The G7 also declared its continued commitment to supporting Ukraine in defending the country's territorial integrity and right to exist, as well as its freedom, sovereignty, and independence, all with the aim of a just and durable peace.

==== Russian military suppliers ====
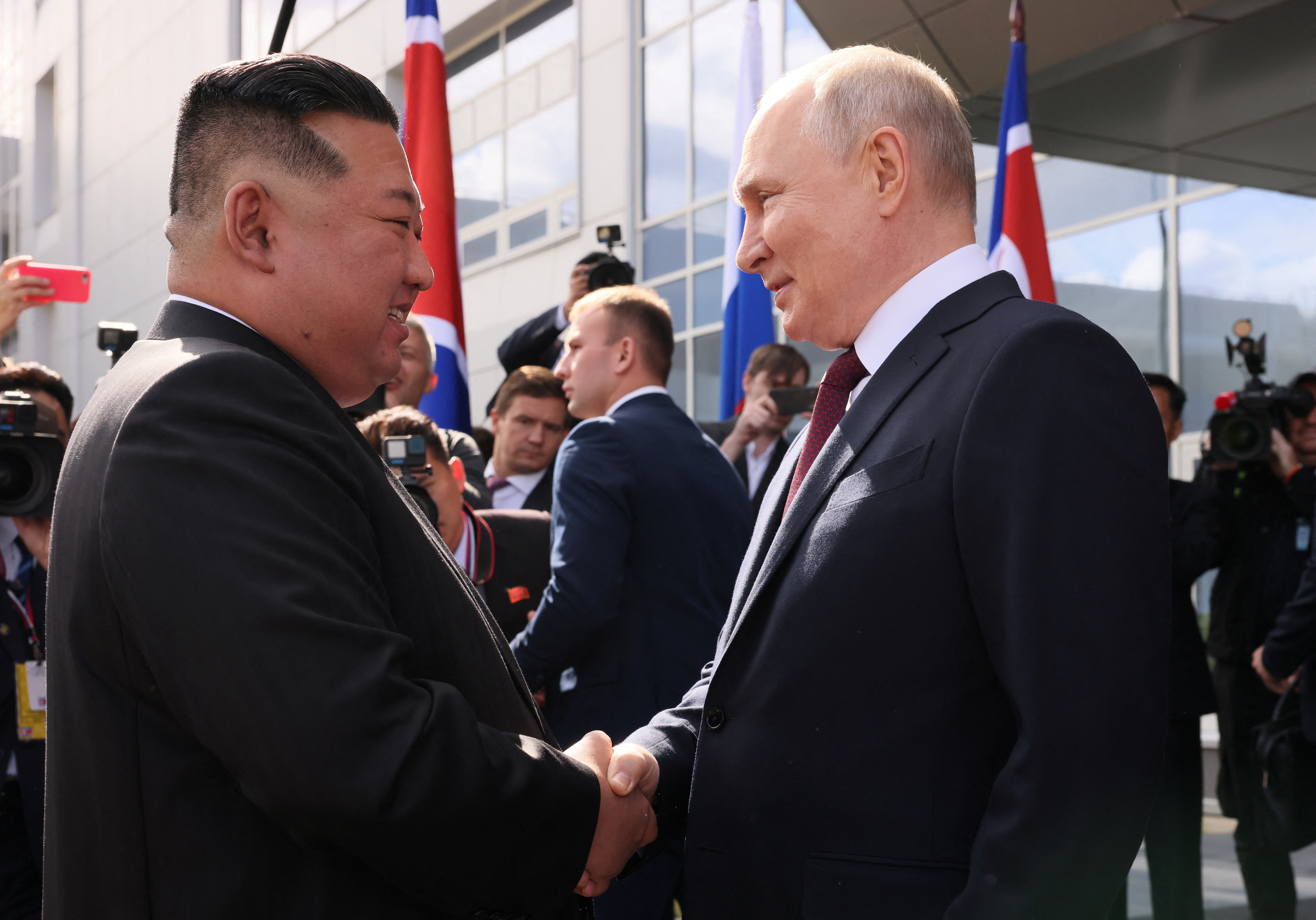
Kim Jong Un and Putin meeting at Vostochny Cosmodrome in 2023 where Kim gave his support for Russia's "sacred fight" against the "hegemonic forces that oppose Russia"

After expending large amounts of heavy weapons and munitions over months, Russia received combat drones, loitering munitions, and large amounts of artillery from Iran, deliveries of tanks and other armoured vehicles from Belarus, and reportedly planned to trade for artillery ammunition from North Korea and ballistic missiles from Iran.

The U.S. has accused China of providing Russia with technology it needs for high-tech weapons, allegations that China has denied. The U.S. sanctioned a Chinese firm for providing satellite imagery to Russian mercenary forces fighting in Ukraine.

In March 2023, Western nations had pressed the United Arab Emirates to halt re-exports of goods to Russia that had military uses, amidst allegations that the Gulf country exported 158 drones to Russia in 2022. In May 2023, the U.S. accused South Africa of supplying arms to Russia in a covert naval operation, allegations which have been denied by South African president Cyril Ramaphosa.

==== United Nations ====
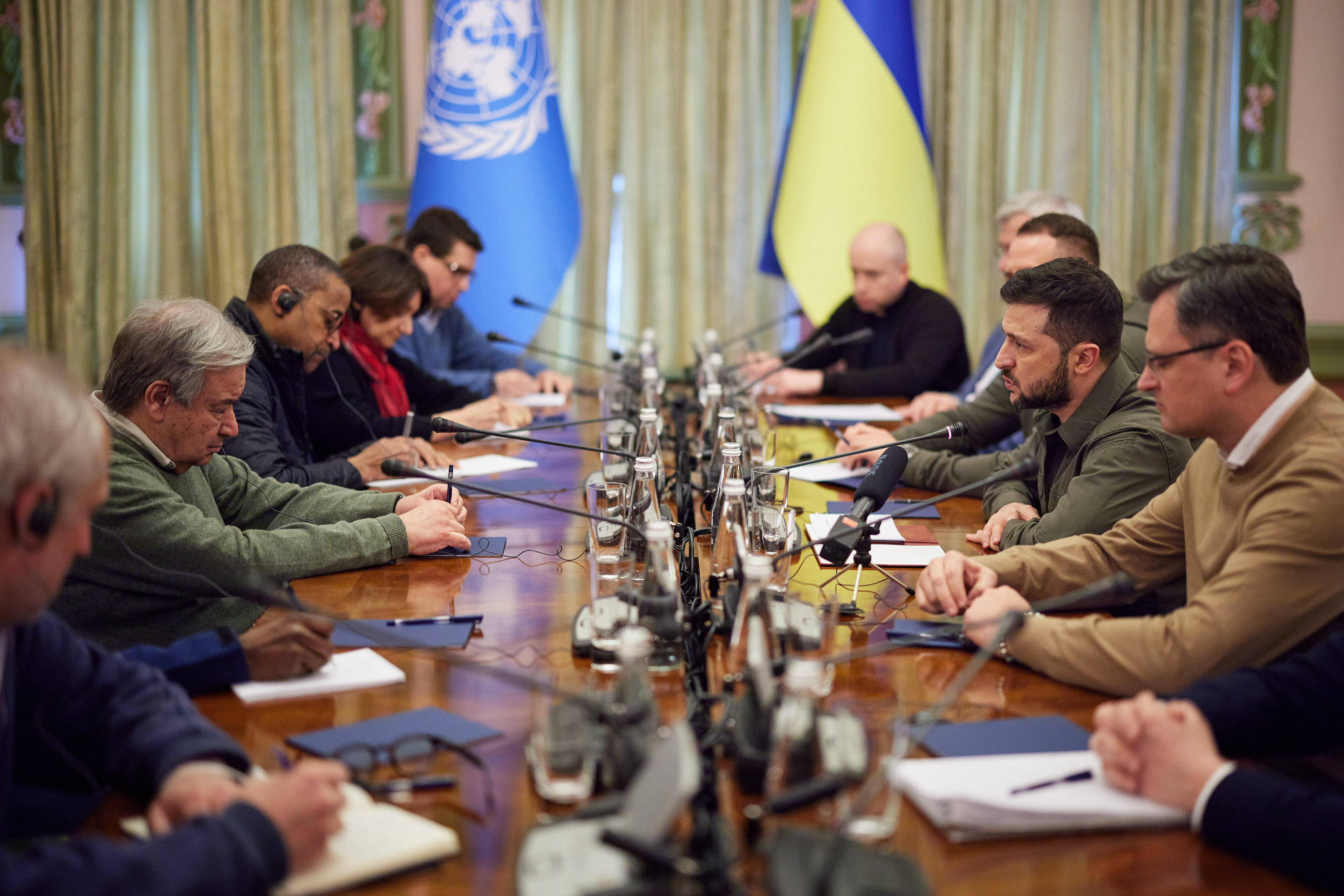
United Nations secretary-general António Guterres and Ukrainian president Volodymyr Zelenskyy delegations meeting in April 2022

On 25 February 2022, the Security Council failed to adopt a draft resolution that would have "deplored, in the strongest terms, the Russian Federation's aggression" on Ukraine. Of the 15 member states on the Security Council, 11 were in support, while three abstained from voting. The draft resolution failed due to a Russian veto.

Due to the deadlock, the Security Council passed a resolution to convene the General Assembly for the eleventh emergency special session. On 2 March 2022, the General Assembly voted to deplore "in the strongest possible terms" Russia's aggression against Ukraine by a vote of 141 to 5, with 35 abstentions. The resolution also called for the Russian Federation to "immediately cease its use of force against Ukraine" and "immediately, completely, and unconditionally withdraw all of its military forces." Only Russia, Belarus, Syria, North Korea, and Eritrea voted against the resolution.

On 4 March 2022, the UN Human Rights Council adopted a resolution by a vote of 32 to 2, with 13 abstentions, calling for the withdrawal of Russian troops and Russian-backed armed groups from Ukraine and humanitarian access to people in need. The resolution also established a commission to investigate alleged rights violations committed during Russia's military attack on Ukraine.

In October 2022, the United Nations General Assembly had adopted a resolution condemning the 2022 annexation referendums in Russian-occupied Ukraine with 143 supporting votes, 5 opposing votes (Belarus, North Korea, Nicaragua, Russia, and Syria), and 35 abstentions.

== See also ==
- Fiber optic drone – Uncrewed vehicle guided by an optical fiber
- List of conflicts in Europe
- List of invasions and occupations of Ukraine
- List of invasions in the 21st century
- List of ongoing armed conflicts
- List of wars involving Russia
- List of wars involving Ukraine
- Modern history of Ukraine
- New generation warfare – Russian theory of unconventional warfare
- Outline of the Russo-Ukrainian War
