= Patriarch Kirill of Moscow =

21st-century primate of the Russian Orthodox Church

His Holiness Kirill
- Patriarch of Moscow and all Rus'
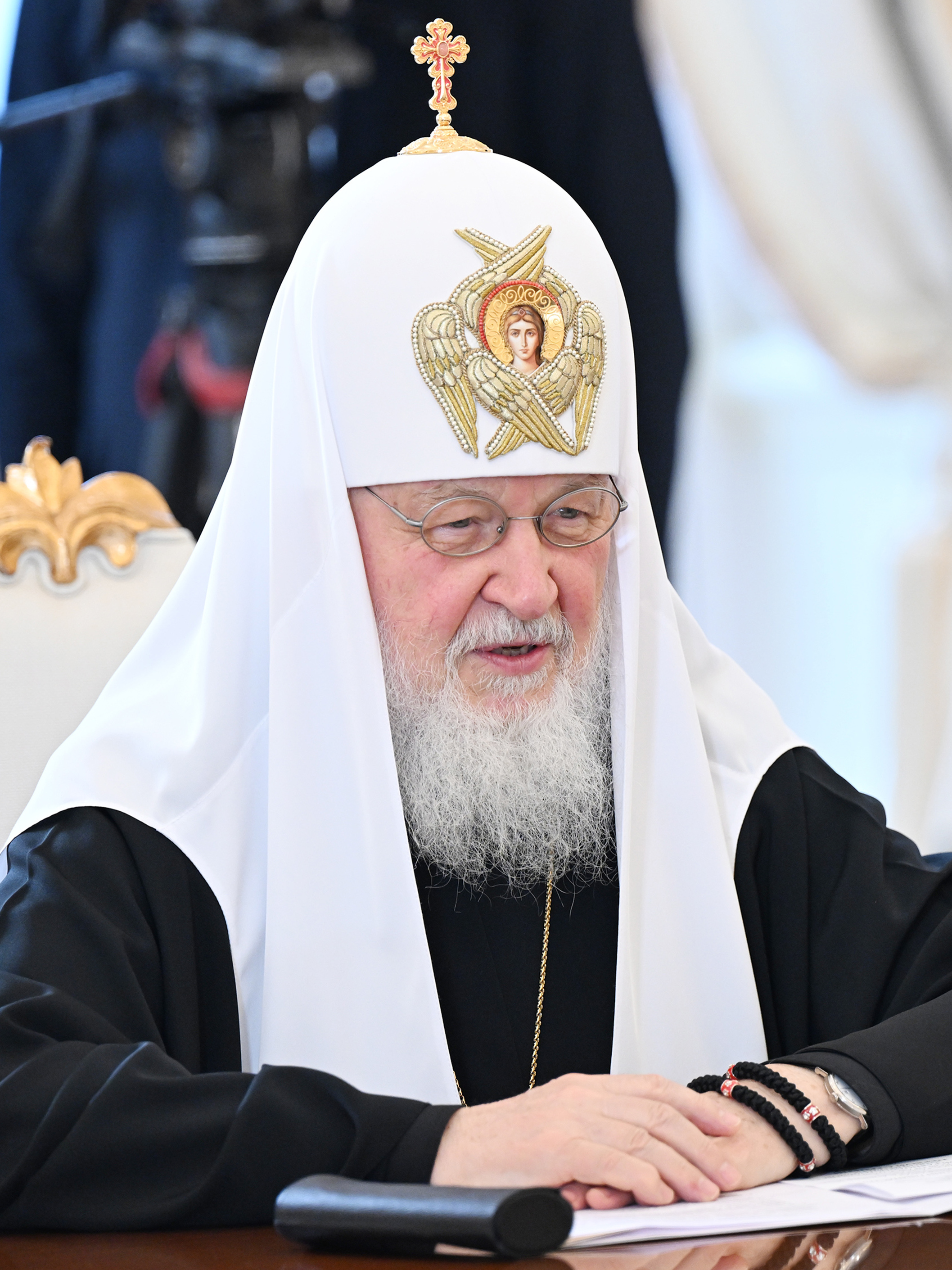
- Kirill in 2025
- Native name: Кирилл
- Church: Russian Orthodox Church
- See: Moscow
- Installed: 1 February 2009
- Predecessor: Alexy II

Orders
- Ordination: 7 April 1969
- Consecration: 14 March 1976 by Nikodim (Rotov)

Personal details
- Born: Vladimir Mikhailovich Gundyayev; 20 November 1946 (age 79) Leningrad, Russian SFSR, Soviet Union
- Denomination: Eastern Orthodox Church
- Education: Leningrad Theological Academy

- Coat of arms

Styles of Patriarch Kirill
- Reference style: His Holiness
- Spoken style: Your Holiness
- Religious style: Patriarch

Kirill or Cyril (Russian: Кирилл; Church Slavonic: Кѷріллъ; secular name Vladimir Mikhailovich Gundyayev, (Note: In this name that follows East Slavic naming customs, the patronymic is Mikhailovich and the family name is Gundyayev.) Russian: Владимир Михайлович Гундяев; born 20 November 1946) is a Russian Orthodox bishop. He became Patriarch of Moscow and all Rus' and Primate of the Russian Orthodox Church on 1 February 2009. Prior to becoming Patriarch, Kirill was Archbishop (later Metropolitan) of Smolensk and Kaliningrad, and also Chairman of the Russian Orthodox Church's Department for External Church Relations. He has been a permanent member of the Holy Synod since 1989.

A close ally of Russian leader Vladimir Putin, Kirill has described Putin's rule as "a miracle of God". According to Putin, Kirill's father baptized him. During his tenure as Patriarch of Moscow and all Rus', Kirill has brought the Russian Orthodox Church closer to the Russian state. Kirill's relationship with Bartholomew I of Constantinople, Ecumenical Patriarch and the spiritual leader of Eastern Orthodox Christians worldwide, has been tense.

Kirill has lauded the Russian invasion of Ukraine, justifying the war as a struggle against "forces of evil". The World Russian People's Council under his leadership described the conflict as a "Holy War". Clergy in other Orthodox Churches have condemned his remarks, with Bartholomew I saying that Kirill's support for Putin and the war were "damaging to the prestige of the whole of Orthodoxy".

== Early life and career ==
Kirill was born Vladimir Mikhailovich Gundyayev in Leningrad (present-day Saint Petersburg) on 20 November 1946. His father, Rev. Mikhail Gundyaev, died in 1974. His mother, Raisa Gundyaeva, a teacher of German, died in 1984. His elder brother, Archpriest Nikolay Gundyaev, is a professor at Leningrad Theological Academy and rector of the Holy Transfiguration Cathedral in St. Petersburg. His grandfather, Rev. Vasily Gundyaev, a Solovki prisoner, was imprisoned and exiled in the 1920s, 1930s and 1940s for his church activity and struggle against Renovationism.

After finishing the eighth grade (year 9), Vladimir Gundyayev obtained a job in the Leningrad Geological Expedition and worked for it from 1962 to 1965 as cartographer, combining work with studies at secondary school. After graduation from school, he entered the Leningrad Seminary and later the Leningrad Theological Academy, from which he graduated cum laude in 1970.

On 3 April 1969, Metropolitan Nicodemus (Rotov) of Leningrad and Novgorod tonsured him with the name of Kirill after saint Cyril the Philosopher and on 7 April ordained him as hierodeacon and on 1 June as hieromonk. From 1970 to 1971, Father Kirill taught Dogmatic Theology and acted as rector's assistant for students' affairs at the Leningrad Theological Schools and at the same time worked as personal secretary to Metropolitan Nicodem and supervising instructor of the first-grade seminarians.

== Episcopal ministry ==
=== Archimandrite ===
On 12 September 1971, Kirill was elevated to the rank of archimandrite and was posted as a representative of the Russian Orthodox Church to the World Council of Churches (WCC) in Geneva. On 26 December 1974, he was appointed rector of the Leningrad Academy and Seminary. Since December 1975, he has been a member of the WCC central committee and executive committee.

In 1971, he was appointed representative of the Moscow Patriarchate at the World Council of Churches and has been actively involved in the ecumenical activity of the Russian Orthodox Church since then.

Since 1994, Kirill has hosted a weekly Orthodox television program, Слово пастыря (The Word of the Shepherd), on ORT/Channel One.

=== Archbishop ===
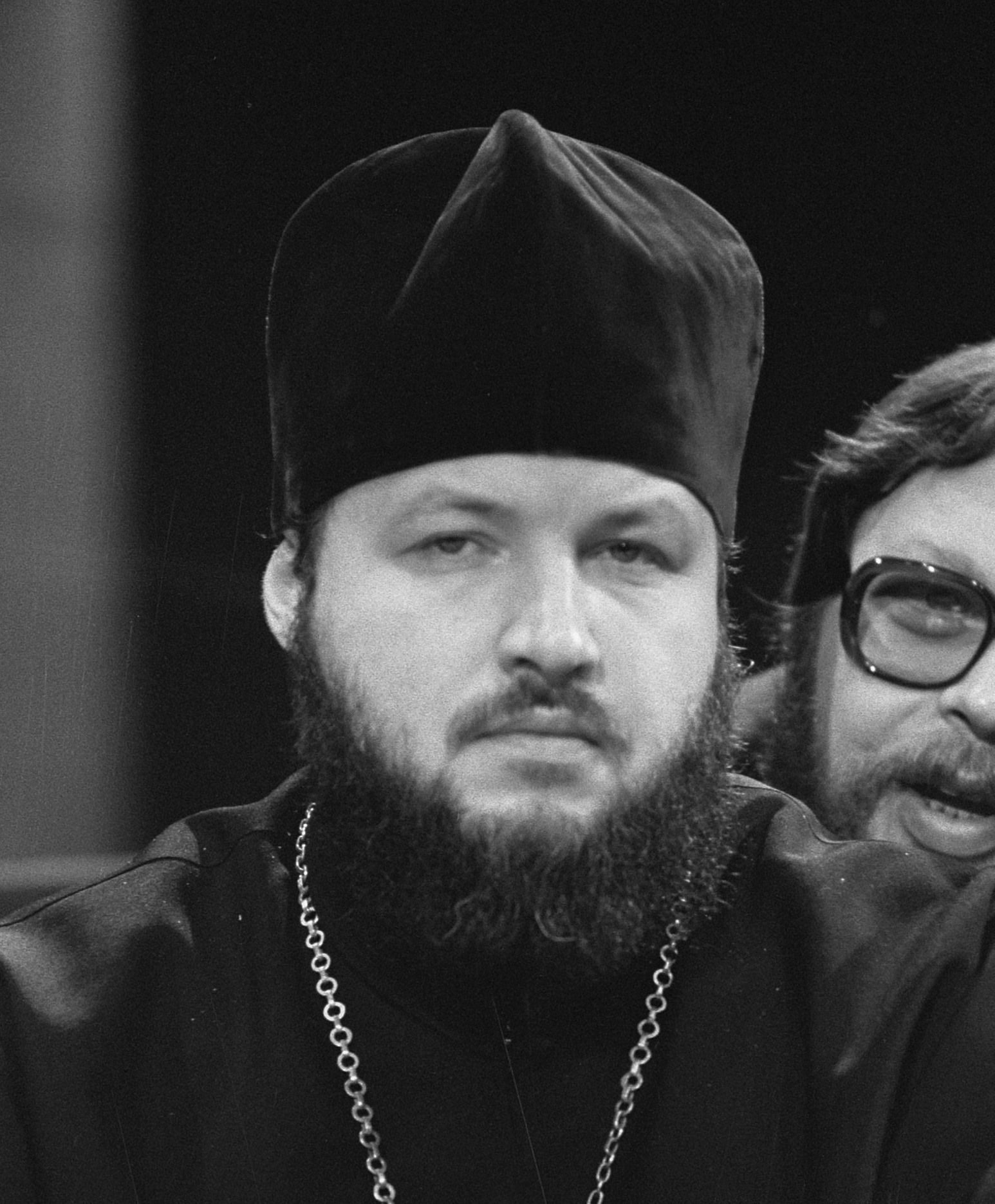
Archbishop Kirill at a conference on nuclear weapons and disarmament in Amsterdam in 1981

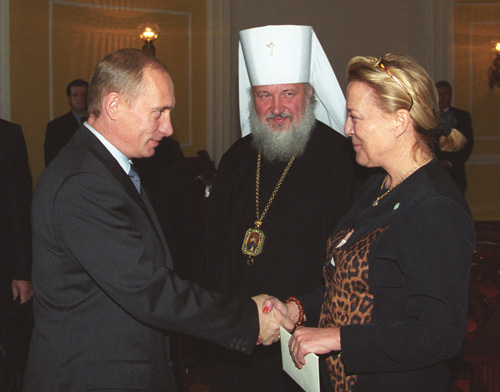
Vladimir Putin, Metropolitan Kirill and Xenia Sheremeteva-Yusupova, October 2001

- On 14 March 1976, Archimandrite Kirill was consecrated Bishop of Vyborg, Vicar of the Leningrad diocese.
- On 2 September 1977, he was elevated to the rank of archbishop.
- From 26 December 1984, he was Archbishop of Smolensk and Vyazma.
- From 1986 – administrator of the parishes in the Kaliningrad Region.
- From 1988, he became Archbishop of Smolensk and Kaliningrad.
- On 13 November 1989, he was appointed chairman of the department for external church relations and permanent member of the Holy Synod.
- On 25 February 1991, Archbishop Kirill was elevated to the rank of metropolitan.

The Supreme Authority of the Church charged Kirill with the following functions:

- from 1975 to 1982 – chairman of the Leningrad Diocesan Council;
- from 1975 to 1998 – member of the Central and Executive Committees of the World Council of Churches;
- from 1976 to 1978 – deputy Patriarchal Exarch for Western Europe;
- from 1976 to 1984 – member of the Holy Synod commission for Christian unity;
- from 1978 to 1984 – administrator of the Patriarchal Parishes in Finland;
- from 1978 to 1988 – member of the Millennium of the Baptism of Russia preparatory commission;
- in 1990 – member of the preparatory commission for the Local Council of the Russian Orthodox Church;
- in 1990 – member of the commission for assistance in overcoming the consequences of the Chernobyl accident;
- from 1989 to 1996 – administrator of the Hungarian Orthodox deanery;
- from 1990 to 1991 – temporary administrator of the diocese of the Hague and Netherlands;
- from 1990 to 1993 – temporary administrator of the diocese of Korsun;
- from 1990 to 1993 – chairman of the Holy Synod commission for reviving religion and moral.

=== Foreign relations ===
On 20 October 2008, while on a tour of Latin America, he had a meeting with First Secretary of the Communist Party of Cuba Fidel Castro. Castro commended Metropolitan Kirill as his ally in combating "American imperialism". Kirill awarded Fidel and Raúl Castro the Order of St. Daniel of Moscow on behalf of Patriarch Alexy II in recognition of their decision to build the first Russian Orthodox Church in Havana, to serve the Russian expatriates living there.

He was criticised by some for the ROC's failures in the Diocese of Sourozh and Ukraine.

== Patriarch of Moscow ==
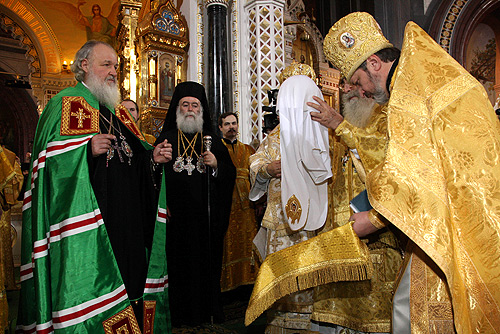
Kirill being presented with the patriarchal koukoulion during his enthronement

On 6 December 2008, the day after the death of Patriarch Alexy II, the Russian Holy Synod elected him locum tenens of the Patriarchal throne. On 9 December, during the funeral service for Alexey II in Christ the Saviour Cathedral (which was broadcast live by Russia's state TV channels), he was seen and reported to have fainted at one point. On 27 January 2009, the ROC Local Council (the 2009 Pomestny Sobor) elected Kirill I of Moscow as Patriarch of Moscow and All Rus, with 508 votes out of 700. He was enthroned on 1 February 2009.

=== Ecumenism ===
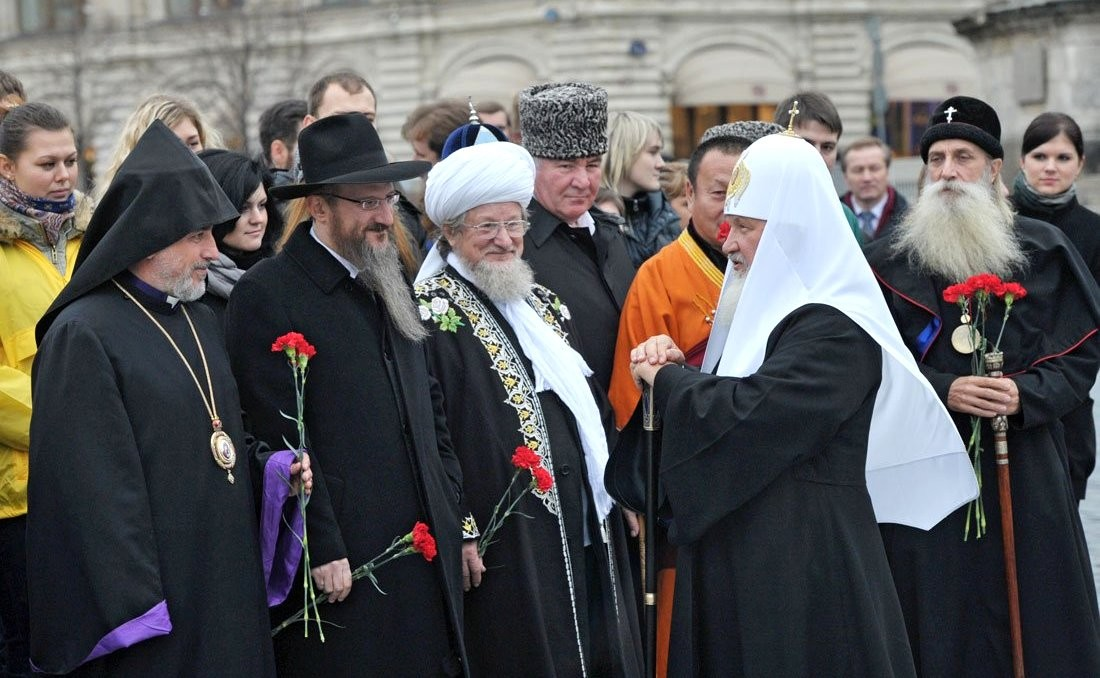
Russian religious leaders (Armenian, Jewish, Muslim, Buddhist, Orthodox, Old Believer) during the official celebrations of the National Unity Day, 4 November 2012

The conservative wing in the Russian Orthodox Church criticized Kirill for practicing ecumenism throughout the 1990s. In 2008, breakaway Bishop Diomid of Anadyr and Chukotka criticized him for associating himself with the Catholic Church. However, in a 2009 statement, Kirill stated that there could be no doctrinal compromise with the Catholic Church, and that discussions with them did not have the goal of seeking unification.

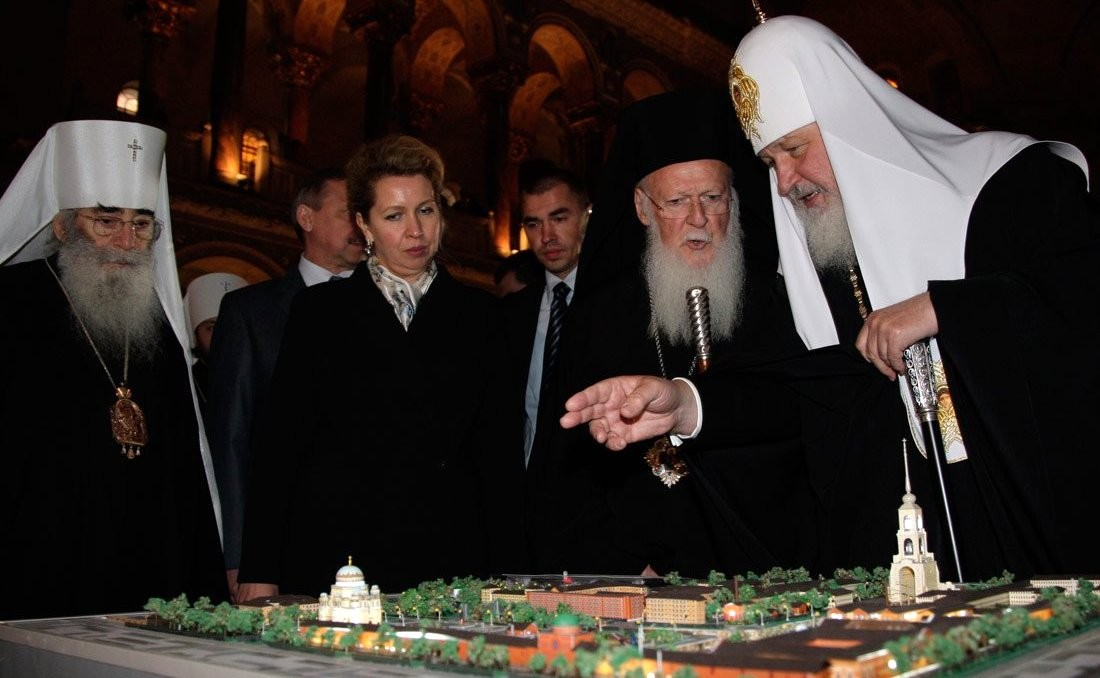
Kirill and Bartholomew I of Constantinople in 2010

On 12 February 2016, Kirill and Pope Francis, the head of the Roman Catholic Church, met at José Martí International Airport near Havana, Cuba, and signed a thirty point joint declaration, prepared in advance, addressing global issues including their hope for re–establishment of full unity, the persecution of Christians in the Middle East, the Syrian Civil War and church organisation in Ukraine. This was the first meeting between a pope and a Russian Orthodox patriarch.

On 3 September 2019, Kirill and Paulose II, the head of the Malankara Orthodox Syrian Church, met at the Patriarchal and Synod residence in St. Daniel Monastery, Moscow. During this meeting, Kirill supported the proposals made by Paulose II for cooperation in academics pertaining to iconography, church choristers, monasticism, pilgrimages, summer institutes and academic conferences.

=== Administrative reform ===
Patriarch Kirill introduced significant changes in the administrative structure of the Church. On 31 March 2009, the Holy Synod, at its first meeting under the chairmanship of the newly elected Patriarch Kirill, reformed the DECR, forming new synodal institutions, which were entrusted with certain areas of activity previously dealt with by the DECR. The Department for Church-Society Relations, independent from the DECR, was created; this department was responsible for "the implementation of relations with legislative bodies, political parties, professional and creative unions, and other civil society institutions in the canonical territory of the Moscow Patriarchate." Dioceses, representative offices, metochions, monasteries and stavropegic parishes far abroad, which were previously under the authority of the DECR, were directly subordinated to the Patriarch of Moscow of All Russia; to manage them, the Moscow Patriarchate's Secretariat for Institutions Abroad (Note: Since 2010, it is named the Moscow Patriarchate's Administration for Institutions Abroad) was created. The Synodal Information Department was created. The post-graduate department of the Moscow Theological Academy, which operated under the DECR, was transformed into the All-Church postgraduate and doctoral school named after Saints Cyril and Methodius Equal-to-the-Apostles.

On 27 July 2011, the Holy Synod of the Church established the Central Asian Metropolitan District, reorganizing the structure of the Church in Tajikistan, Uzbekistan, Kyrgyzstan and Turkmenistan. Since 6 October 2011, at the request of the Patriarch, the diocesan reform began, in which 2–3 dioceses were created on the territory of one region instead of one with the formation of a metropolis (Russian: митрополия, mitropoliya), administrative structure bringing together neighboring eparchies.

=== Foreign relations ===
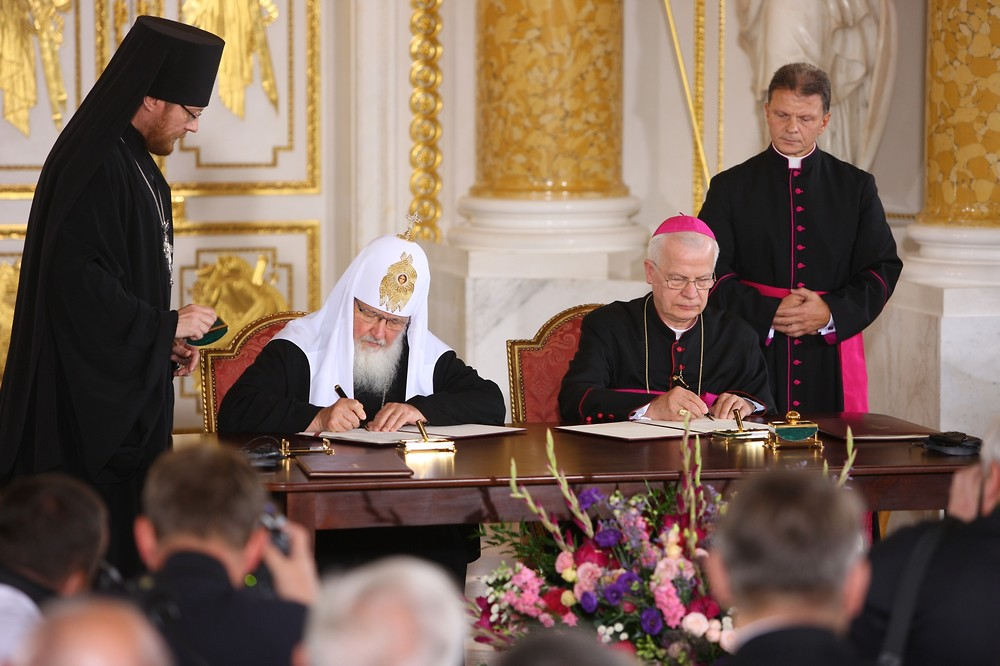
Kirill and archbishop Józef Michalik signing a joint declaration to the Polish and Russian people at the Royal Castle in Warsaw (2012)

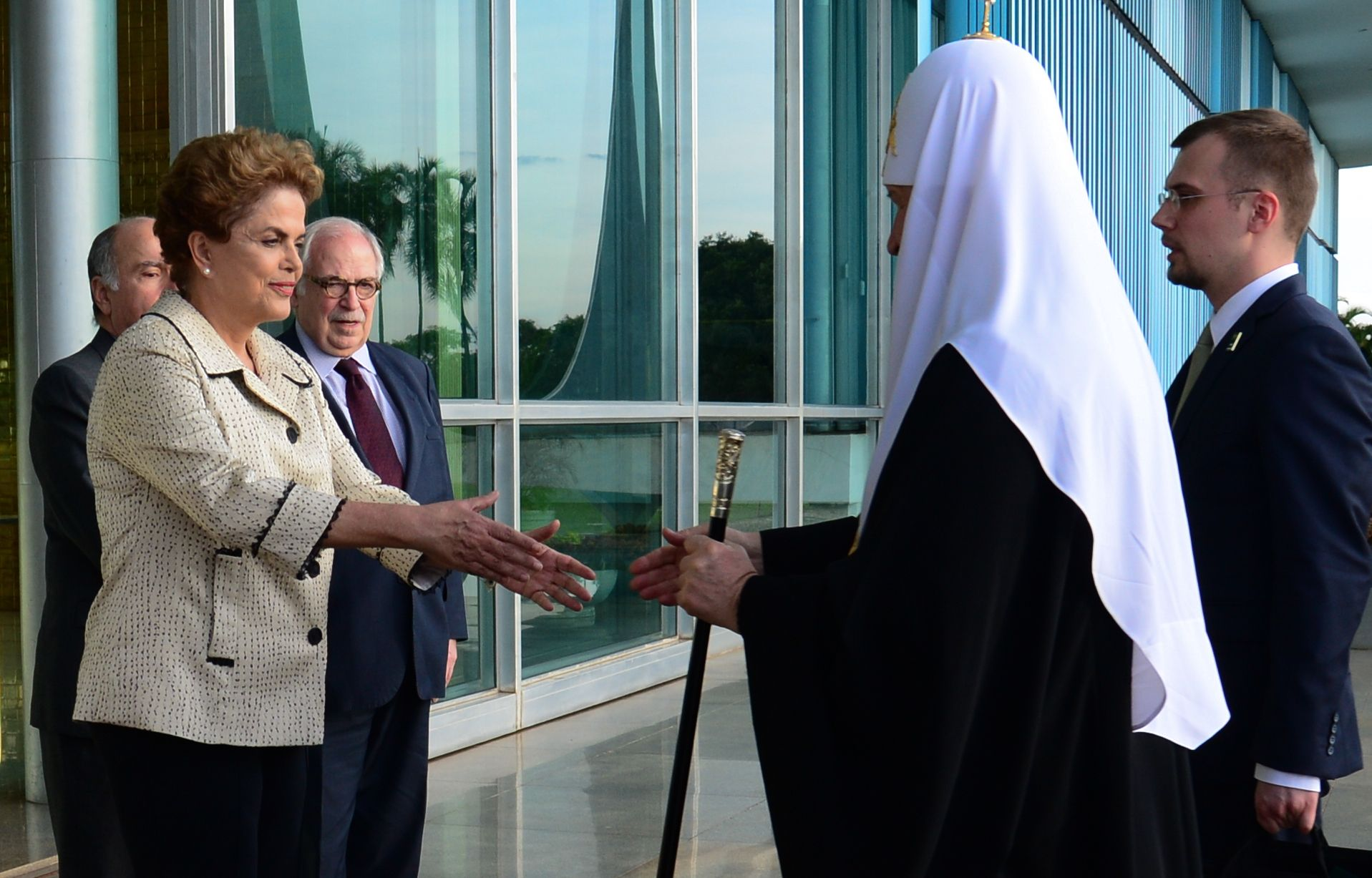
Kirill is greeted by Brazilian President Dilma Rousseff as he arrives at the Alvorada Palace in Brasília, Brazil, 19 February 2016

Kirill "heartily congratulated" Belarusian president Alexander Lukashenko for winning the Belarusian presidency in 2010 in a non-democratic election.

According to the Financial Times, "Keenly aware that Putin's actions severely undermined his authority in Ukraine, Kirill refused to absorb Crimea's parishes and boycotted a ceremony in the Kremlin to celebrate Russia's annexation."

During the Orthodox Church of Ukraine autocephaly controversy, Patriarch Kirill was the presiding chairman of the Holy Synod of the Russian Orthodox Church when the decision was made to break Eucharistic communion with the Ecumenical Patriarchate on 15 October 2018.

In 2019, he created a working committee with the Malankara Orthodox Church.

After Russia invaded Ukraine in 2022, Kirill praised the invasion. Kirill blamed the conflict on "gay parades" and made baseless claims that Ukraine was "exterminating" Russians in Donbass, Kirill's remarks prompted clergy in some other Orthodox dioceses to condemn Kirill's remarks and seek independence from the Moscow church.

=== Relations with Vladimir Putin ===
Kirill is a long-time ally of president Vladimir Putin.

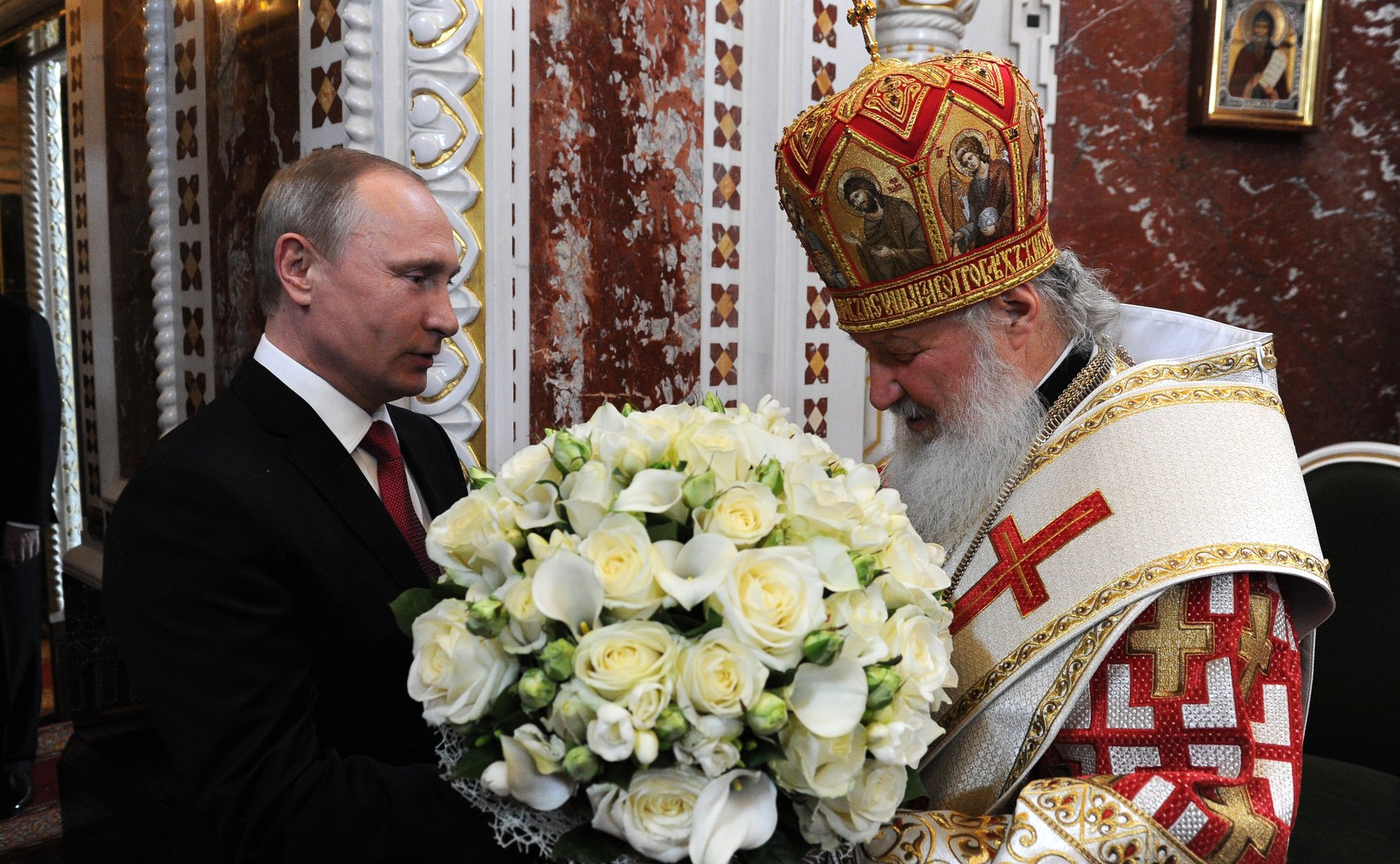
Kirill and Russian President Vladimir Putin on 1 May 2016

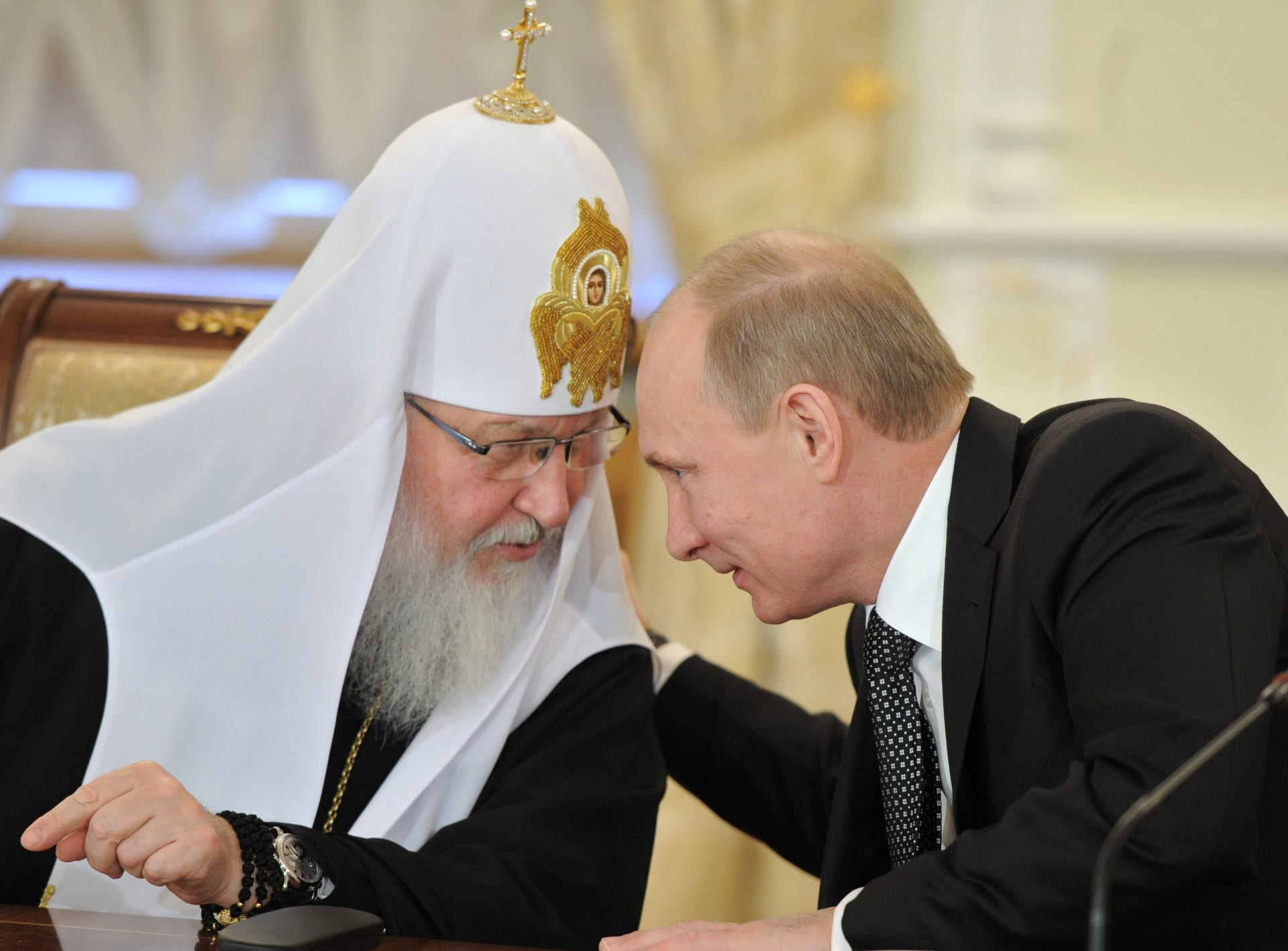
Kirill with Vladimir Putin on 26 November 2022

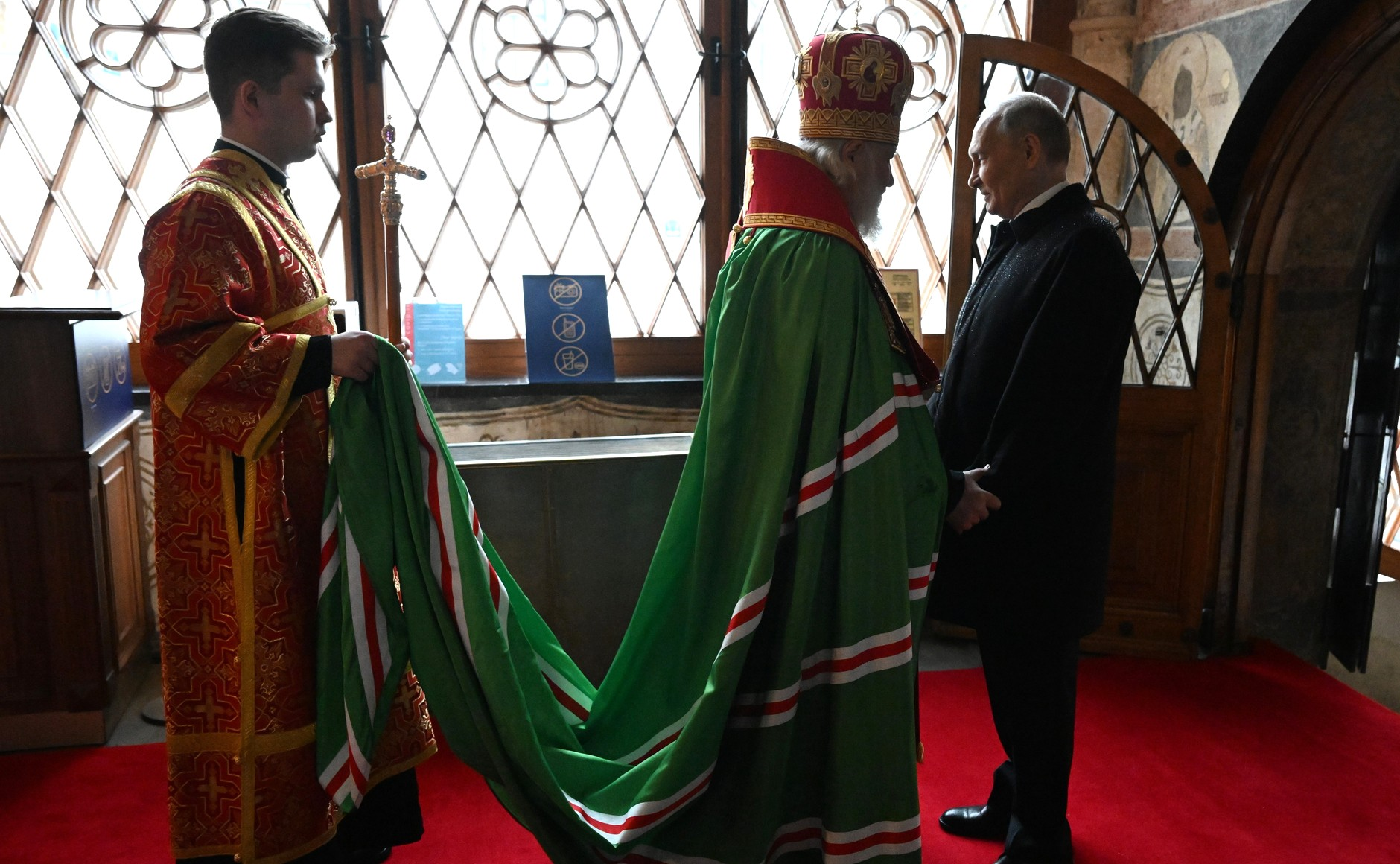
Kirill talking to Putin at the Annunciation Cathedral of the Moscow Kremlin after Putin's fifth inauguration on 7 May 2024

When Kirill was elected Patriarch on 27 January 2009, by the Local Council of the Russian Orthodox Church by secret vote he gained 508 out of 702 votes and was enthroned during a liturgy at the Cathedral of Christ the Saviour, Moscow on 1 February 2009. The service was attended, among others, by the President of Russia, Dmitry Medvedev and by the then prime minister Vladimir Putin.

The following day, Medvedev hosted a reception (a formal banquet) for the ROC bishops in the Grand Kremlin Palace, where Patriarch Kirill spoke of the Byzantine concept of symphonia as his vision of the ideal of church-state relations, though acknowledging that it was not possible to fully attain it in Russia today.

On 8 February 2012, at a meeting of religious leaders in Moscow, Kirill contrasted the economic and social chaos of the 1990s with the 2000s and said "What were the 2000s then? Through a miracle of God, with the active participation of the country's leadership, we managed to exit this horrible, systemic crisis", and likened anti-government protesters' "demands" to "ear-piercing shrieks" and said the protesters represented a minority of Russians."

Since 1970, the federal police of Switzerland had classified him as a KGB agent, under the name "Mikhaïlov".

In cultural and social affairs, the Church under Kirill has collaborated closely with the Russian state under President Vladimir Putin.

Patriarch Kirill has backed the expansion of Russian power into Crimea and eastern Ukraine. Despite calling for the "speedy restoration of peace", Patriarch Kirill also referred to Moscow's opponents in Ukraine as "evil forces", stating "we must not allow dark and hostile external forces to laugh at us."

He has been described as a "committed nationalist of the imperial variety", as someone "who thinks nothing of using the familiar words of a faith to their most egregious effect".

== Public controversies ==
=== Importation of cigarettes ===
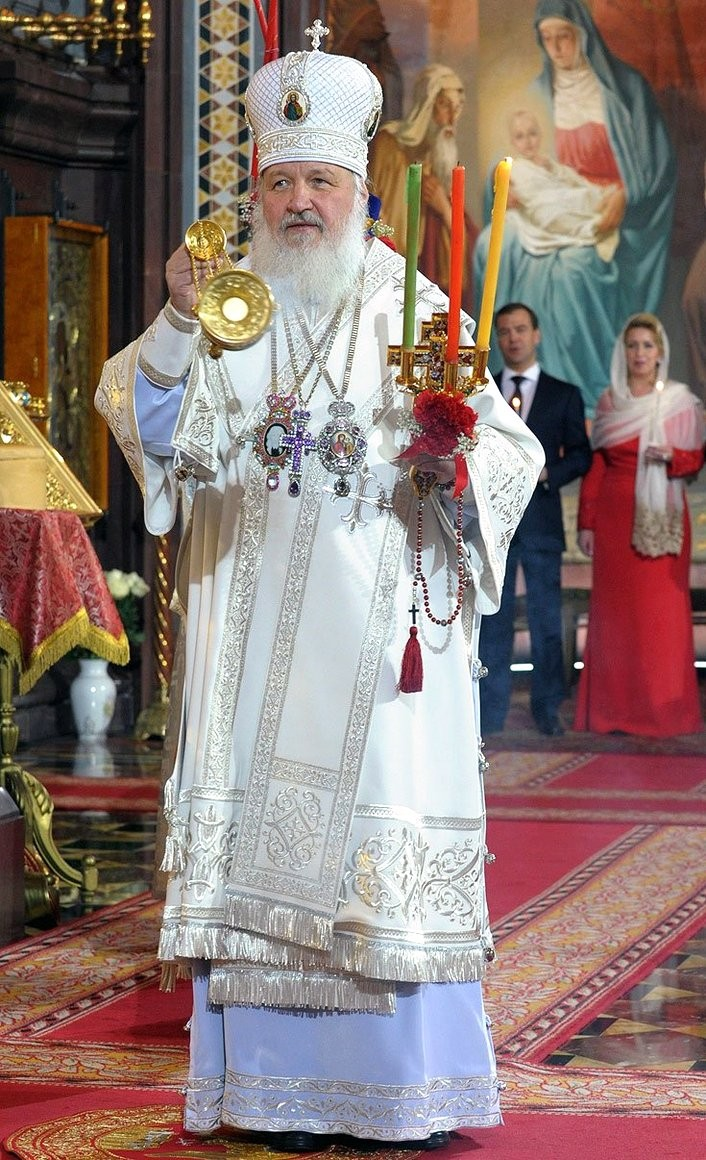
Patriarch Kirill at Easter 2011

Journalists of the newspapers Kommersant and Moskovskij Komsomolets accused Kirill of profiteering and abuse of the privilege of duty-free importation of cigarettes granted to the church in the mid-1990s and dubbed him "Tobacco Metropolitan". The Department for External Church Relations was alleged to have acted as the largest supplier of foreign cigarettes in Russia. The profits of this operation allegedly under Kirill's direction were estimated to have totaled $1.5 billion by sociologist Nikolai Mitrokhin in 2004, and at $4 billion by The Moscow News in 2006. However, Nathaniel Davis said that "There is no evidence that Metropolitan Kirill has actually embezzled funds. What is more likely is that profits from the importation of tobacco and cigarettes have been used for urgent, pressing Church expenses." The duty-free importation of cigarettes ended in 1997. In his 2002 interview with Izvestia, Metropolitan Kirill called the allegations about his profiteering a political campaign against him.

Alexander Pochinok, who was the minister of taxes and levies (1999–2000), said in 2009 that Kirill had no involvement in the violations.

=== Ambition ===
In 2007 Kirill stated his goal of establishing a global Eastern Orthodox movement in Greece, Cyprus, Ukraine, Belarus, various Balkan states, Georgia, Armenia, and Moldova.

=== Electioneering for Putin's 2012 campaign ===
In February 2012 Patriarch Kirill said that Putin's rule is a miracle. He openly supported Putin's presidential bid in 2012 and said that Putin corrected the historically wrong path of Russia after coming to power, and conducted a special prayer ceremony in honor of Putin's re-election twice, on 7 May 2012 and in May 2018.

=== Pussy Riot ===
Three female members of the feminist group Pussy Riot were arrested in March 2012 for performing a song in Christ the Saviour Cathedral in Moscow during which they called on the Virgin Mary to "chase Putin out". The women were arrested for hooliganism and were later sentenced to two years' imprisonment. The song contained profanities and was performed in front of the altar. This act was considered a desecration and offence by many of Orthodox believers in Russia, and depicted as such in media. Commenting on the case, Kirill said they were "doing the work of Satan" and should be punished. This sparked criticism of the Orthodox Church on the Runet for not showing mercy, while Amnesty International described the women as "prisoners of conscience". In their closing statements, members of Pussy Riot said that Patriarch Kirill had used the church to support the cultural position of Putin's government. Polls by Levada Center showed that a majority of Russians thought the punishment of the punk group was excessive, although only six percent of Russians were sympathetic to the group.

Pope Benedict XVI, who was pontiff of the Catholic Church at the time, supported the position of the Russian Orthodox Church on this issue.

=== Dust compensation dispute ===
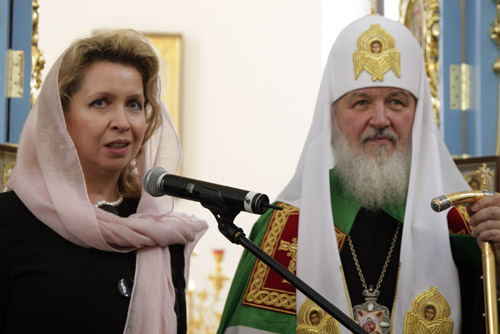
Patriarch Kirill and Svetlana Medvedeva at the church ceremony in Sestroretsk

In March 2012, the former Russian Health Minister (1999–2004) Yury Shevchenko, pursuant to a court ruling, paid about 20 million rubles ($676,000) in compensation for the dust resultant from the renovation work that had settled in a flat upstairs in the prestigious House on the Embankment privately owned by Patriarch Kirill and occupied by the Patriarch's long-time friend businesswoman Lidia Leonova.

"I sold my apartment in St. Petersburg, and we paid the required sum", said Shevchenko's son, also named Yury, in early April 2012.

According to the lawsuit, renovation works in Shevchenko's apartment stirred up a lot of dust, which settled on a collection of valuable books owned by Kirill. The Patriarch confirmed his ownership of the dusty apartment in a private conversation with journalist Vladimir Solovyov.

Most of the reports in the media tended to be critical of Patriarch Kirill and laughing at the claims that the dust was harmful, saying that it was just sand and it would have been far more efficient to just hire a maid to vacuum it up. The Patriarch himself then said he thought it to be inappropriate to forgive Shevchenko.

=== Breguet watch ===
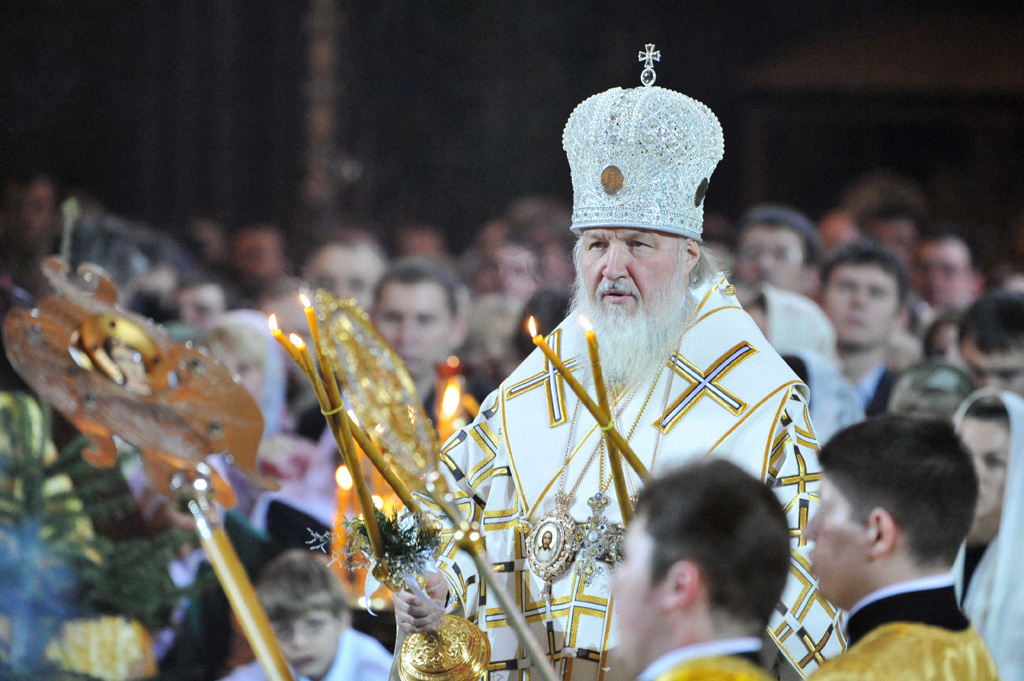
Patriarch Kirill holds a Christmas service at the Cathedral of Christ the Savior, 6 January 2011

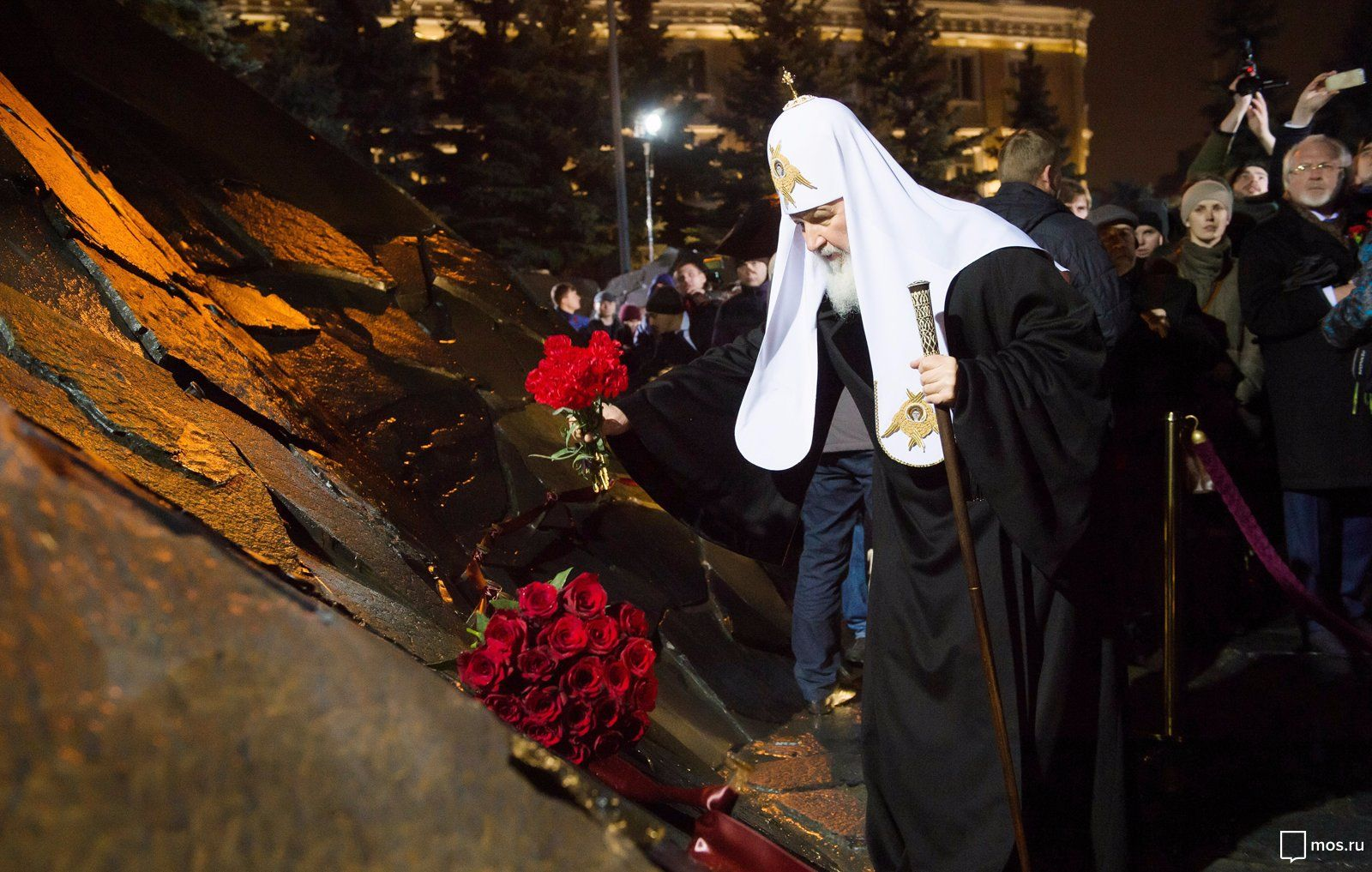
Patriarch Kirill attends a ceremony to unveil the Wall of Grief monument to victims of Stalinist repressions in October 2017.

In 2012, Kirill was accused of wearing a Swiss Breguet watch worth over £20,000 (US$30,000). In an interview with Vladimir Solovyov, Kirill said that he owned a Breguet, among other gifts, but he had never worn it. Concerning a photo which appeared to show him wearing the Breguet at a liturgy, Kirill stated "I was looking at that picture and suddenly I understood - it was a collage! But after that photograph was posted I began examining. As many people come and make presents. And often there are boxes that were never opened and you don't know what is there. And I found out that in fact there is Breguet watch, so I've never given commentaries that the Patriarch doesn't have it. There is a box with Breguet, but I've never worn it." Some time later, photographs on his official website showed him wearing what appeared to be an expensive watch on his left wrist, and later one even showed the watch airbrushed out, but with a reflection of it still visible on the table's glossy surface. Later, it was stated by the Russian Church officials that it was a 24-year-old employee who "acted out of stupid, unjustifiable and unauthorized initiative" in editing the photo. It was also stated that "the guilty ones [for the image manipulation] will be punished severely".

A spokesperson added that it was "unethical" to discuss Kirill's private life, and the Russian Orthodox Church said on 4 April 2012 that foreign forces were taking revenge on it for supporting Putin: "The attacks have become more prominent during the pre-election and post-election period [... This] shows their political and also anti-Russian motives."

In June 2012, Kirill was given the 2011 Silver Shoe Award (given in Russia each year "for the most dubious achievements in show business") for "immaculate disappearance of a watch" in the category "Miracles up to the elbows". The award found a pained reaction from representatives of the Russian Orthodox Church.

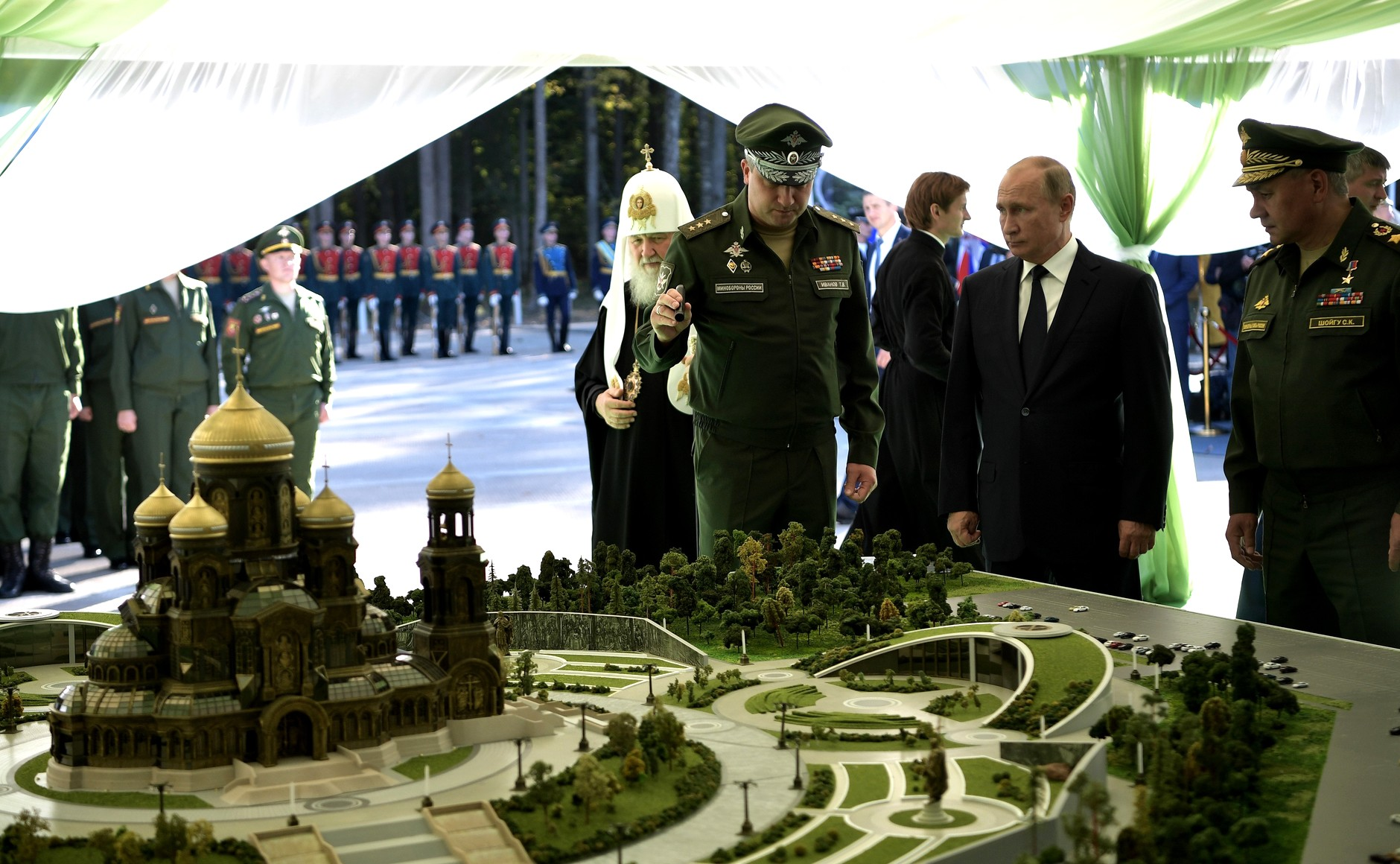
Kirill, Putin, Shoigu and Timur Ivanov at Patriot Park in Kubinka, 19 September 2018

=== Support for Russia's 2015 intervention in Syria ===
In 2015, Kirill's envoy delivered his letter to Russian servicemen at Russia's Khmeimim Air Base in Syria. The letter claimed that Russians troops in Syria are to deliver love and peace with the hope of Jesus Christ's descending to Syria. Kirill also said that Russia's actions in Syria are just.

=== Same-sex marriage ===
In 2016, Kirill stated that silencing priests that speak against same-sex marriage is similar to censorship, such as those that existed under "Soviet totalitarianism". In May 2017, he again likened silencing such priests to totalitarianism seen in Nazi Germany, and referred to same-sex marriage as a threat to family values during a visit to Kyrgyzstan.

=== Rapprochement with the Catholic Church ===
In February 2016 Pope Francis and he held the first-ever meeting between the leaders of the Russian Orthodox and Roman Catholic churches.

=== Statement that Bulgarians should only thank Russia for their liberation ===
During Kirill's visit to Bulgaria in 2018 in honor of the 140th anniversary of Bulgaria's liberation from the Ottoman Empire, Bulgaria's president Rumen Radev said he thanks all ethnicities that were struggling for Bulgaria's independence from the Ottomans as a part of Russia's Imperial Army: Russians, Romanians, Finns, Ukrainians, Belarusians, Poles, Lithuanians, Serbs, Montenegrins.

In response, Kirill criticised the statement and said that Bulgarians should only thank Russia, not anyone else, and that there was no place for "false interpretations of history". Kirill also added that Bulgarians have been known since the Soviet era for being bad speechmakers, who are unable to speak without paper notes.

In turn, Bulgaria's Vice Prime Minister Valeri Simeonov called Kirill a "2nd rate KGB agent", "the Tobacco Metropolitan" (see relevant article: Tobacco scandal) and said Kirill is "not a saint". After a litigation launched by a local Bulgarian pro-Russian activist, a local court found there was no defamation in Simeonov's words.

=== Ban of Jehovah's Witnesses ===
Since the 1990s, Kirill has advocated for banning Jehovah's Witnesses. Under Kirill's leadership, he remained the chief architect behind the ban of 170,000 Jehovah's Witnesses in 2017. On 2 May 2017, the Russian Orthodox Church issued a press release stating, "Russian Orthodox Church supports [the] ban on Jehovah's Witnesses in Russia," and again, on 13 February 2019, it reiterated full support of the ban. Sam Brownback, a U.S. ambassador-at-large for international religious freedom, stated, "You may agree or disagree with their [Jehovah's Witnesses'] ideology, but they are peaceful practitioners of faith, and they are entitled to practice their faith." Since then, the United Nations and others have accused Russia of human rights abuses.

=== KGB affiliation ===
Forbes reported on 20 February 2009 that, "Kirill, who was the Metropolitan of Smolensk, succeeds Alexei II who died in December after 18 years as head of the Russian Church. According to material from the Soviet archives, Kirill was a KGB agent (as was Alexei). This means he was more than just an informer, of whom there were millions in the Soviet Union. He was an active officer of the organization. Neither Kirill nor Alexei ever acknowledged or apologized for their ties with the security agencies."

Further reporting from 7 March 2022 from The Guardian's Emma Graham-Harrison interviewed local Ukrainians for their opinions about Kirill and the Russian Orthodox Church in Ukraine. The response was mostly a pessimistic view of Kirill and his motives towards Ukraine based on his past as a KGB agent:

Like many Ukrainians who no longer trust the Russian-linked churches in their country, Yuri is particularly wary of the Moscow Patriarch, Kirill, who according to material from Soviet archives was a government agent before the fall of the USSR. "Kirill is a KGB guy, and he supports all aggression against Ukraine," he said, but asked not to give his last name, worried like many in the town about community tensions about the church. "He's a bastard, not a religious leader."

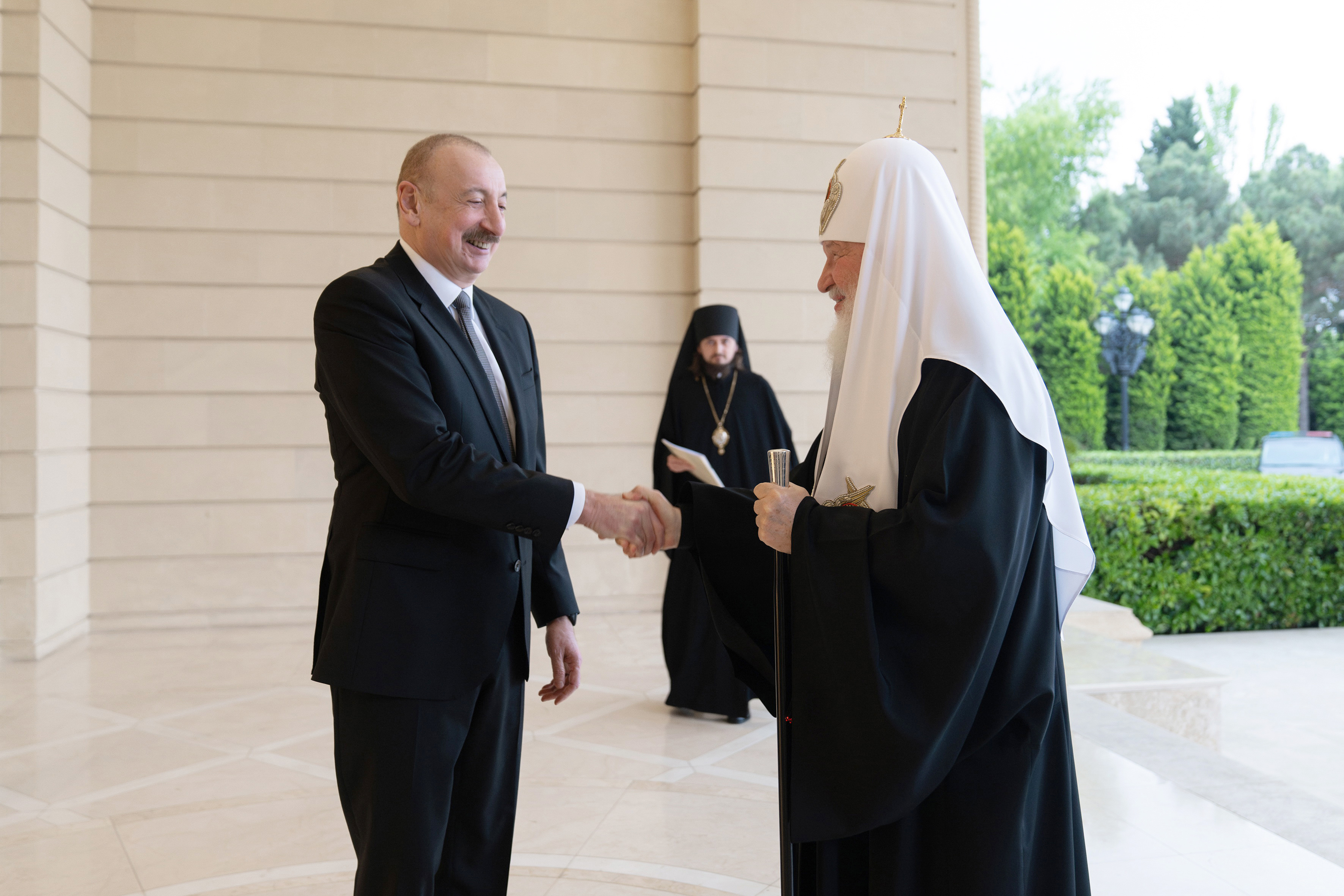
Patriarch Kirill with Azerbaijan's President Ilham Aliyev in Baku, 3 May 2025

=== Statement about the tragedy of existence of post-Soviet states ===
In his sermon on 28 May 2022, Kirill stated that Vladimir Lenin had "tragically" dismembered "the historical Russia" into different countries, signing decrees destroying the country, which was a terrible decision that still leads to consequences even today.

=== Ukraine ===
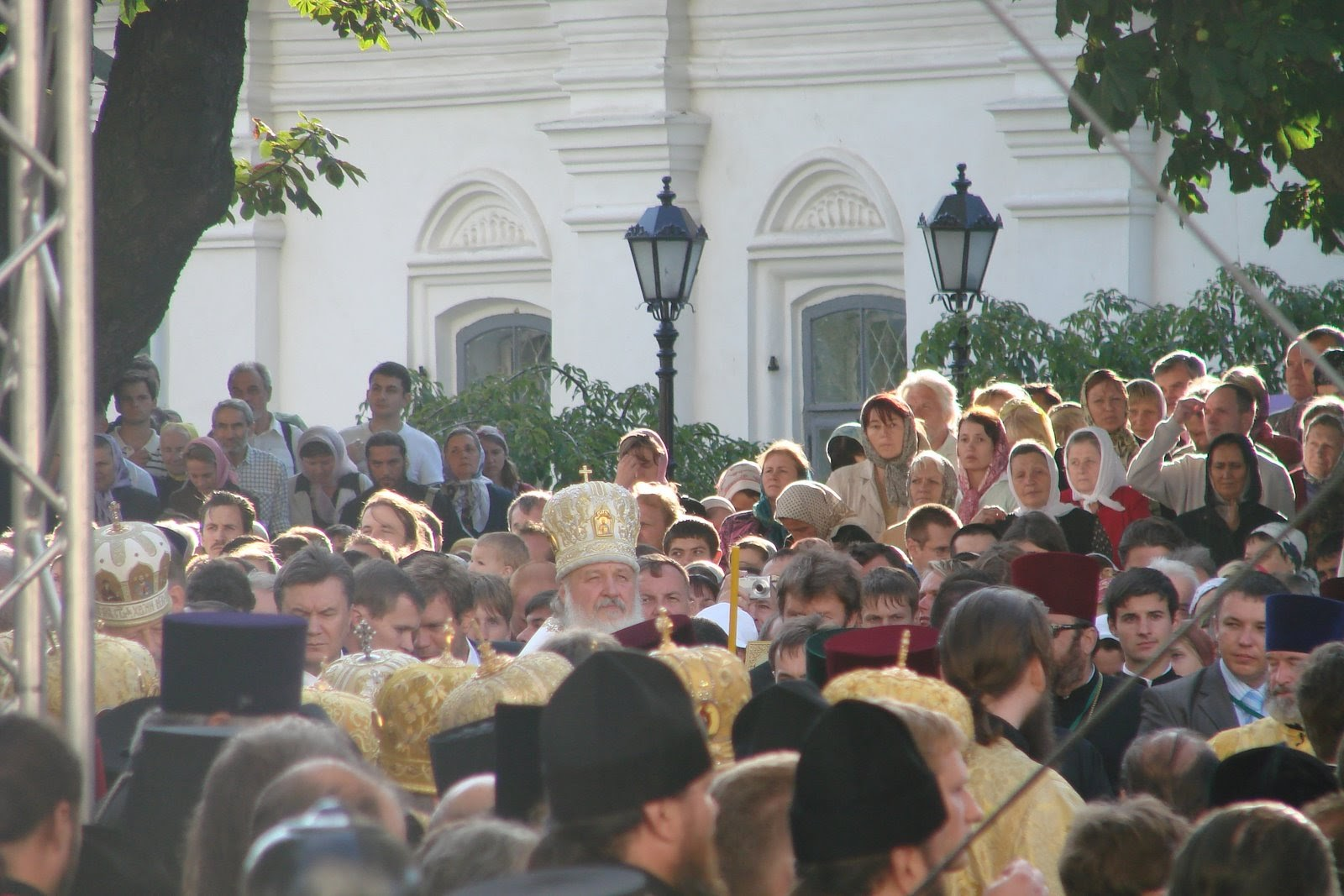
Patriarch Kirill is welcomed in Kyiv, Ukraine, in 2009.

==== Positions regarding Ukraine and Ukrainians prior to the Russian invasion of Ukraine ====
On 18 July 2014, despite Russia's intervention in Donbas and Russia's occupation of Crimea (during which Putin, according to his own statement, threatened to use nuclear weapons in case of resistance to the Russians), Kirill said that Russia poses no military threat to anyone.

On the same day, Putin stated that he wants to involve Patriarch Kirill as a negotiator for the peace process in Ukraine.

On 14 August 2014, in an address to the heads of other Orthodox churches, Patriarch Kirill stated that the anti-terrorist operation in Eastern Ukraine is a war to eradicate Orthodoxy, waged by Catholics and Ukrainian Orthodox Autocephalists, whom he called "schismatics".

On 25 December 2017, according to the website of Russia's administration of Crimea, Patriarch Kirill by his decree awarded the head of the Russian administration of Crimea Sergey Aksyonov and the head of the Russian "State Council of Crimea" Volodymyr Kostiantynov (both contributed to the occupation of Crimea and are wanted in Ukraine on charges of committing actions aimed at seizing power by force, subverting the constitutional order and Ukraine's territorial integrity, and charges of committing treason against the state and creating a criminal organization) with two church awards, respectively, the Order of St. Prince Daniel of Moscow of the 2nd rank and the Order of St. Seraphim of Sarov of the 2nd rank.

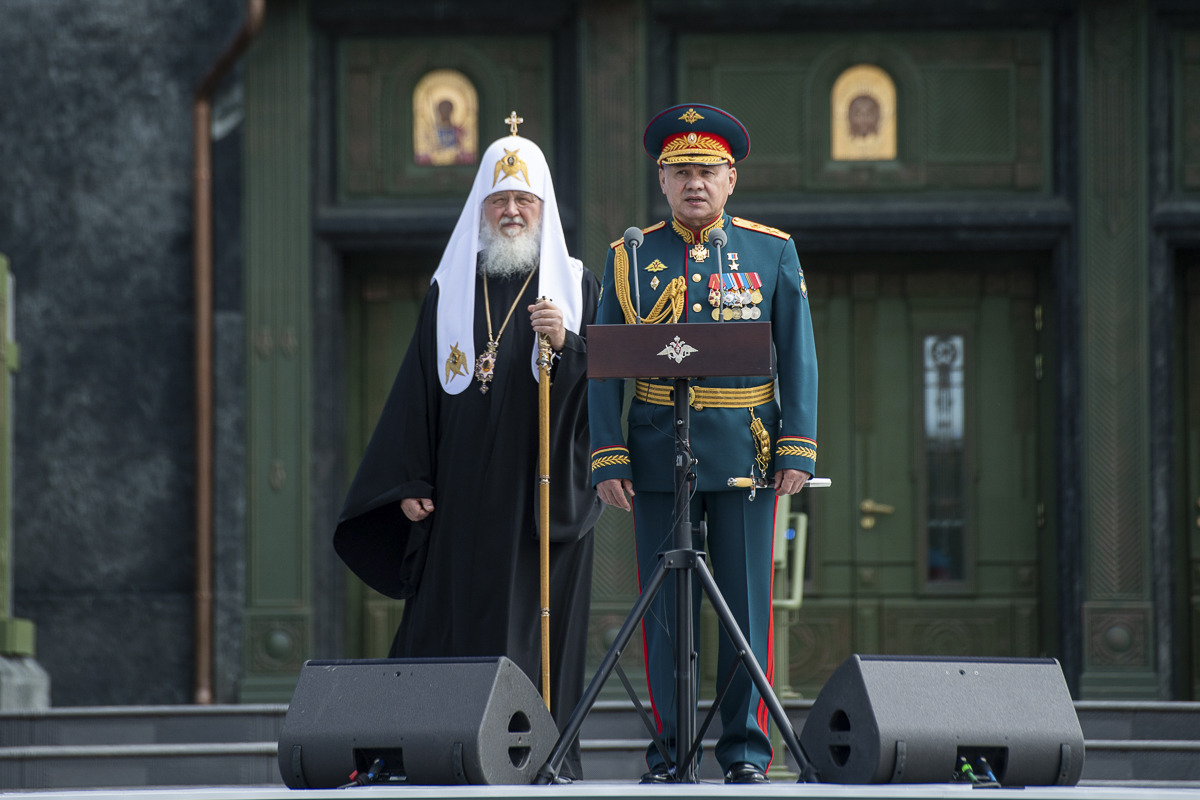
Kirill with Russian Defence Minister Sergei Shoigu on 14 June 2020

In May 2019, Patriarch Kirill said that the people who set ablaze the Odesa Trade Unions House "were possessed of the Devil", but didn't condemn Odesa anti-Maidan activists who had killed two Maidan activists, Igor Ivanov and Andrei Biryukov, on the same day earlier.

During the vote on amendments to Russia's constitution, Kirill called upon Russians to support the amendments. While he explicitly mentioned a single amendment, the one that adds the mention of faith in God, saying that even atheists should vote for it, the voting itself was actually about the entire set of amendments, with people voting on all amendments at once, instead of voting on each amendment individually, one-by-one. Among the amendments was the amendment to protect Russia's territorial integrity, which prohibits negotiations on the transfer of Russia's territories to other countries.

On 15 October 2021, at the opening of the VII Congress of Russian Compatriots in Moscow, he accused the West of trying to impose "false narratives" about World War II, stating the need to "protect" compatriots and Russians from Russia around the world, and said that not only do parishes of The Moscow Patriarchate unite Russians, Ukrainians and Belarusians through religion, but also through Russian language. Kirill urged families of these peoples to teach their own children to love their "historical homeland" Russia and to raise their children as Russophones.

==== Support for the Russian invasion of Ukraine ====
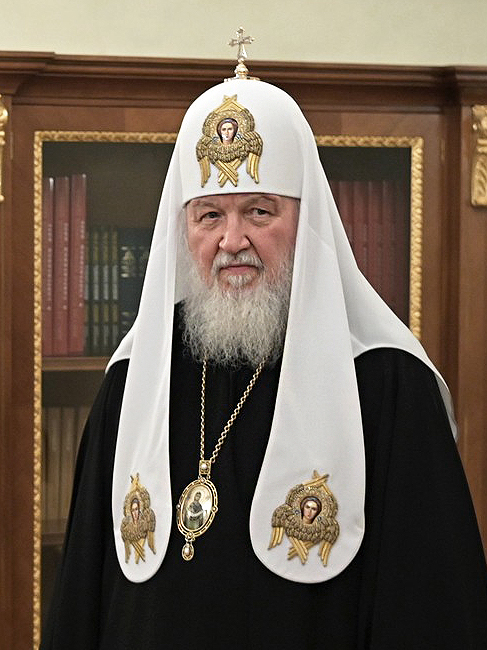
"We do not want to fight with anyone. Russia has never attacked anyone. It is surprising that a large and powerful country has never attacked anyone, it has only defended its borders."

Patriarch Kirill has referred to the Russian invasion of Ukraine as "current events" and has avoided using terms like war or invasion, thereby complying with Russian censorship law. Kirill approves of the invasion, and has blessed the Russian soldiers fighting there. As a consequence, several priests of the Russian Orthodox Church in Ukraine have stopped mentioning Kirill's name during the divine service. The Moscow patriarchate views Ukraine as a part of their "canonical territory". Kirill has said that the Russian army has chosen a very correct way.

Kirill sees gay pride parades as a part of the reason behind Russian warfare against Ukraine. He has said that the war is not physically, but rather metaphysically, important.

In the days after the world learned about the 2022 Bucha massacre by Russian invaders of Ukraine, Kirill said that his faithful should be ready to "protect our home" under any circumstance.

On 6 March 2022 (Forgiveness Sunday holiday), during the liturgy in the Church of Christ the Savior, he justified Russia's attack on Ukraine, stating that it was necessary to side with "Donbas" (i.e. Donetsk and Luhansk People's Republic), where he said there is an ongoing 8-year "genocide" by Ukraine and where, Kirill said, Ukraine wants to enforce gay pride events upon the local population. Despite the holiday being dedicated to the concept of forgiveness, Kirill said there can't be forgiveness without delivering "justice" first, otherwise it's a capitulation and weakness. The speech came under international scrutiny, as Kirill reiterated President Putin's claim that Russia was fighting "fascism" in Ukraine. Throughout the speech, Kirill did not use the term "Ukrainian", but rather referred to both Russians and Ukrainians simply as "Holy Russians", also claiming Russian soldiers in Ukraine were "laying down their lives for a friend", referencing the Gospel of John.

On 9 March 2022, after the liturgy, he declared that Russia has the right to use force against Ukraine to ensure Russia's security, that Ukrainians and Russians are one people, that Russia and Ukraine are one country, that the West incites Ukrainians to kill Russians to sow discord between Russians and Ukrainians and gives weapons to Ukrainians for this specific purpose, and therefore the West is an enemy of Russia and God.

In a letter to the World Council of Churches (WCC) sent in March 2022, Kirill justified the attack on Ukraine by NATO enlargement, the protection of Russian language, and the establishment of the Orthodox Church of Ukraine. In this letter, he did not express condolences over deaths among Ukrainians.

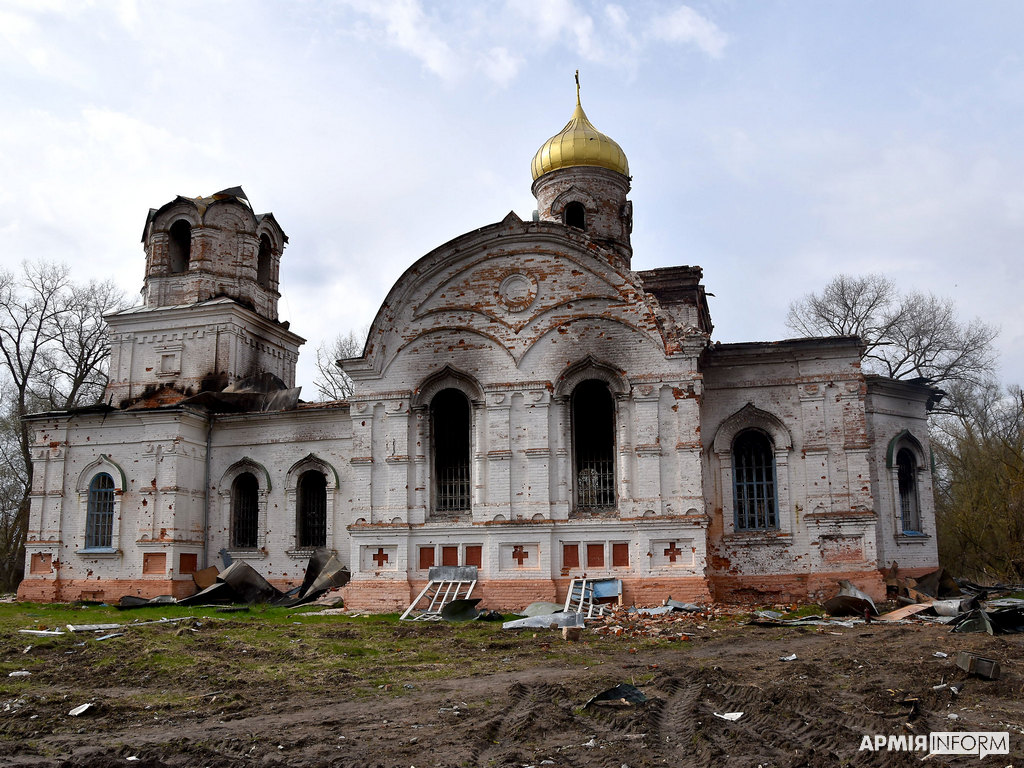
Church of the Ascension in Lukashivka village (Chernihiv Oblast of Ukraine) after fighting in April 2022

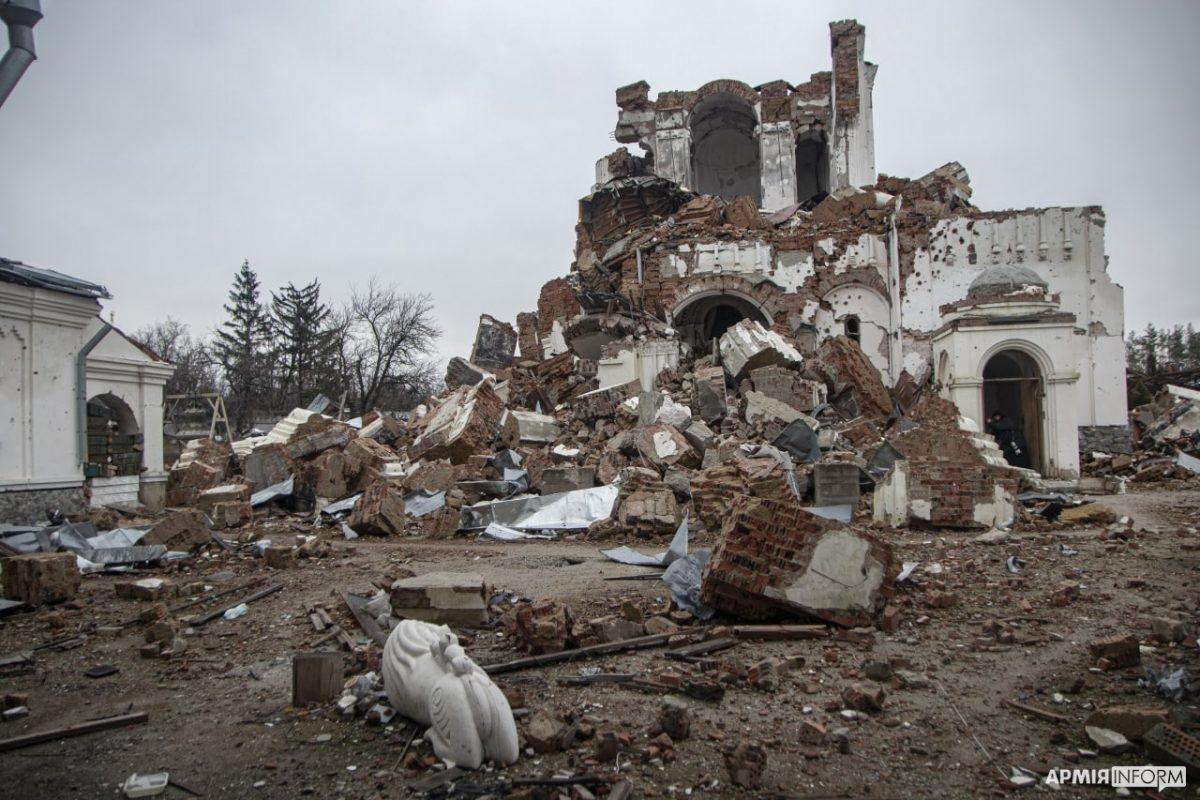
St. George's church in the Sviatohirsk Lavra complex after Russian shelling in May 2022

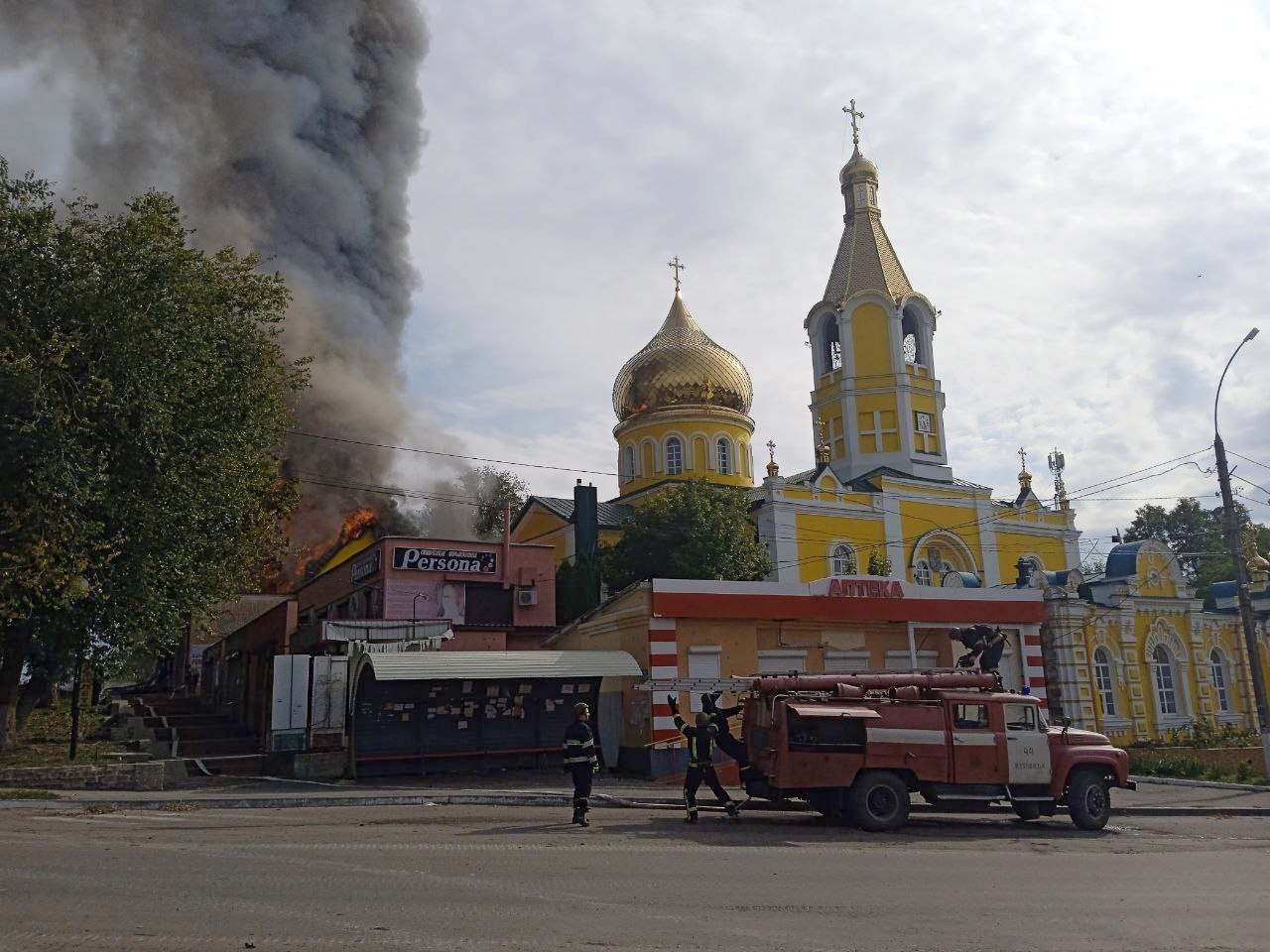
Saint Nicholas Orthodox Church in Kupiansk, Ukraine, after Russian shelling on 26 September 2022

Kirill participated in a Zoom video call with Pope Francis on 16 March 2022, of which Francis stated in an interview that Kirill "read from a piece of paper he was holding in his hand all the reasons that justify the Russian invasion."

On 27 March 2022, Kirill expressed his support for the actions of Rosgvardiya in Ukraine, praising its fighters for performing their military duty, and wished them God's help in this matter.

In the aftermath of the Bucha massacre on 3 April, Kirill, speaking in the Main Cathedral of the Russian Armed Forces, praised the armed forces for "feats" of service, saying Russia is "peaceful".

Representatives of the Vatican have criticized Kirill for his lack of willingness to seek peace in Ukraine. On 3 April, the former Archbishop of Canterbury Rowan Williams said there was a strong case for expelling the Russian Orthodox Church from the WCC, saying, "When a Church is actively supporting a war of aggression, failing to condemn nakedly obvious breaches of any kind of ethical conduct in wartime, then other Churches do have the right to raise the question ... I am still waiting for any senior member of the Orthodox hierarchy to say that the slaughter of the innocent is condemned unequivocally by all forms of Christianity."

The Russian Orthodox St Nicholas church in Amsterdam has declared that it is no longer possible to function within the Moscow patriarchate because of the attitude that Kirill has taken to the Russian invasion, and instead requested to join the Ecumenical Patriarchate of Constantinople. The Russian Orthodox Church in Lithuania has declared that they do not share the political views and perception of Kirill and therefore are seeking independence from Moscow.

On 10 April 2022, 200 priests from the Ukrainian Orthodox Church (Moscow Patriarchate) released an open request to the primates of the other autocephalous Eastern Orthodox Churches, asking them to convene a Council of Primates of the Ancient Eastern Churches at the Pan-Orthodox level and try Kirill for the heresy of preaching the "Doctrine of the Russian world" and the moral crimes of "blessing the war against Ukraine and fully supporting the aggressive nature of Russian troops on the territory of Ukraine." They noted that they "can't continue to remain in any form of canonical subordination to the Moscow Patriarch," and requested that the Council of Primates "bring Patriarch Kirill to justice and deprive him of the right to hold the patriarchal throne."

On 23 May 2022, Kirill stated that Russian schoolchildren must take Russian troops fighting against Ukraine as an example of heroic behaviour.

When the Ukrainian Orthodox Church (Moscow Patriarchate) removed itself from the Moscow Patriarchate on 27 May 2022, Kirill claimed that the "spirits of malice" wanted to separate the Russian and Ukrainian peoples but that "they will not succeed". The Ukrainian church released a declaration in which it stated "it had adopted relevant additions and changes to the Statute on the Administration of the Ukrainian Orthodox Church, which testify to the complete autonomy and independence of the Ukrainian Orthodox Church." The church did not publish its new constitution. Although in this Ukrainian Orthodox Church clergymen now claims that 'any provisions that at least somehow hinted at or indicated the connection with Moscow were excluded,' the Russian Orthodox Church ignores this and continues to include UOC-MP clerics in its various commissions or working groups despite these individuals not agreeing to this nor even wanting to be included.

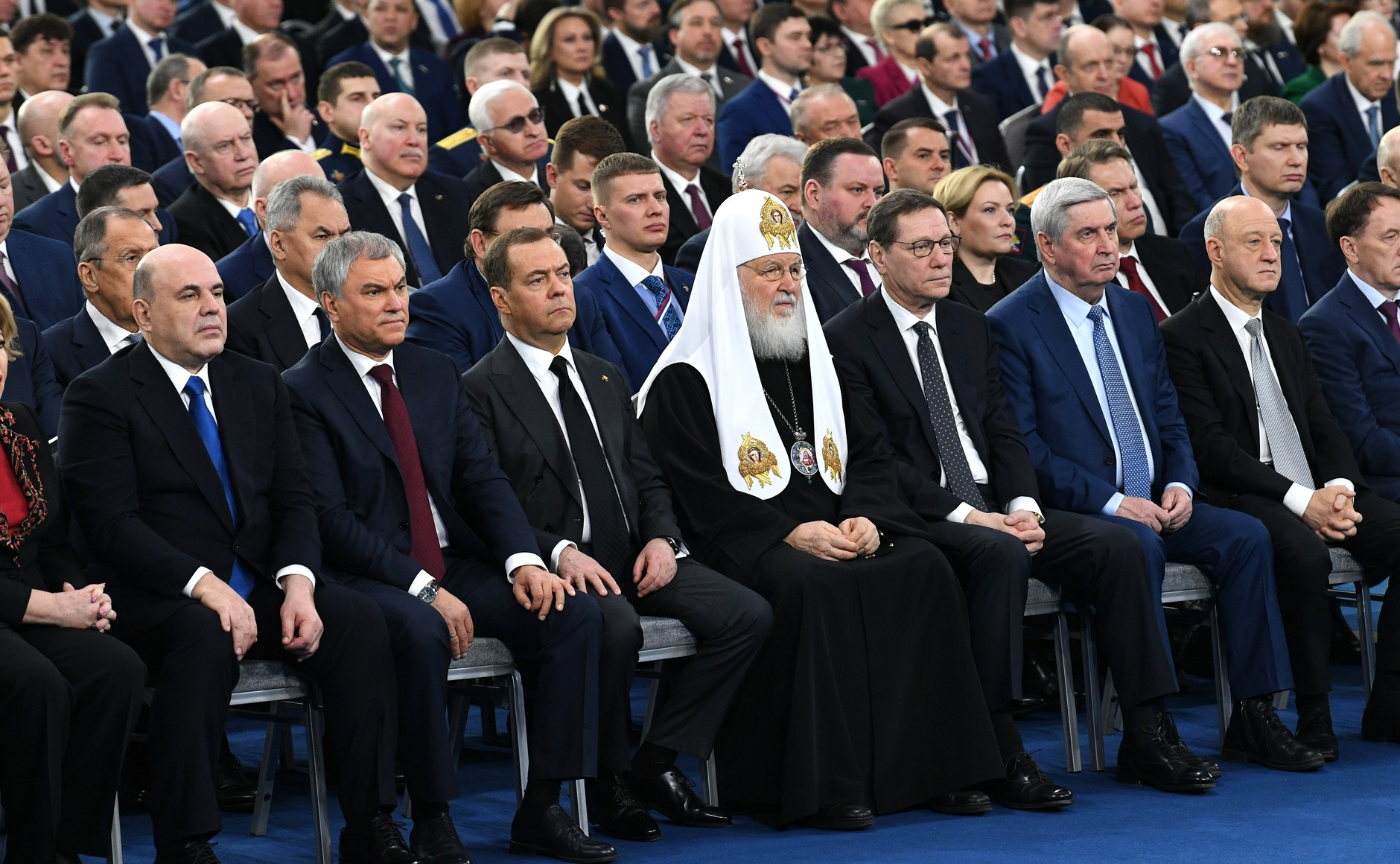
Kirill with Mishustin, Volodin, Medvedev and other prominent figures during Putin's Presidential Address to the Federal Assembly on 21 February 2023

Cardinal Kurt Koch, president of the Pontifical Council for Promoting Christian Unity, said that the patriarch's legitimization of the "brutal and absurd war" is "a heresy".

Kirill supported the mobilization of citizens to go to the front in Ukraine, he urged citizens to fulfill their military duty and that if they gave their lives for their country they will be with God in his kingdom.

On 5 January 2023, Patriarch Kirill released a statement: "I, Kirill, Patriarch of Moscow and of all Rus, appeal to all parties involved in the internecine conflict with a call to cease fire and establish a Christmas truce from 12:00 on January 6 to 00:00 on January 7 so that Orthodox people can attend services on Christmas Eve and on the day of the Nativity of Christ," through the Church's official website.

On 26 February 2023, he proclaimed his support for annexing Donbass, saying it belongs to Russia.

On 27 March 2024, World Russian People's Council led by Kirill, published a declaration in support of Russia's war in Ukraine. It characterized the conflict as a "Holy War", stating: “from a spiritual and moral point of view, the special military operation is a Holy War, in which Russia and its people, are defending the single spiritual space of Holy Russia.” The goal of military operation was claimed to be: "protecting the world from the onslaught of globalism and the victory of the West, which has fallen into Satanism." The document stated that the entire territory of Ukraine should become "zone of Russia’s exclusive influence".

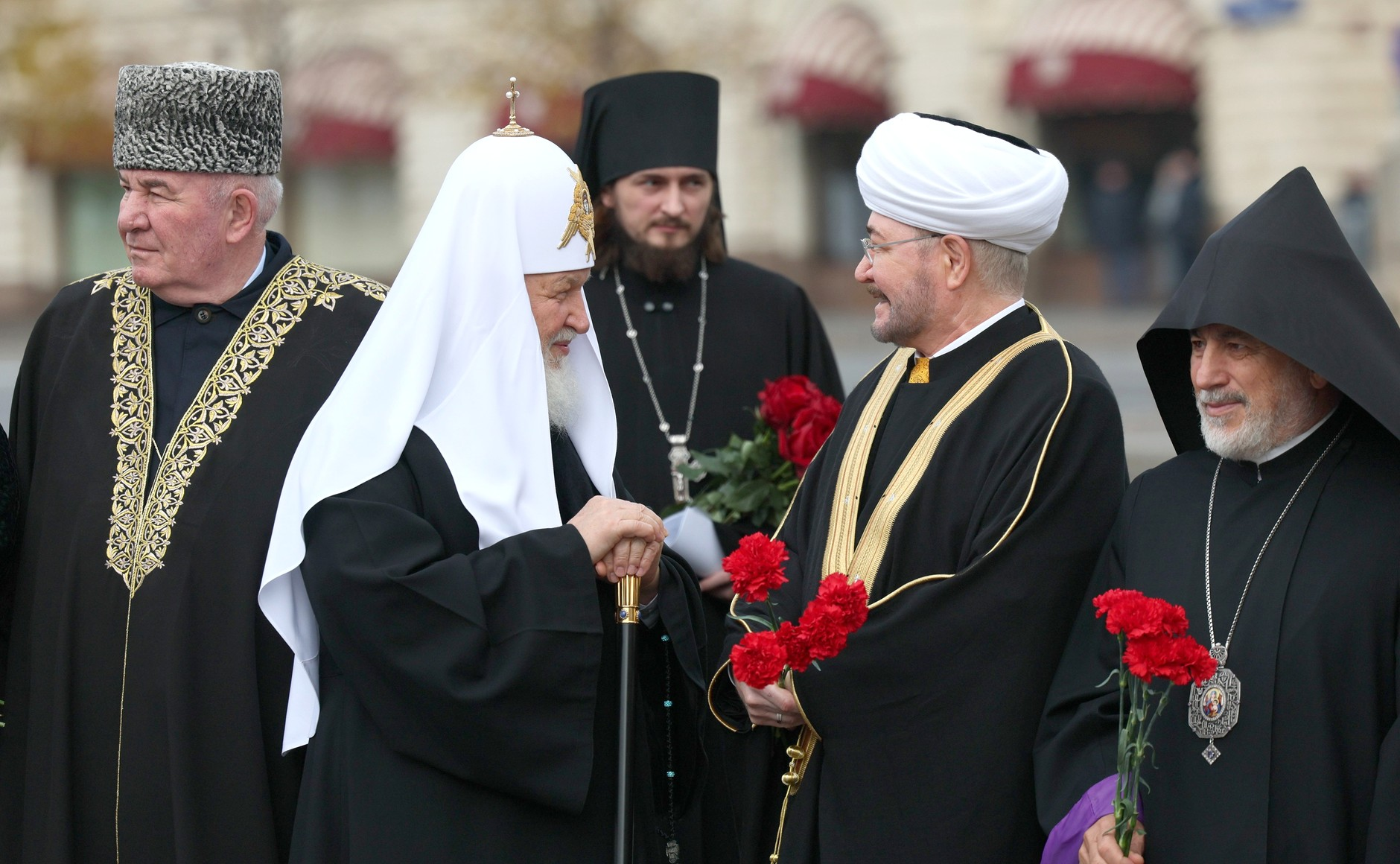
Kirill with North Caucasus mufti Ismail Berdiyev and other pro-Kremlin religious leaders on 4 November 2023

==== Sanctions ====
On 9 April 2015, at a meeting with Greek Prime Minister Alexis Tsipras, Patriarch Kirill thanked him for his geopolitical support he had given to Russia with Kirill calling the sanctions imposed on Russia for the occupation of Crimea and the aggression in Donbas "illegal and unfair".

On 4 May 2022, Kirill was included in a list of 58 entities proposed for sanctions by the European Commission in relation to the invasion of Ukraine, according to Agence France-Presse. However, later reports stated that he was removed from the list following intervention by the Hungarian government.

Kirill was sanctioned earlier in 2022 by Canada, Ukraine and the United Kingdom, the latter saying that "Patriarch Kirill has made multiple public statements in support of the Russian invasion of Ukraine. He therefore engages in, provides support for, or promotes any policy or action which destabilizes Ukraine or undermines or threatens the territorial integrity, sovereignty or independence of Ukraine."

Kirill was sanctioned also by the Czech Republic in May 2023.

== Criticism ==
An open letter of concern was addressed by a number of significant clerics to the Orthodox Christian faithful in the aftermath of the Russian invasion of Ukraine. It read in part:

The speeches of President Vladimir Putin and Patriarch Kirill (Gundiaev) of Moscow (Moscow Patriarchate) have repeatedly invoked and developed Russian world ideology over the last 20 years. In 2014, when Russia annexed the Crimea and initiated a proxy war in the Donbas area of Ukraine, right up until the beginning of the full-fledged war against Ukraine and afterwards, Putin and Patriarch Kirill have used Russian world ideology as a principal justification for the invasion. The teaching states that there is a transnational Russian sphere or civilization, called Holy Russia, or Holy Rus', which includes Russia, Ukraine, and Belarus (and sometimes Moldova and Kazakhstan), as well as ethnic Russians and Russian-speaking people throughout the world. It holds that this "Russian world" has a common political centre (Moscow), a common spiritual centre (Kyiv as the "mother of all Rus"), a common language (Russian), a common church (the Russian Orthodox Church, Moscow Patriarchate), and a common patriarch (the Patriarch of Moscow), who works in 'symphony' with a common president/national leader (Putin) to govern this Russian world, as well as upholding a common distinctive spirituality, morality, and culture.

— A Declaration on the "Russian World" (Russkii mir) Teaching (2022)

On 21 January 2023, imprisoned Moscow councillor Alexei Gorinov, who was sentenced to 7 years in prison for speaking out against the invasion of Ukraine, wrote a letter to Patriarch Kirill, asking him how the teachings of Jesus Christ can be compatible with a war of aggression and for what Christian values are people being killed in Ukraine.

== Personal life ==
=== Wealth ===
According to a Forbes article in 2006, Kirill's wealth was $4 billion, and a 2019 Novaya Gazeta report estimated his worth at $4 billion to $8 billion, although the figures have not been verified. According to a 2020 investigation by Proekt, Kirill and two of his second cousins owned nine separate pieces of real estate worth $2.87 million in the Moscow Region and St. Petersburg.

In 2009, Kirill was photographed wearing a $30,000 gold Breguet watch. Officials associated with the Moscow Patriarchate airbrushed the watch (but not its reflection on the table at which Kirill was sitting) out of the photo, while Kirill claimed that the watch had been doctored into the image. Kirill later admitted that he did in fact own the watch.

=== Unofficial spouse ===
In December 2025, the independent Russian media organization Proekt published an investigative report describing Lidia Leonova as Kirill's secret spouse of nearly 50 years. In 2012, Leonova had surfaced in the news as the occupant of one of Kirill's apartments during a court case. In 2020, Meduza among others had referred to Leonova as Kirill's second cousin.

== Honours and awards ==
=== Church awards ===
Russian Orthodox Church

- Order of St. Prince Vladimir 2nd class (16 September 1973)
- Order of St. Sergius of Radonezh, 1st and 2nd class
- Order of the Holy Prince Daniel of Moscow, 1st class
- Order of St. Innocent Metropolitan of Moscow and Kolomna, 2nd class
- Order of St. Alexis the Metropolitan of Moscow and All Russia, 2nd class
- Named Panagia (1988) – for active participation in the preparation and conduct of the Jubilee celebrations of the 1000th anniversary of Christianity in Russia
- Order of Saint Anthony and Theodosius of the Caves, 1st class (UOC-MP, 2006)
- Order of Saint Stephen the Great pious governor, 2nd class (Orthodox Church of Moldova, 2006) – in recognition of diligent service, and the glory of the Orthodox Church in Moldova
- Silver Jubilee Medal of St. Apostle Peter (St. Petersburg diocese, 2003)
- Order in honour of the 450th anniversary of bringing the land Pochayiv Volyn icons (UOC-MP, 2009)
- Order of St. Theodosius of Chernigov (Ukrainian Orthodox Church, 2011)

Awards of local orthodox churches

- Order of Alexandria, Antioch, Jerusalem, Georgian, Serbian, Bulgarian, Hellenic, Poland, the Czech Lands and Slovakia, Finland and America.
- Order of the Holy Apostles Peter and Paul, I degree (Antiochian Orthodox Church, 2011)
- Gold Medal of St. Innocent (2009, The Orthodox Church in America)

Awards of other churches and denominations

- The Order of St. Gregory of Parumala (Malankara Orthodox Syrian Church, India, 2006)
- Order of St. Gregory the Illuminator (Armenian Apostolic Church, Armenia, 2010)
- Order "Sheikh ul-Islam" (Caucasian Muslims Office, 2011)

=== Awards of the Russian Federation ===
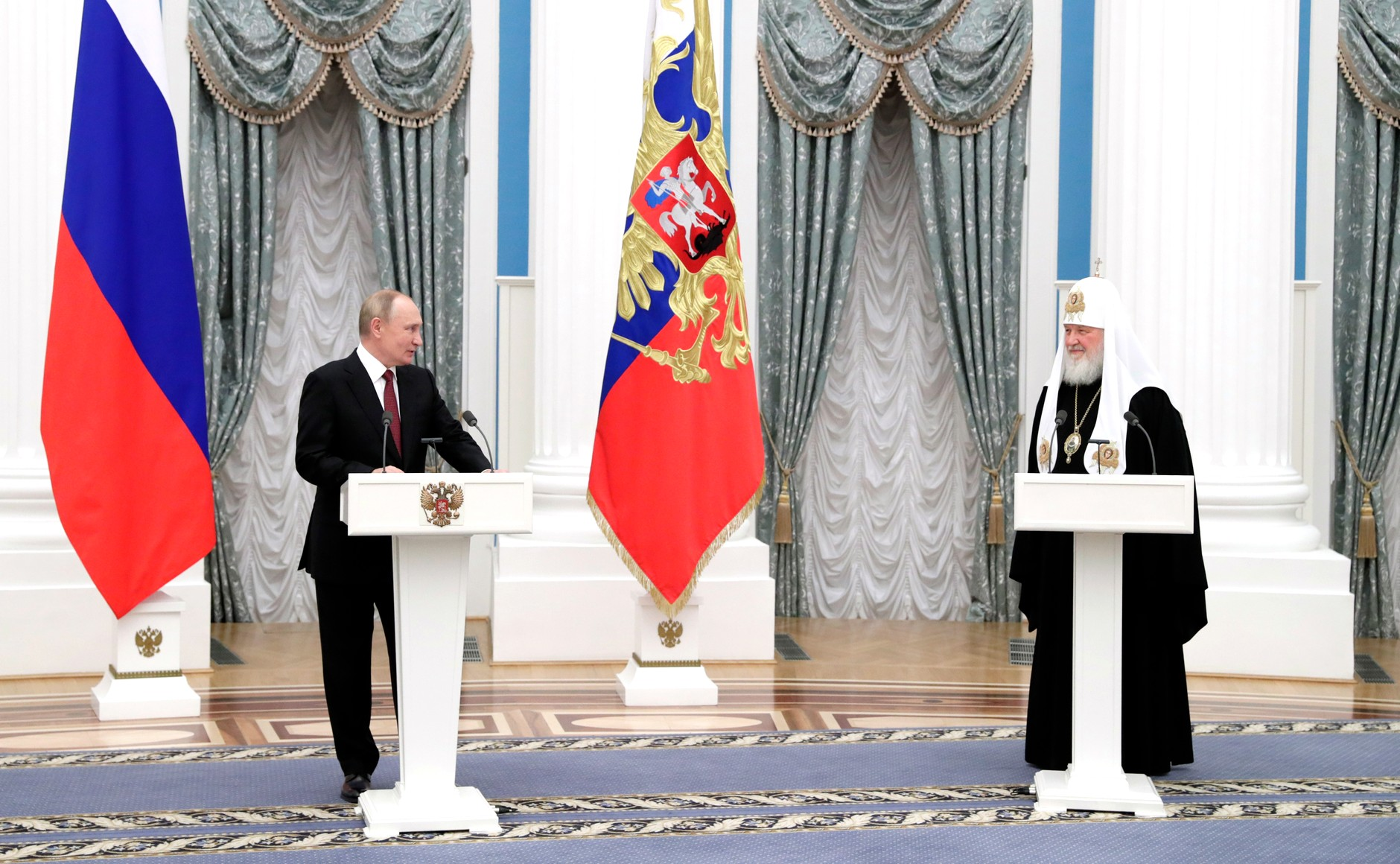
Russian President Putin with Patriarch Kirill during the ceremony of awarding the Order of St. Andrew, 20 November 2021

- Order of Merit for the Fatherland;
  - 2nd class (20 November 2006) – for his great personal contribution to the spiritual and cultural traditions and strengthening friendship between peoples
  - 3rd class (11 August 2000) – for outstanding contribution to the strengthening of civil peace and the revival of spiritual and moral traditions
- Order of Alexander Nevsky (7 January 2011) – for outstanding personal contribution to the Motherland in the preservation of spiritual and cultural traditions
- Order of Friendship (28 December 1995) – for services to the state, the progress made in implementing a comprehensive program of construction, reconstruction and restoration of historic and cultural sites in Moscow
- Order of Friendship of Peoples (1988)
- Medal "50 Years of Victory in Great Patriotic War of 1941–1945."
- Jubilee Medal "300th Anniversary of Russian Navy" (1996)
- Medal "In Commemoration of the 850th Anniversary of Moscow" (1997)
- Gratitude of the President of the Russian Federation (14 August 1995) – for active participation in the preparation and conduct of the 50th anniversary of Victory in Great Patriotic War of 1941–1945
- Diploma of the State Duma of the Russian Federation (2001)

=== Foreign awards ===
- Order of Honour (Azerbaijan 2010)
- Order of the Republic (Moldova, 2011)
- Medal "65th anniversary of Victory in Great Patriotic War" (Transnistria, 2010)
- Order of the Republic of Serbia (2021)

=== Honorary citizenships ===
Lukoyanovsky District of Nizhny Novgorod Oblast (2000), Smolensk Oblast (5 February 2009), Kaliningrad Oblast (5 March 2009), Kemerovo Oblast (2010), Smolensk (2003), the selo of Rizskoye of Smolensk Oblast (2004), Neman of Kaliningrad Oblast (2006), Vyazemsky District of Smolensk Oblast (2006), Kaliningrad (2006), Khoroshyovo-Mnyovniki District of Moscow (2006), Republic of Mordovia (2011 – for outstanding contribution to the preservation and development of domestic spiritual and moral traditions, strengthening of interaction of church and state).

== See also ==
- List of metropolitans and patriarchs of Moscow
- Vsevolod Chaplin

== Notes ==
Eastern Orthodox Church titles
Preceded by Alexy II	Patriarch of Moscow and all Russia; 2009–present	Incumbent
Preceded by Theodosius (Protsyuk)	Metropolitan Bishop of Smolensk; 1984–2009	Succeeded by Theophylact (Kuryanov)
