= Saint Petersburg Theological Academy =

University

- Санкт-Петербургская духовная академия
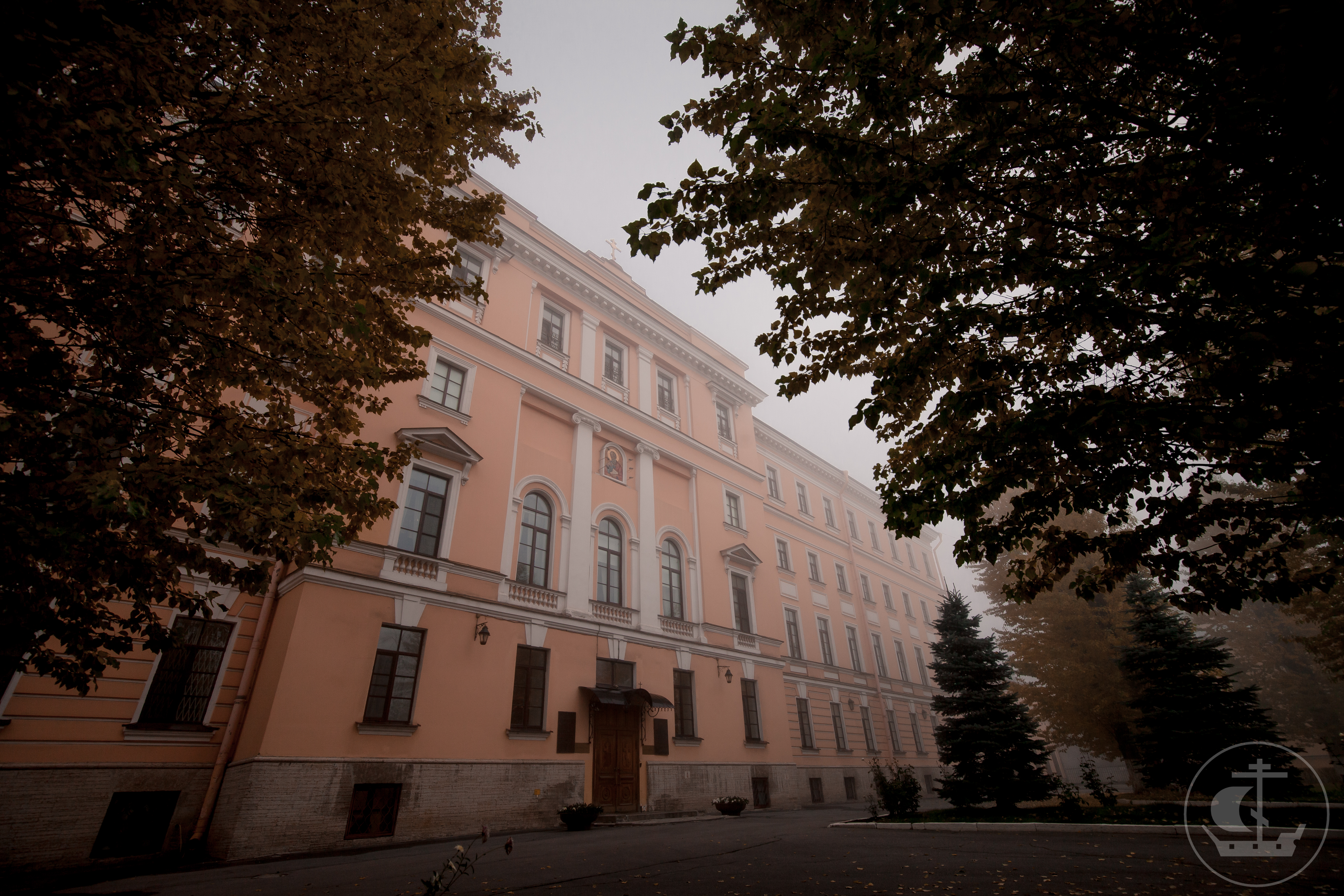
- Established: 1797
- Location: Saint Petersburg, Russia; 59°55′03″N 30°22′59″E
- Website: spbda.ru

The Saint Petersburg Theological Academy (Russian: Санкт-Петербургская духовная академия) is a higher education institution of the Russian Orthodox Church, located in Saint Petersburg, Russia. The academy prepares theologians, clergymen, singers and icon writers for the Eastern Orthodox Church and grants bachelor, master, candidate and doctorate degrees. It was founded in 1797 by Metropolitan Gabriel (Petrov) of Saint Petersburg, as part of the Alexander Nevsky Lavra.

At the turn of the 20th century the Saint Petersburg Theological Academy was one of four religious academies (with those of Moscow, Kiev and Kazan) of the Russian Orthodox Church. The class of 1898 had a total of 235 students regularly attending classes.

== History ==
On July 11, 1721, Archbishop Theodosius (Yanovsky) of Novgorod, in pursuance of imperial decrees, ordered to "establish for the common benefit at the Alexander Nevsky Monastery, for the teaching of young children reading and writing, a Slavonic school". In the autumn of the same year, classes began. Initially, the school studied the alphabet, writing, arithmetic, grammar, listened to the interpretation of the Decalogue, the Lord's Prayer and the Beatitudes.

In 1726, under Empress Catherine I, the Slavonic School was renamed the Slavic-Greek-Latin Seminary. If the Slavic school provided only elementary literacy, then the seminary aimed to give future ministers of the Church both general and theological education. Its rector was Archimandrite Peter (Smelich), adviser to the Holy Synod, a Serb by birth, a former archimandrite of the Simonov Monastery in Moscow. Thanks to the efforts of teachers Grigory Kremenetsky and Andrey Zertis-Kamensky, the St. Petersburg seminary was competently organized. Those who completed the seminary course were entitled to the best places in the dioceses. According to the program of the Spiritual Regulations, in 1721, in St. Petersburg, in addition to the Alexander Nevsky Slavic School, Archbishop Theophan (Prokopovich) of Pskov, opened a second school, which immediately received the name of the seminary. It was located at the courtyard of the bishop on the embankment of the Karpovka River.

After the death of Archbishop Theophan in 1736, the seminary came under the jurisdiction of the Government Cabinet, but gradually began to decline. Finally, by the decree of Empress Anna Ioannovna of March 22, 1738, the senior pupils of this school were assigned to business, and the rest (in the number of 21 people) were transferred for further study to the Alexander Nevsky Slavic-Greek-Latin Seminary. Having received replenishment from the former school of Archbishop Theophan, the number of students of the Alexander Nevsky Seminary in 1740 reached 85. In addition to the establishment of secondary theological schools in St. Petersburg, it was supposed to open a proper theological academy named "Petergarten". It was planned to invite the most famous professors from Western universities to the positions of teachers. The construction of the building began in 1722, but was stopped due to lack of funds. In the same year, an already built building was provided for the academy – the house of the deceased Tsarevna Catherine Alekseyevna. In August 1724 The Holy Synod appealed to the Emperor with a request to allocate money for the maintenance of students, teachers and servants. However, the case dragged on until the death of Peter the Great, and under his successors it was completely discontinued. By order of the authorities or at their own request, many graduates of the Slavic-Greek-Latin Seminary could enroll in other higher and secondary educational institutions, in particular, in the gymnasium and university at the Academy of Sciences established in 1724 by decree of Peter the Great. In their first set, it was supposed to gather 30 students from the pupils of the Moscow Theological Academy, Alexander Nevsky and Novgorod seminaries.

In 1761, the Holy Synod gave permission to seminary graduates to study abroad with the payment of double salaries. They went to the Universities of Cambridge and Oxford in England and Göttingen in the Electorate of Hanover.

In 1786, an education reform was launched in the Russian Empire. In accordance with this, Metropolitan Gabriel (Petrov) of Novgorod and St. Petersburg filed a petition for the transformation of the Alexander Nevsky Seminary into the Main Seminary. According to the decree of the Holy Synod of 1788, the best pupils of diocesan seminaries should be sent to study at the capital's Main Seminary. At the same time, higher classes of the Novgorod Seminary was transferred to the Alexander Nevsky Monastery and attached to the Main Seminary. The number of students in the Main Seminary has reached 200. After graduating from the Main Seminary, graduates were sent as teachers to their diocesan seminaries. New disciplines appeared: church history, mechanics, natural history, and a class of mathematics and experimental physics was also opened.

In 1797, the Holy Trinity Alexander Nevsky Monastery was renamed the Alexander Nevsky Lavra, and the Alexander Nevsky Main Seminary was transformed into the Alexander Nevsky Academy by decree of Paul I of 18 december 1797. In the Theological academies, in addition to general seminar courses, they decided to teach a complete system of philosophy and theology, higher eloquence, physics and languages: Latin, Hebrew, Greek, German and French. On behalf of Metropolitan Ambrose (Podobedov), Bishop Eugene (Bolkhovitinov) drew up a outline for the establishment of Theological schools in 1805. It formed the basis for the reform of the entire system of spiritual education in Russia. Theological academies became not only higher theological educational institutions, but also church-scientific centers, which were also entrusted with the tasks of educational and publishing activities. The mentors of the academy, in addition to their teaching activities, often carried out various kinds of special assignments of the Synod, reviewing books, compiling written refutations of sectarian and non-Orthodox teachings. Graduates of the Theological Academy were assigned as mentors to Theological seminaries and colleges, to parish ministry, priests at Russian missions abroad and embassies.

On June 26, 1808, Emperor Alexander I approved the draft reform of theological schools, and at the beginning of the following year, the Alexander Nevsky Academy was divided into three completely independent stages: the St. Petersburg Theological Academy - the first in Russia, organized according to the new charter (the highest stage), the St. Petersburg Theological Seminary (the middle stage) and the Alexander Nevsky Theological College (the lowest stage). The New Academy became a complex institution in structure, it was not only a higher theological school and an educational center, but also an administrative center for an entire educational district. Her tasks included spiritual education and preparation for higher ecclesiastical positions, dissemination of knowledge among the clergy, management of Theological seminaries and schools of the district, the caesura of spiritual writings. The Academy was under the jurisdiction of the Holy Synod and the diocesan bishop. After the development and adoption of the Charter, the grand opening of the St. Petersburg Theological Academy took place on February 17, 1809. It was still located in the Alexander Nevsky Lavra. In 1841, the seminary was also transferred beyond the walls of the Lavra to a specially constructed building.

In 1821, the academic journal "Christian Reading" was established, which published translations of the Holy Scriptures from Hebrew and ancient Greek into Russian, theological, ecclesiastical and historical works of professors and teachers of the Academy. Since the 1840s, the Academy began to accept representatives of other Local Orthodox Churches to study: from Bulgaria, Greece, Romania, Serbia and other countries.

During the First World War, from September 1915 to the beginning of 1918, the premises of the Alexander Nevsky Antoniev Theological College, the hospital and the southern part of the Theological Academy building and the 4th floor of the Seminary building were occupied by the Red Cross infirmary No. 279 for 150 wounded and sick soldiers, but educational institutions continued their work. In June 1918, members of the corporation and students of the Academy solemnly welcomed Patriarch Tikhon of Moscow and All Russia, who came to Petrograd.

On 11 December 1917, shortly after the October Revolution, all church-controlled educational institutions were nationalized by decree of the Council of People's Commissars of the RSFSR, with jurisdiction being transferred from the Holy Synod to the People's Commissariat for Education. Then on 2 February 1918, Vladimir Lenin signed the Decree on Separation of Church and State, which prohibited religious institutions from receiving state funds or forcing their members to pay tithes. This pushed the Petrograd Theological Academy into an acute financial crisis, and the Holy Synod could not or would not manage any monetary support. The academy attempted to save itself by merging into Petrograd University as one of its faculties, and the university itself was warm to the idea, but this never occurred due to opposition from the Bolshevik Education Commissar Anatoly Lunacharsky, eventually leading to the closure of the academy in autumn of that year.

In November 1945, Theological and pastoral courses were opened in Leningrad, in part of the building of the theological seminary. The Leningrad Theological Academy was established on September 1, 1946 by decree of His Holiness Patriarch Alexy I of Moscow and All Russia, and the Leningrad Theological Seminary was established by decree of His Holiness the Patriarch on the basis of Theological and pastoral courses that worked in Leningrad in the 1945/1946 academic year. On October 14, 1946, on the Day of the Intercession of the Theotokos, the grand opening of the Leningrad Theological Academy and Seminary took place in the presence of Patriarch Alexy I.

After the beginning of new anti-religious persecutions in 1958, the Council for the Affairs of the Russian Orthodox Church stopped any attempts to increase the number of students in seminaries and academies and expand their premises. On July 17, 1959, it was decided to gradually close the only correspondence sector of Leningrad theological Schools in the country, although its actual functioning in an abbreviated form continued until 1967. In 1961, at the height of the Khrushchev anti-religious campaign, the question of closing Leningrad theological schools arose. Due to the opposition of the Soviet authorities, only 8 people were able to enter the seminary in 1961, although 33 applications for admission were submitted. Metropolitan Nikodim (Rotov), appointed to the Leningrad Department in October 1963, took active measures to prevent the closure of the theological schools of Leningrad. As chairman of the DECR, Metropolitan Nikodim began to energetically include the Academy in international activities: foreign delegations began to come here, and academy professors began to go to various international conferences. At the initiative of Metropolitan Nikodim, 7 Africans from Uganda and Kenya were invited to study as part of the Christian exchange. In 1965, by the decision of the Holy Synod, the Faculty of African Christian Youth was established at the Leningrad Academy and Seminary, which was then transformed into the Faculty of Foreign Students.

In the 1960s, a regency circle began to operate for seminary and academy students. Since 1967, the Academy Council, headed by the rector, Bishop Miсhael (Mudyugin), decided to henceforth call the regency circle the Regency Class and to produce the first set of students from among the students of theological schools. At the head of the Regent class was an honored professor Nikolay Uspensky. On the initiative of the rector, Bishop Kirill (Gundyaev) of Vyborg, in 1979 the first enrollment for the Regency Department (formally formed in 1983) took place, where girls were admitted for the first time in the history of the revived theological schools. In 1988 an optional icon painting class was opened. At first it acted as an educational center for laypeople, then as a circle with a workshop and a repository of icons that were restored and used for the needs of the academy, and later as a class with teachers who worked on a voluntary basis.

== Rectors ==
- Archimandrite Eugraph (Muzalevsky-Platonov) (February 4 — November 11, 1809)
- Archimandrite Sergius (Krylov-Platonov) (January 7, 1810 — March 3, 1812)
- Bishop Philaret (Drozdov) (March 11, 1812 — March 13, 1819)
- Bishop Gregory (Postnikov) (May 2, 1819 — January 4, 1826)
- Archimandrite John (Dobrozrakov) (January 30, 1826 — August 5, 1830)
- Archimandrite Smaragd (Kryzhanovsky) (August 27 1830 — September 20 1831)
- Archimandrite Benedict (Grigorovich) (November 4, 1831 — June 8, 1833)
- Archimandrite Vitaly (Shchepetev) (June 8, 1833 — June 1837)
- Archimandrite Nicholas (Dobrokhotov) (July 5, 1837 — April 1841)
- Bishop Athanasius (Drozdov) (April 21, 1841 — January 13, 1847)
- Bishop Eusebius (Orlinsky) (January 17, 1847 — December 19, 1850)
- Bishop Makarius (Bulgakov) (December 20, 1850 — May 1, 1857)
- Archimandrite Theophan (Govorov) (June 13, 1857 — May 9, 1859)
- Bishop Nectarius (Nadezhdin) (July 17, 1859 — September 29, 1860)
- Archimandrite Joannicius (Rudnev) (October 5, 1860 — January 13, 1864)
- Bishop John (Sokolov) (January 17 (29), 1864 — November 9 (21), 1866)
- Protopresbyter John Yanyshev (November 29, 1866 — October 19, 1883)
- Bishop Arsenius (Bryantsev) (October 22, 1883 — March 28, 1887)
- Bishop Anthony (Vadkovsky) (April 15, 1887 - October 24, 1892)
- Bishop Boris (Plotnikov) (October 30, 1892 — December 2, 1893)
- Bishop Nikander (Molchanov) (December 13, 1893 — August 23, 1895)
- Bishop John (Kratirov) (August 31, 1895 - January 16, 1899)
- Bishop Boris (Plotnikov) (February 17, 1899 — January 20, 1901)
- Bishop Sergius (Stragorodsky) (January 24, 1901 — October 15, 1905)
- Bishop Sergius (Tikhomirov) (October 15, 1905 — March 21, 1908)
- Bishop Theophan (Bystrov) (February 4, 1909 — October 19, 1910)
- Bishop George (Yaroshevsky) (November 22, 1910 — May 13, 1913)
- Bishop Anastasius (Alexandrov) (May 30, 1913 — June 23, 1918)
- Archpriest John Bogoyavlensky (September 1, 1946 — June 22, 1947)
- Archpriest Alexander Osipov (1947-1948) acting
- Bishop Simeon (Bychkov) (April 20, 1948 — June 30, 1952)
- Archpriest Mikhail Speransky (July 21, 1952 — August 16, 1966)
- Bishop Michael (Mudyugin) (August 16, 1966 — July 30, 1968)
- Bishop Herman (Timofeev) (November 28, 1968 — June 25, 1970)
- Bishop Meliton (Solovyov) (June 25, 1970 — December 26, 1974)
- Archbishop Kirill (Gundyaev) (December 26, 1974 — December 26, 1984)
- Archimandrite Manuel (Pavlov) (December 29, 1984 — March 2, 1986) acting
- Archpriest Nikolai Gundyaev (March 2, 1986 — June 22, 1987)
- Archpriest Vladimir Sorokin (August 21, 1987 — August 12, 1992)
- Archpriest Vasily Stoikov (August 12, 1992 — July 17, 1996)
- Archbishop Constantine (Goryanov) (July 17, 1996 — October 6, 2008)
- Archbishop Ambrose (Ermakov) (October 6, 2008 — July 14, 2018)
- Bishop Seraphim (Amelchenkov) (July 14, 2018 — July 9, 2019)
- Bishop Siluan (Nikitin) (since July 9, 2019)

== Notable alumni ==
- Saint Patriarch Tikhon of Moscow and All Russia
- Saint Mardarije Uskoković of America and Canada
- Patriarch Sergius of Moscow and All Russia
- Patriarch Alexy II of Moscow and All Russia
- Patriarch Kirill of Moscow and All Russia
- Starets Elias Nozdrin
- Metropolitan Nikodim (Rotov) of Leningrad and Novgorod
- Metropolitan Vladimir (Sabodan) of Kiev and All Ukraine,
- H.H. Baselios Marthoma Mathews III, Catholicos of the East & Malankara Metropolitan (the Supreme Head of the Malankara Orthodox Syrian Church of India)
- Bishop Nikolaj Velimirović of Ohrid and Žiča, Yugoslavia.
