= World Russian People's Council =

International forum

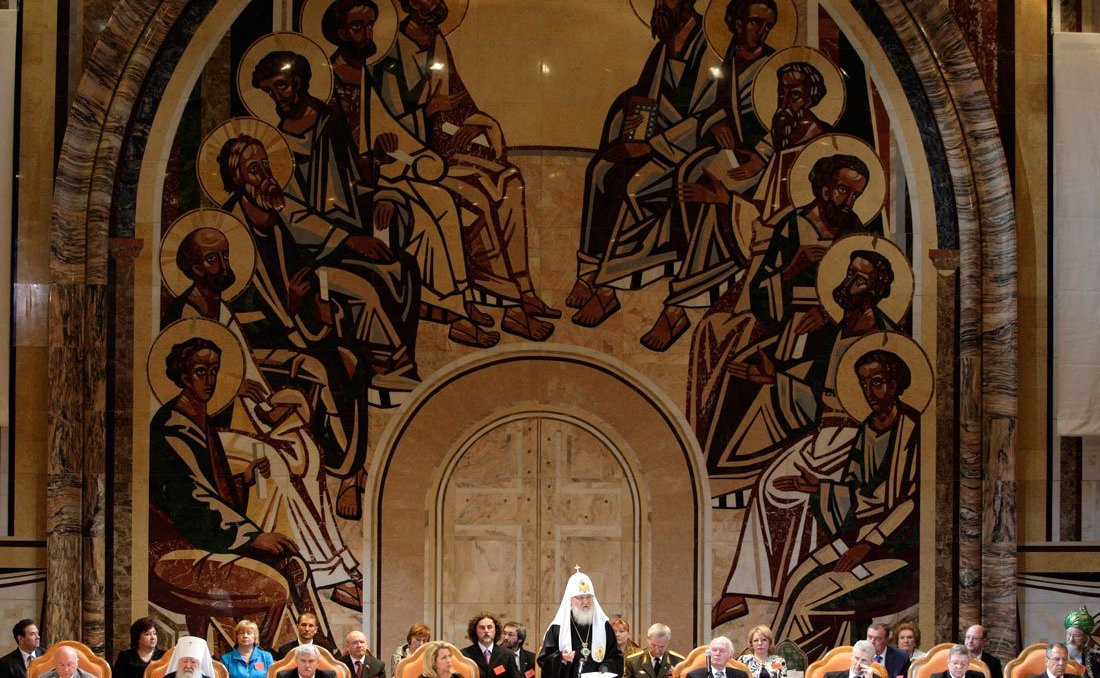

The World Russian People's Council (Russian: Всемирный Русский Народный Собор, romanized: Vsemirny Russky Narodny Sobor) is an international public organization and forum.

It is displayed as "a place of meeting for people" who are "united under a shared objective – concern over the present and future of Russia". In Council sessions, participants include governmental representatives, leaders of public associations, clergy members of the major religions in Russia, science and culture figures, and delegates of "Russian communities from the near and far abroad."

The World Russian People's Council was founded in 1993. In its first official document, it postulated the rebuilding of Russia as a single state within the boundaries of the Soviet Union and the tsarist Russian Empire. The council is headed by the Patriarch of Moscow and all Rus' Kirill.

Regional departments operate in many Russian cities, including Volgograd, Kaliningrad, Smolensk, and Sarov.

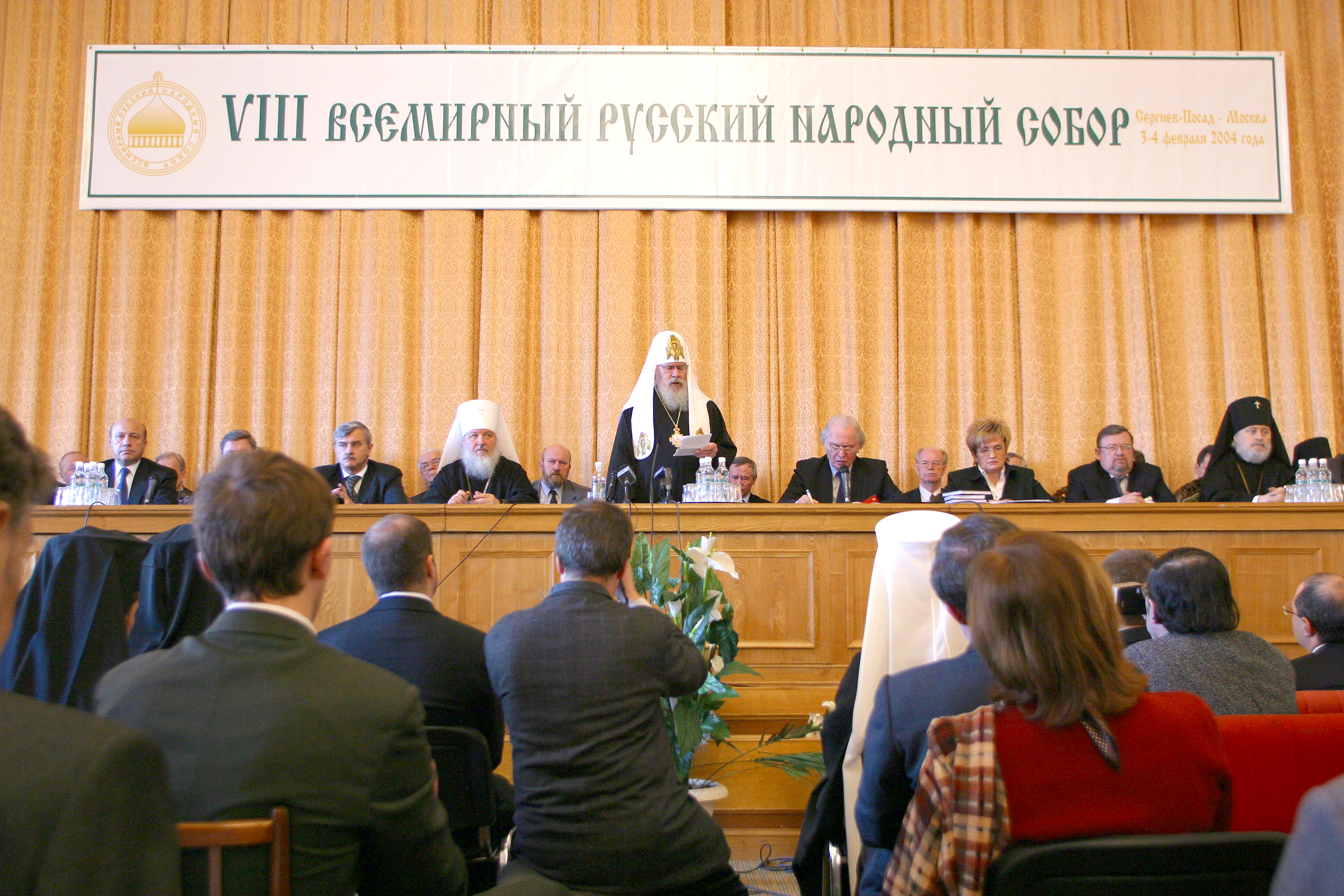
Speech by Patriarch Alexy II at the VIII World Russian People's Council, 2004

On 21 July 2005, the World Russian People's Council was given special consultative status within the United Nations.

During its 10th meeting, held on 4–6 April 2006 in Moscow's Cathedral of Christ the Saviour, it adopted The Russian Declaration of Human Rights.

During its meeting of late March 2024 it adopted a document that stated that the Russian invasion of Ukraine was a "Holy War." The document stated that the war had the goal of "protecting the world from the onslaught of globalism and the victory of the West, which has fallen into Satanism." It also stated that following the war "the entire territory of modern Ukraine should enter the zone of Russia's exclusive influence". This was to be done so "The possibility of the existence of a Russophobic political regime hostile to Russia and its people on this territory, as well as a political regime controlled from an external center hostile to Russia, should be completely excluded." The document also made reference to the "triunity of the Russian people" and it claimed that Belarusians and Ukrainians "should be recognised only as sub-ethnic groups of the Russians".
