= Theodosius Protsyuk =

Metropolitan of Omsk and Tara

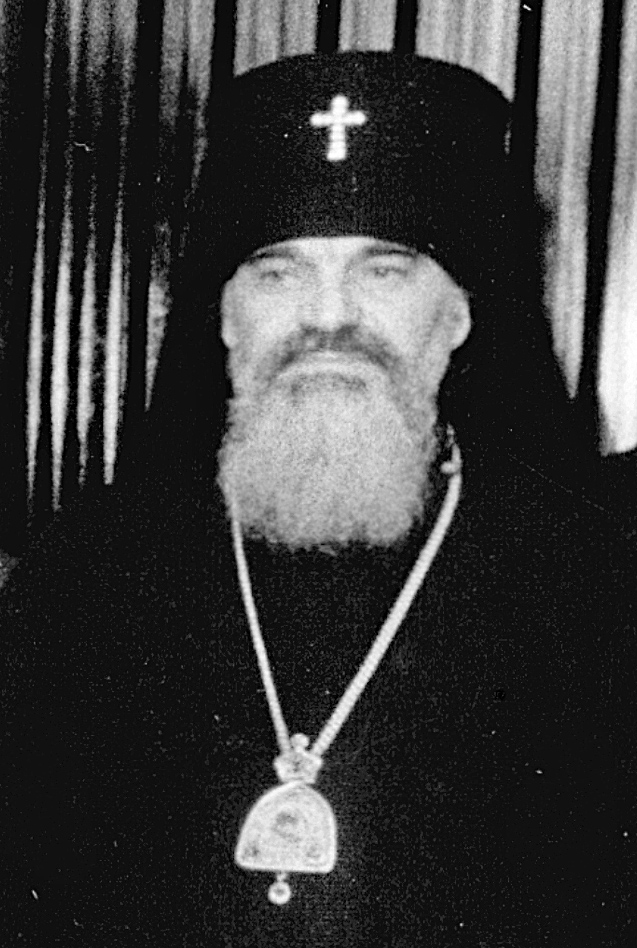
Theodosius (Metropolitan of Omsk and Tara)

Theodosius (secular name Igor Ivanovich Protsyuk, Russian: Игорь Иванович Процюк; 7 January 1927 – 28 May 2016) was the Metropolitan of Omsk and Tara.
