= Nikodim Rotov =

20th-century Russian Orthodox archbishop

His Eminence Nikodim
- Metropolitan of Leningrad and Novgorod
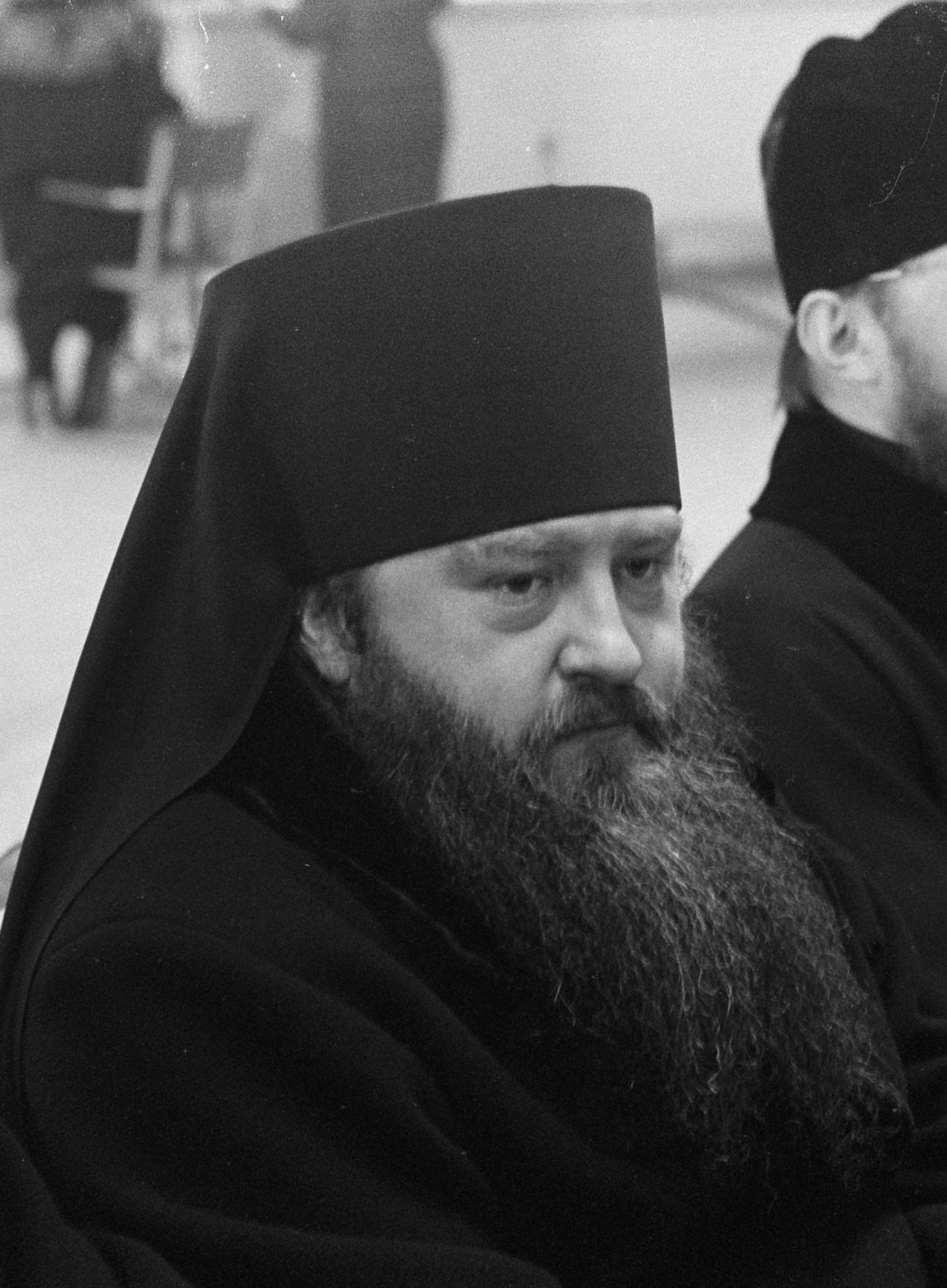
- Nikodim in 1963
- Church: Russian Orthodox Church
- Installed: 9 October 1963
- Term ended: 5 September 1978
- Predecessor: Pimen I
- Successor: Anthony (Melnikov)

Orders
- Ordination: 19 August 1947
- Consecration: 10 July 1960 by Pimen I

Personal details
- Born: Boris Georgievich Rotov; 15 October 1929 Frolovo, Korablinsky District, Moscow Oblast, RSFSR, USSR
- Died: 5 September 1978 (aged 48) Vatican City
- Denomination: Eastern Orthodox Church

Metropolitan Nikodim (secular name Boris Georgiyevich Rotov; (Note: In this name that follows East Slavic naming customs, the patronymic is Georgiyevich and the family name is Rotov.) Russian: Борис Георгиевич Ротов, 15 October 1929 – 5 September 1978) was the Russian Orthodox metropolitan of Leningrad and Novgorod from 1963 until his death.

== Biography ==
Nikodim was born in Frolovo in south-west Russia. Ordained in 1960 at the age of 31, the youngest bishop in the Christian world at the time, he went on to become one of the six presidents of the World Council of Churches. According to the Mitrokhin Archive, which claimed deep Communist penetration of the Russian Orthodox Church, Nikodim was a KGB agent. Rotov's rapid rise through the Church hierarchy was considered "unmistakable evidence of KGB approval". whose ecumenical activity with the Roman Catholic Church and the WCC served to further Soviet goals. The KGB assigned Nikodim the codename "Svyatoslav".

Nikodim is said to have participated in negotiating a secret 1960s agreement between Soviet and Vatican officials that authorized Eastern Orthodox participation in the Second Vatican Council in exchange for non-condemnation of atheistic communism during the conciliar assemblies.

Nikodim collapsed and died in 1978 while in Rome for the installation of Pope John Paul I. The new pope, who also himself died a few weeks later, prayed over him in his final moments.

== Bibliography ==
- Andrew, Christopher M.; Miteokhin, Vasili (1999). The Sword And The Shield; The Mitrokhin Archive And The Secret History Of The KGB - Christopher M Andrew; Vasili Mitrokhin. Basic Books / Perseus Books Group. ISBN 0465003125.
- Ювеналий (Поярков), митр. (1998). Человек Церкви : К 20-летию со дня кончины и 70-летию со дня рождения Высокопреосвященнейшего митрополита Ленинградского и Новгородского Никодима, Патриаршего Экзарха Западной Европы (1929–1978). М.: Московская Епархия.
- Васильева О. Ю. Тридцать лет спустя... К истории Поместного Собора 1971 г. // Церковь в истории России. — Сб. 5. М.: ИРИ РАН, 2003. — С. 314–323.
- Василий (Кривошеин), архиеп. (2003). Две встречи : Митр. Николай (Ярушевич). Митр. Никодим (Ротов). Русская церковь в ХХ столетии : Документы, воспоминания, свидетельства. СПб.: Сатисъ : Держава. ISBN 5737300900.
- Боровой В. М., прот. Митрополит Никодим и церковная ситуация середины XX века // Личность в Церкви и обществе: Материалы Международной научно-богословской конференции (Москва, 17-19 сентября 2001 г.). — М. : Московская высшая православно-христианская школа, 2003. — 448 с. — С. 215–226.
- В память вечную...: Материалы Минского научно-богословского семинара, посвященного памяти высокопреосвященнейшего Никодима (Ротова), митрополита Ленинградского и Новгородского (†1978) / сост., отв. за вып. Н. В. Артимович. — Минск : [б. и.], 2006. — 120 с.
- Выдрин И. В. (2009). Митрополит Никодим. Екатеринбург: Полиграфист.
- Ежов А. Н. (2009). Архипастырские труды митрополита Никодима (Ротова) в контексте государственно-церковных отношений в СССР в 1960—1978 гг (500 экз ed.). М.; Архангельск: Институт управления. ISBN 978-5-8382-0465-3.
- Августин (Никитин), архим. (2008). Церковь плененная. Митрополит Никодим (1929—1978) и его эпоха (в воспоминаниях современников) (PDF). СПб.: Издательство Санкт-Петербургского университета. ISBN 978-5-288-04772-5.
- Владимир Сорокин, ed. (2008). Митрополит Никодим и Всеправославное единство. К 30-летию со дня кончины митрополита Ленинградского и Новгородского Никодима (Ротова) (PDF). СПб.: Изд-во Князь-Владимирского собора. ISBN 978-5-94813-013-2.
- Шкаровский М. В. [in Russian] (1999). Русская Православная Церковь при Сталине и Хрущёве: Государственно-церковные отношения в СССР в 1939-1964 гг. Материалы по истории церкви. Кн. 24 (3000 экз ed.). М.: Крутицкое Патриаршее подворье.
- Шкаровский М. В. Ленинградская Академия и семинария в период испытаний. 1958—1978 годы // Санкт-Петербургские духовные школы в ХХ-XXI вв. — Т. 2. — М. : Издательство Санкт-Петербургской Православной Духовной Академии, 2016. — 512 с. — С. 8-188
