= October 11 (Eastern Orthodox liturgics) =

Day in the Eastern Orthodox liturgical calendar

Eastern Orthodox liturgical calendar
October 10	October 11	October 12
October 11 O.S. ≍ October 24 N.S. October 11 N.S ≍ September 28 O.S.

An Eastern Orthodox cross

October 11 in Eastern Orthodox liturgical calendars is a feast day and a day of commemoration of saints and martyrs. Although some Orthodox churches use the Revised Julian Calendar and others use the traditional Julian calendar, the fixed commemorations for their respective October 11 are broadly the same, no matter which calendar is used. (Note: Despite the dates being the same, the days to which they refer typically differ by 13 days. The notation Old Style or O.S. is sometimes used to indicate a date in the traditional Julian Calendar (the "Old Calendar"). The notation New Style or N.S. indicates a date in the Revised Julian calendar (the "New Calendar").)

== Saints ==
- Holy Apostle Philip of the Seventy Disciples, one of the seven deacons (1st century)
- Martyrs Zenaida (Zenais) and Philonilla, of Tarsus in Cilicia (1st century)
- Saints Nectarius (397), Arsacius (405) and Sinisius (427), Archbishops of Constantinople and Ecumenical Patriarchs.
- Venerable Theophanes Graptus ("the Branded"), Confessor and Hymnographer, Bishop of Nicaea (850)

== Pre-Schism Western saints ==
- Saint Germanus of Besançon, Bishop of Besançon (c. 390) (Note: He followed St Desideratus as Bishop of Besançon in France and by tradition was martyred by Arians.: See: (in French) Germain de Besançon. Wikipédia. (French Wikipedia).) (Note: "At Besancon, in France, St. Germanus, bishop and martyr.")
- Saint Placidia, a holy virgin venerated in Verona in Italy (c. 460)
- Saint Gratus of Oloron, first Bishop of Oloron in the south of France (c. 506)
- Saint Firminus of Uzès, born in Narbonne in the south of France, he became Bishop of Uzès (553) (Note: "At Uzes, in Narbonese Gaul, St. Firminus, bishop and confessor.")
- Saint Cainnech of Aghaboe (Canice, Kenneth, Kenny), Abbot, of Aghaboe in Ireland, and missionary in Scotland (600) (Note: c.525-c.599. Born in the north of Ireland, he was a disciple of St Finian of Clonard and St Cadoc in Wales. He founded the monastery of Agahaboe and perhaps of Kilkenny, which is named after him. He later preached in Scotland where he was the first to build a church in the place now known as St Andrews.) (Note: "ST. CANICE, or KENNETH, came to Britain from Ireland, his native country, and placed himself under the holy discipline of St. Cadoc in Wales, from whom he learned the ways of Christian perfection, and in a special degree the practice of religious obedience. He afterwards returned to his native land, and departed to our Lord at the age of eighty-four. He is honoured as the Patron of Ossory and Kilkenny, his festival being on this day.")
- Venerable Æthelburh of Barking (Ethelburga), foundress of Barking Abbey, England (c. 676) (Note: Sister of St Erconwald of London, who helped found the convent of Barking in Essex where she became abbess.)
- Saint Agilbert (Aglibert), Bishop of Paris (c. 685) (Note: A monk at Jouarre in France with Abbot Ado. He went to England and preached in Wessex. When he returned to France, he became Bishop of Paris. He was buried at Jouarre Abbey, where his tomb is still preserved.)
- Saint Emilian, according to tradition a hermit in Rennes in Brittany. (Note: "At Rennes, St. Æmilian, confessor.")
- Saint Eufridus, a monk near Asti in Italy, whose relics were venerated in the Cathedral of Alba in Piedmont (7th century)
- Saint Ansilio, a monk whose relics were enshrined at the monastery of Lagny in the north of France (late 7th century)
- Saint Juliana of Pavilly, A servant girl who became a nun and then abbess at Pavilly (Note: See: (in French) Abbaye de Pavilly. Wikipédia. (French Wikipedia).) in France (c. 750)
- Saint Gummarus (Gomer), Belgian hermit, patron of Lier, Belgium (c. 774) (Note: After long and patient endurance of worldly perversity, he reposed as a hermit. The present town of Lierre (Lier) in Belgium grew up around his hermitage.) (Note: "At Lier, in Belgium, the departure from this life of St. Gummarus, confessor.")
- Saint Bruno the Great, Bishop of Cologne in Germany (965)

== Post-Schism Orthodox saints ==
- Saints Theophanes, Soleas and Jonah of Pergamos, Cyprus (12th century) (Note: We have no details about St. Theophanes. However Venerable Jonah is described as one of the "300 Allemagne Saints" in Cyprus. The 300 Allemagne Saints came to Cyprus from Palestine, and lived as ascetics in various parts of the island. According to some of their lives in the Great Synaxaristes, after the dissolution of the Second Crusade (1147 - 1149), they decided to live the monastic life in the Jordan desert. However since the Latins there disturbed them, they relocated to Cyprus and dispersed over the island.)
- Saint Theophanes, faster, of the Kiev Caves (12th century)
- Venerable Germanos "Maroulis" the Hagiorite (1336) (Note: His memory is also observed on July 10, on the "Synaxis of the Saints of Vatopaidi.")
- Venerable Philotheus Kokkinos of Mount Athos, Patriarch of Constantinople (1379)

=== New Martys and Confessors ===
- New Hieromartyr Philaret Velikanov and Alexander Grivsky, Priests (1918)
- New Hieromartyr Juvenalius (Maslovsky), Bishop of Riazan (1937) (Note: See: (in Russian) Иувеналий (Масловский). Википе́дия. (Russian Wikipedia): "В конце 2012 года стало известно, что имя священномученика Иувеналия (Масловского), в числе 36 новомучеников, было исключено из общецерковного календаря на 2013 год без каких-либо объяснений со стороны официальных структур Русской православной церкви; при этом решения о его деканонизации не выносилось[8] ни Священным Синодом, ни прошедшем в феврале 2013 года Архиерейским Собором (они только могут выносить решения о (де)канонизации от лица всей Церкви).")

== Other commemorations ==
- Commemoration of the Miracle from the Icon of Our Lord Jesus Christ in Beirut of Phoenicia (7th century) (Note: At the fourth session of the Seventh Ecumenical Council (in 787), Saint Peter, Bishop of Nicomedia, in defending the necessity of icon veneration, presented an account of Saint Athanasius about a miracle which occurred in the city of Beret, Phoenecia.)
- Commemoration of the Holy Fathers of the Seventh Ecumenical Council. ( On the Sunday between October 11 and 17 )
- Synaxis of the Saints of Kios. (On the Sunday between October 11–17)
- Synaxis of the Elders of Optina: (Note: See: (in Russian) Собор Оптинских старцев. Википе́дия. (Russian Wikipedia).)

- Leonid of Optina (1841)
- Macarius (1860) (Note: See: (in Russian) Макарий Оптинский. Википе́дия. (Russian Wikipedia).)
- Moses (1862) (Note: See: (in Russian) Моисей Оптинский. Википе́дия. (Russian Wikipedia).)
- Anthony (1865) (Note: See: (in Russian) Антоний Оптинский. Википе́дия. (Russian Wikipedia).)
- Hilarion (1873)
- Ambrose (1891)
- Anatole I the "Elder" (1894) (Note: See: (in Russian) Анатолий (Зерцалов). Википе́дия. (Russian Wikipedia).)
- Isaac I (1894)
- Joseph (1911) (Note: See: (in Russian) Иосиф Оптинский. Википе́дия. (Russian Wikipedia).)
- Barsanuphius (1913) (Note: See: (in Russian) Варсонофий Оптинский. Википе́дия. (Russian Wikipedia).)
- Anatole II the "Younger" (1922) (Note: See: (in Russian) Анатолий (Потапов). Википе́дия. (Russian Wikipedia).)
- Nektary (1928)
- New Hieroconfessor Nikon (1931)
- New Hieromartyr Archimandrite Isaac II (1938)

== Icon gallery ==
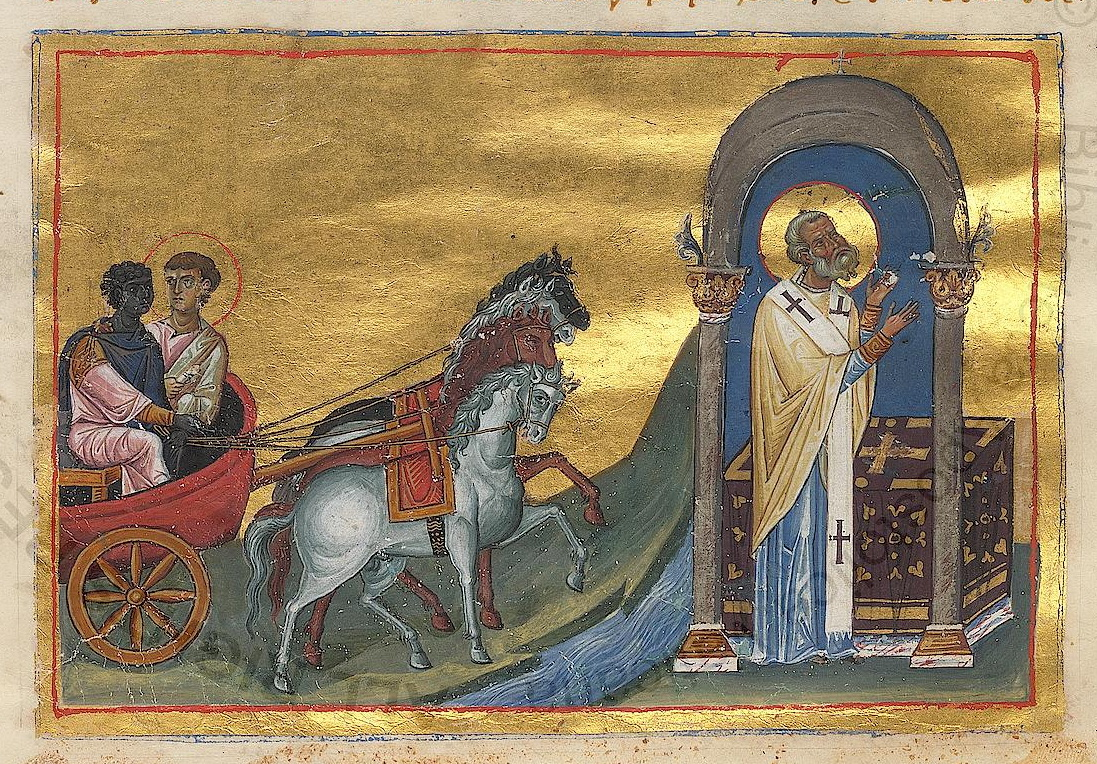
Holy Apostle Philip.
(Menologion of Basil II, 10th century).

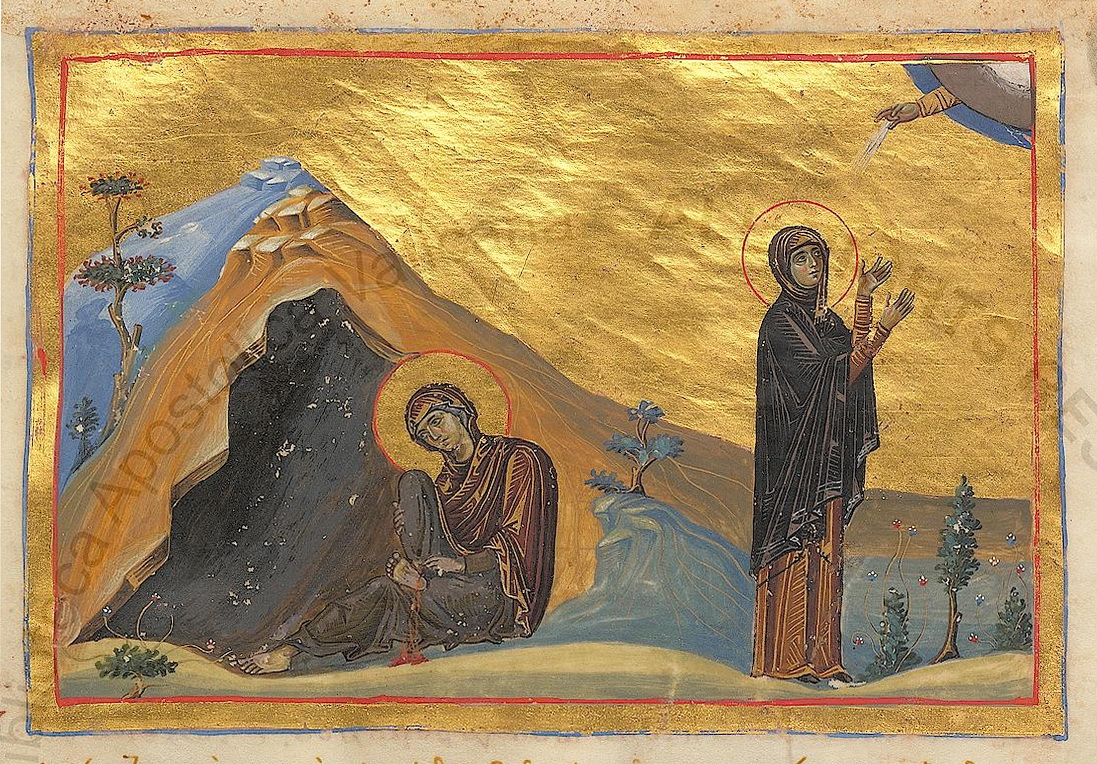
Martyrs Zenaida (Zenais) and Philonilla.
(Menologion of Basil II, 10th century).

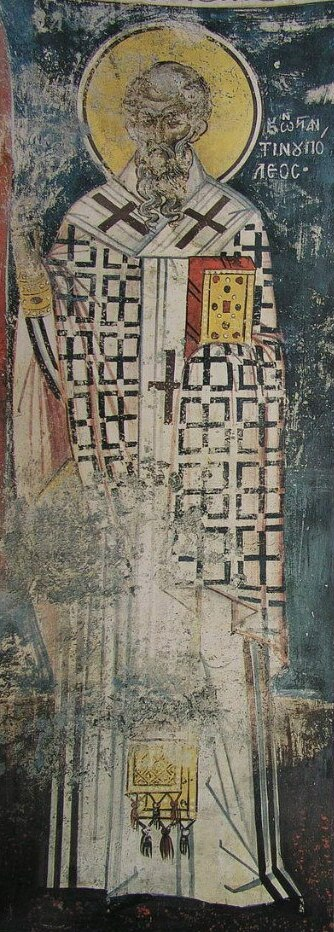
St. Nectarius, Abp. of Constantinople.

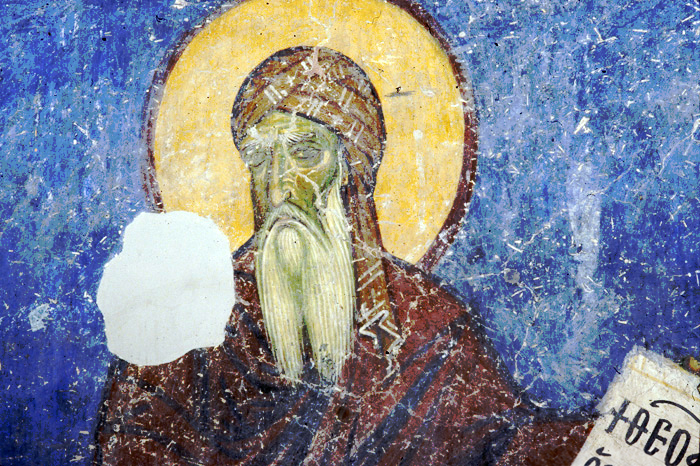
Saint Theophanes Graptus.

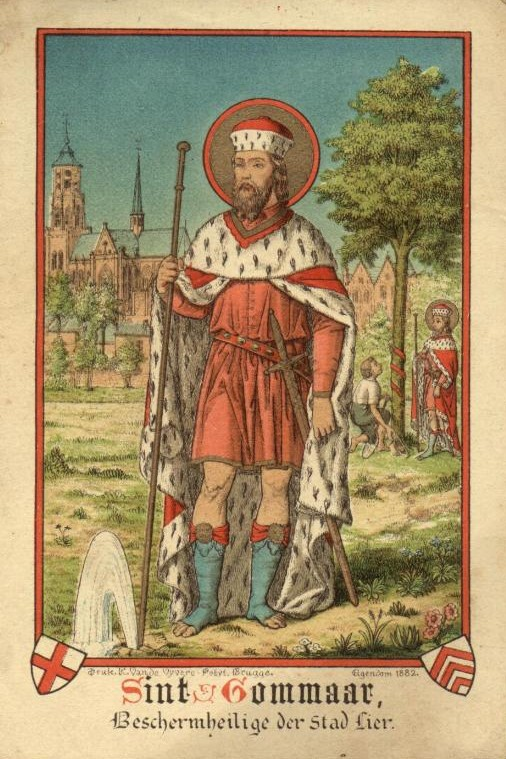
Saint Gummarus (Gomer), patron of Lier, Belgium.

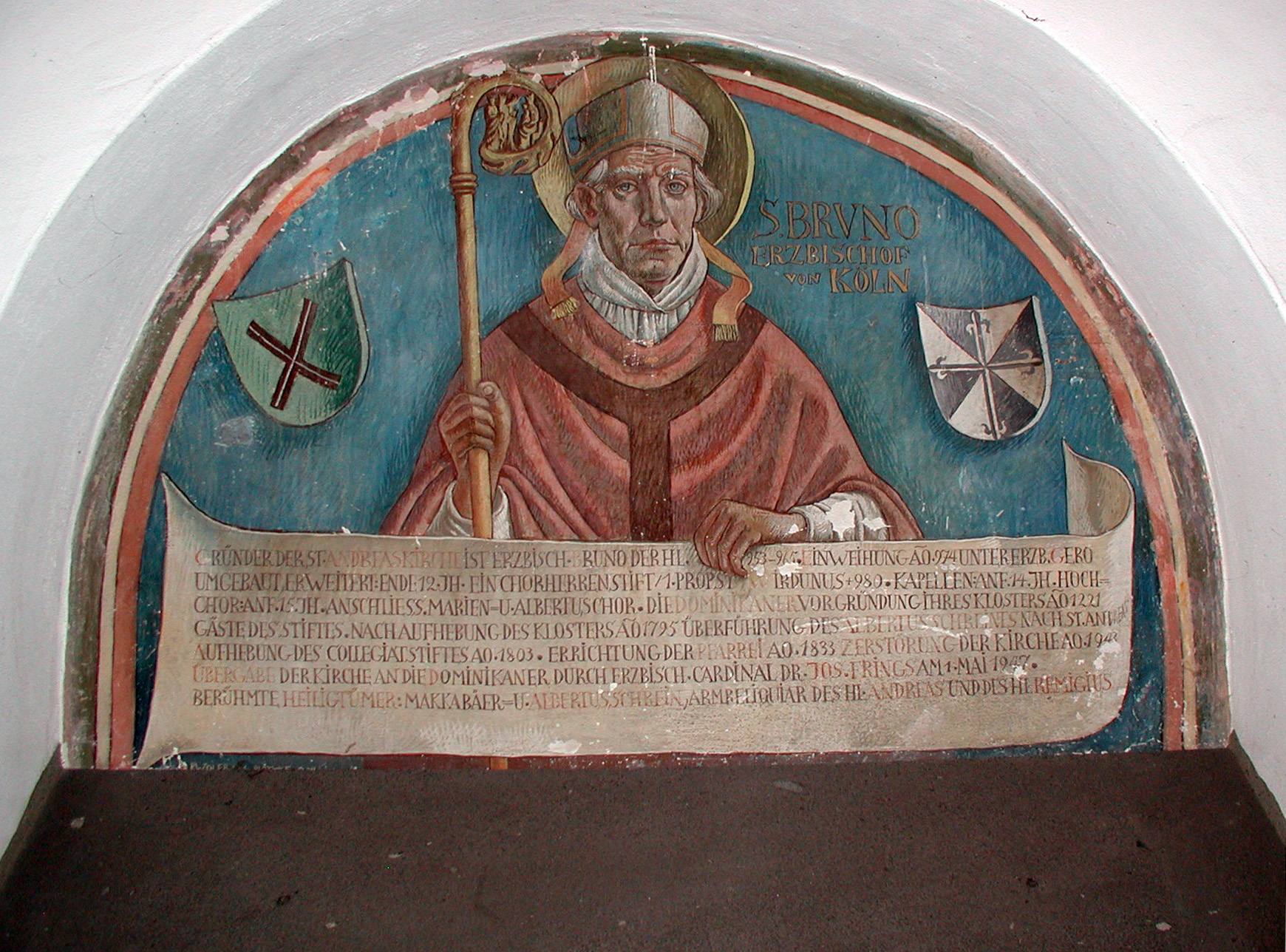
Saint Bruno the Great, Bishop of Cologne.

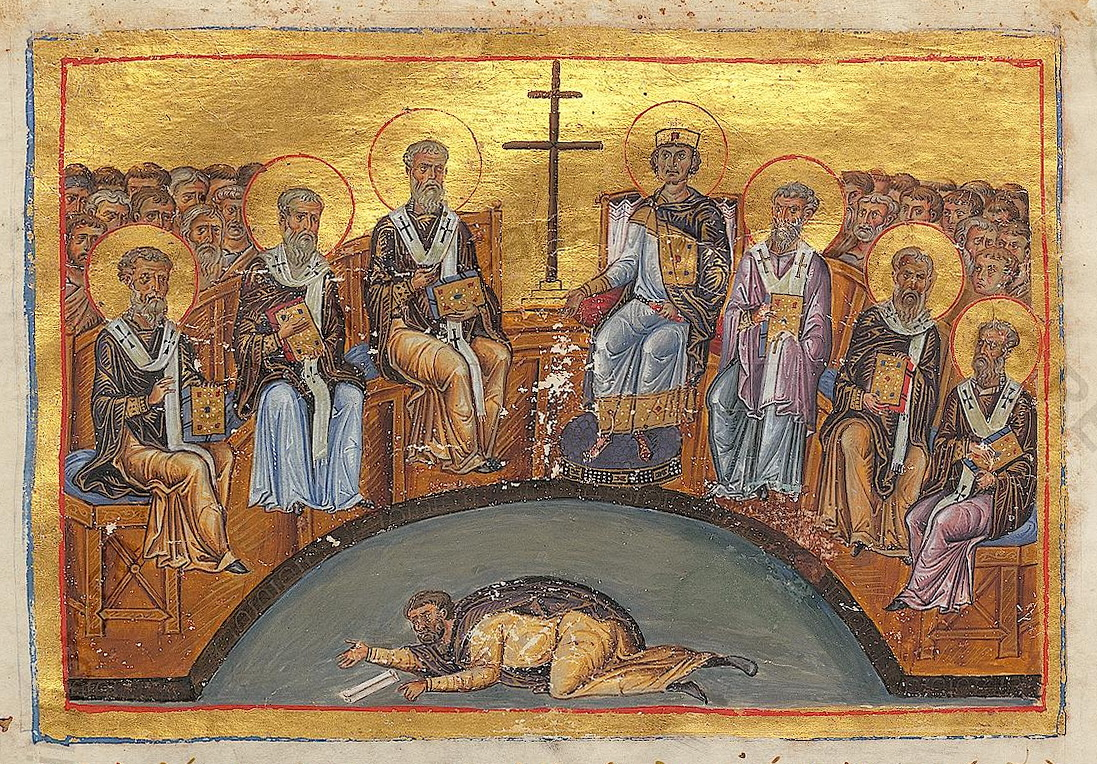
Holy Fathers of the Seventh Ecumenical Council
(Second Council of Nicaea).
(Menologion of Basil II, 10th century).

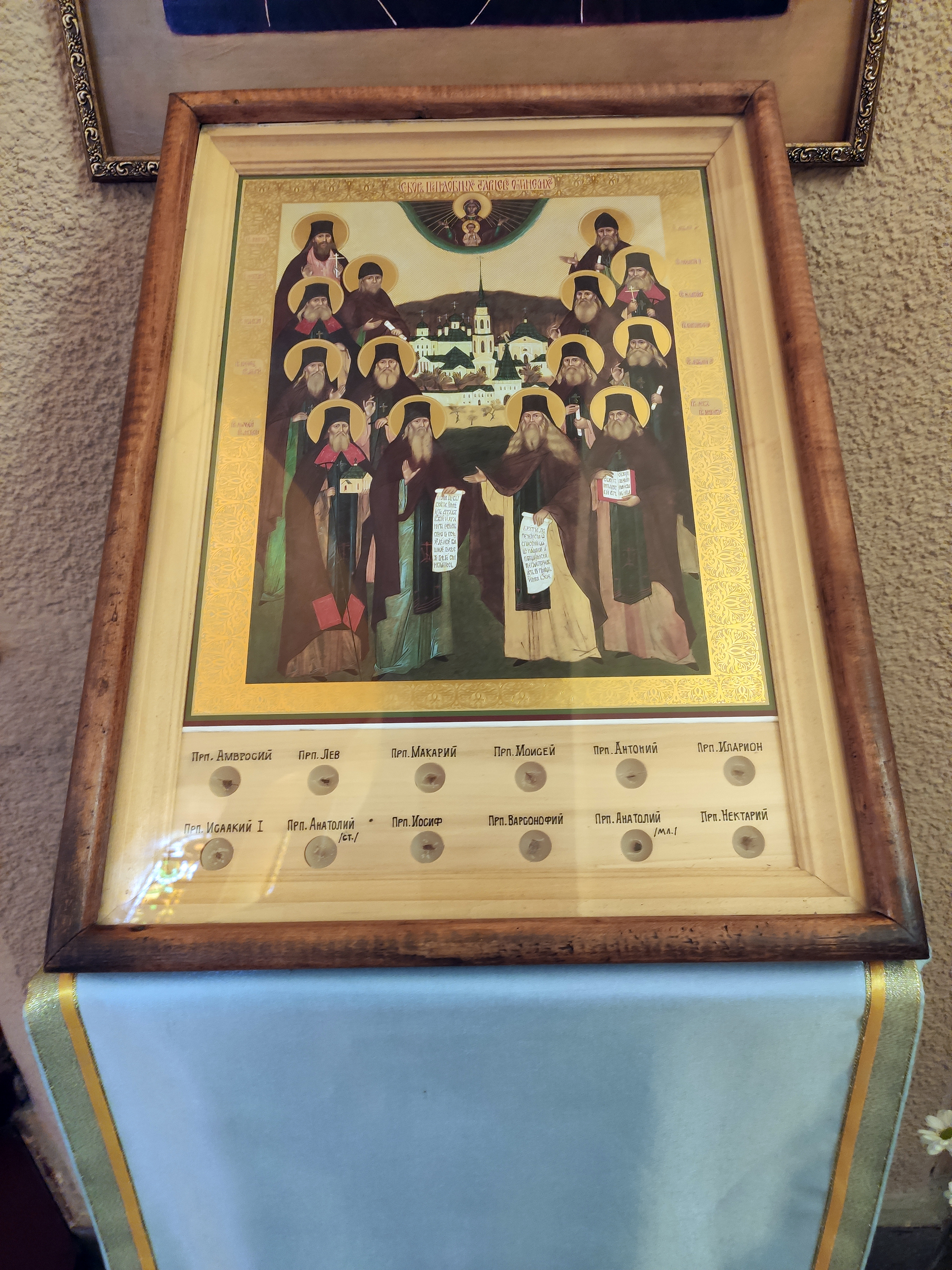
Synaxis of the Elders of Optina.

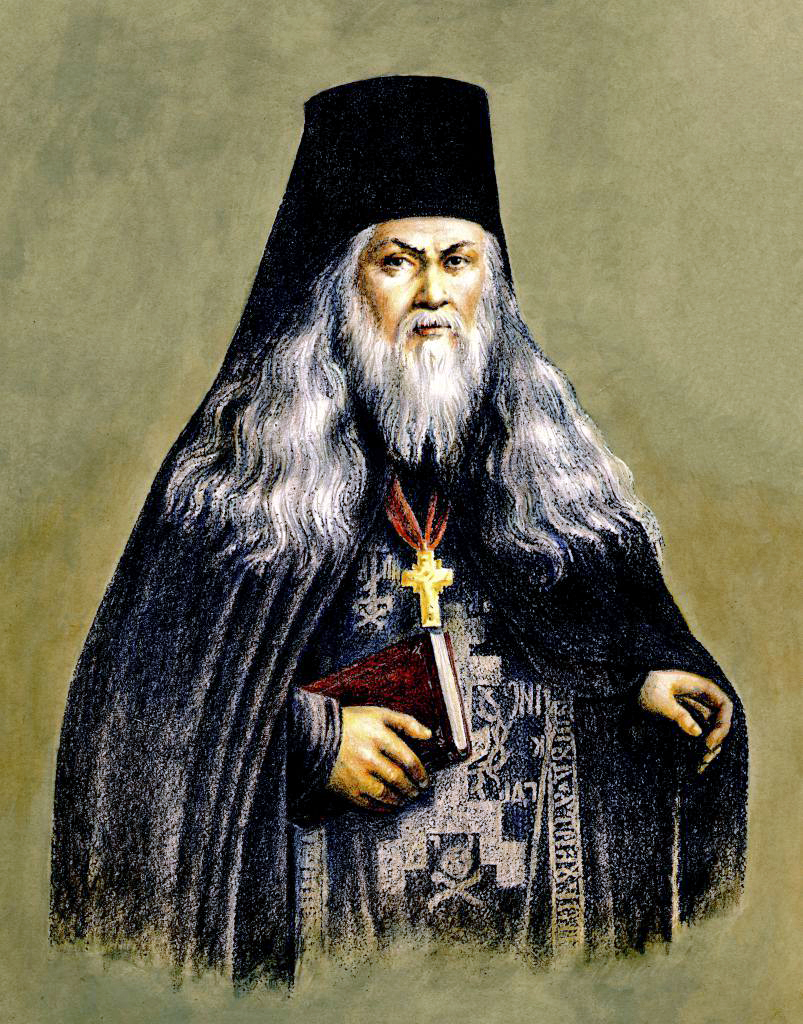
St. Leonid of Optina (†1841)

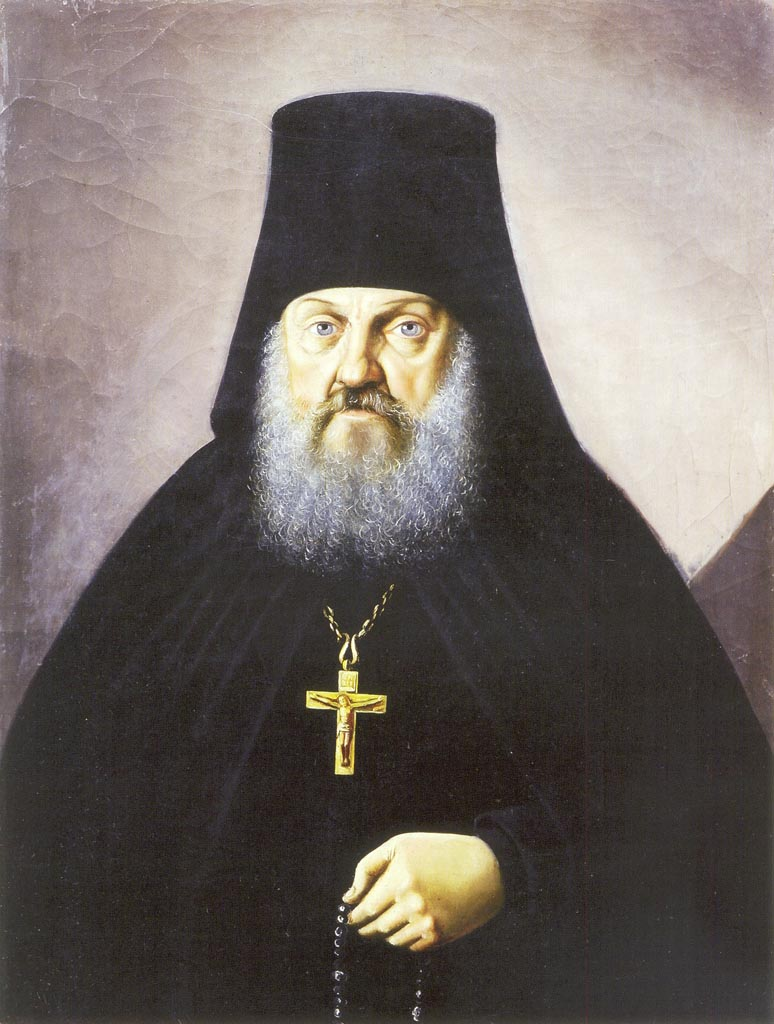
St. Anthony of Optina (†1865)

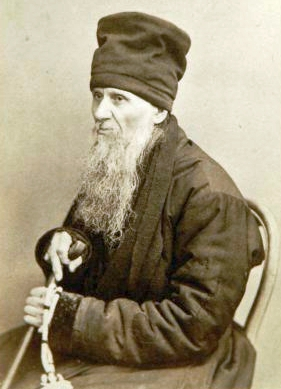
St. Ambrose of Optina (†1891)

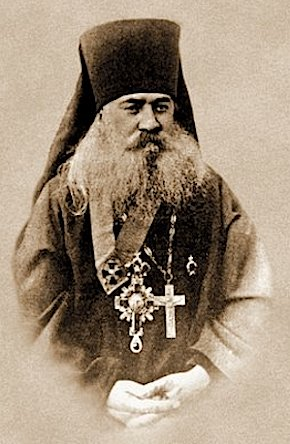
St. Isaac of Optina (†1894)

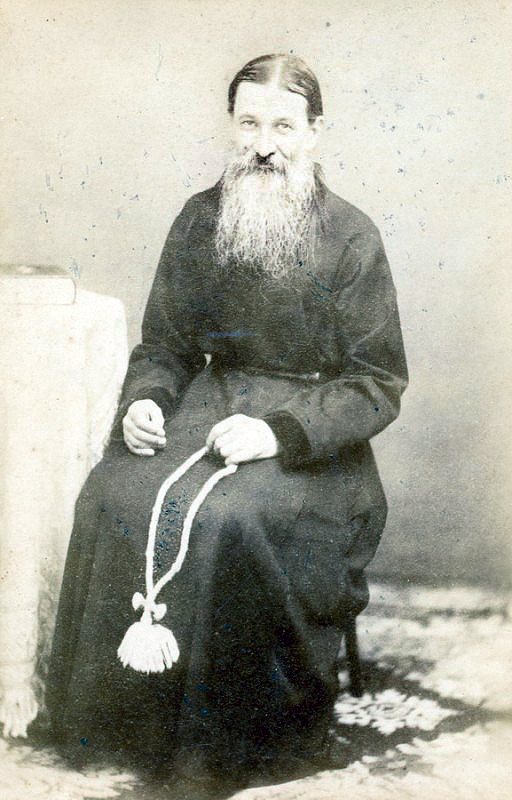
St. Joseph of Optina (†1911)

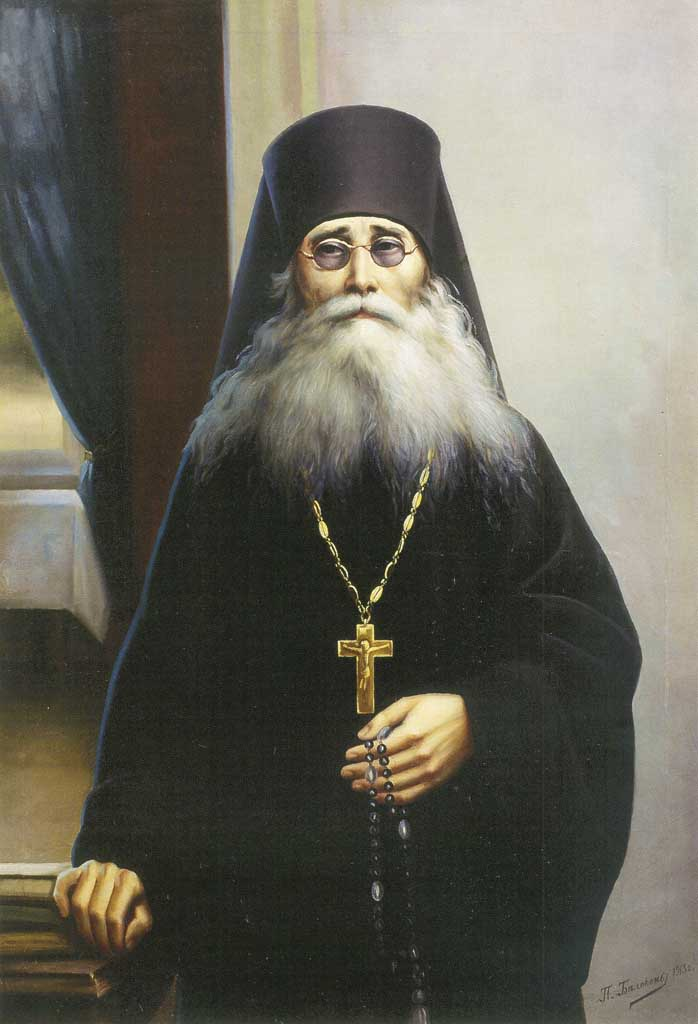
St. Barsanuphius of Optina (†1913)

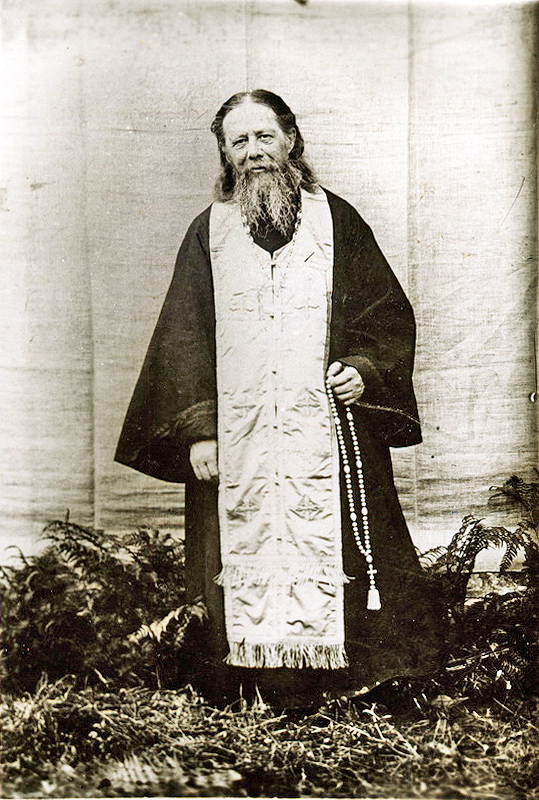
St. Anatole II the "Younger" of Optina (†1922)

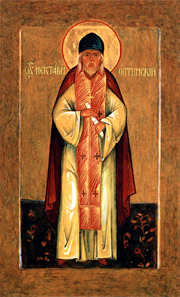
St. Nektary of Optina (†1928)

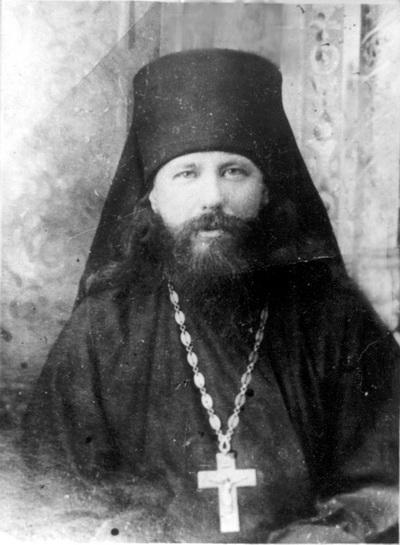
St. Nikon of Optina (†1931)

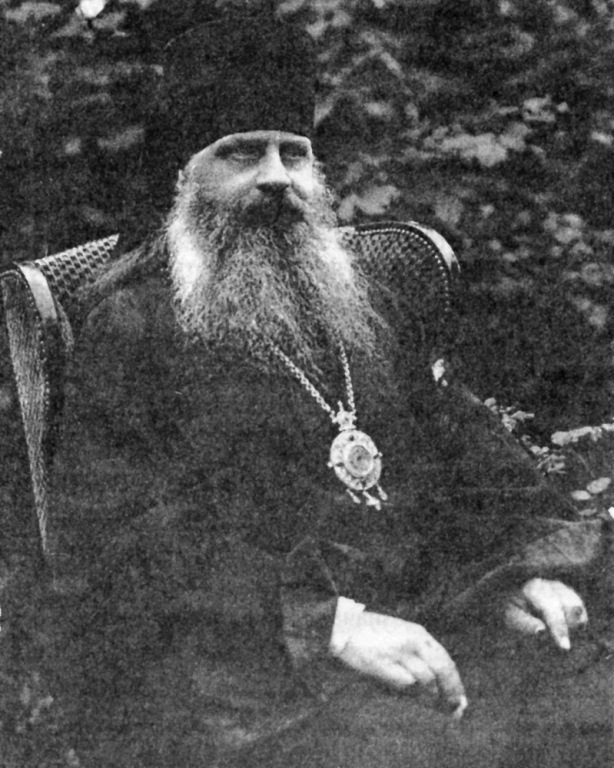
New Hieromartyr Juvenalius (Maslovsky), Bishop of Riazan.

== Sources ==
- October 11/24. Orthodox Calendar (PRAVOSLAVIE.RU).
- October 24 / October 11. HOLY TRINITY RUSSIAN ORTHODOX CHURCH (A parish of the Patriarchate of Moscow).
- October 11. OCA - The Lives of the Saints.
- The Autonomous Orthodox Metropolia of Western Europe and the Americas (ROCOR). St. Hilarion Calendar of Saints for the year of our Lord 2004. St. Hilarion Press (Austin, TX). pp. 75–76.
- The Eleventh Day of the Month of October. Orthodoxy in China.
- October 11. Latin Saints of the Orthodox Patriarchate of Rome.
- The Roman Martyrology. Transl. by the Archbishop of Baltimore. Last Edition, According to the Copy Printed at Rome in 1914. Revised Edition, with the Imprimatur of His Eminence Cardinal Gibbons. Baltimore: John Murphy Company, 1916. pp. 314–315.
- Rev. Richard Stanton. A Menology of England and Wales, or, Brief Memorials of the Ancient British and English Saints Arranged According to the Calendar, Together with the Martyrs of the 16th and 17th Centuries. London: Burns & Oates, 1892. pp. 485–486.

Greek Sources

- Great Synaxaristes: (in Greek) 11 ΟΚΤΩΒΡΙΟΥ. ΜΕΓΑΣ ΣΥΝΑΞΑΡΙΣΤΗΣ.
- (in Greek) Συναξαριστής. 11 Οκτωβρίου. ECCLESIA.GR. (H ΕΚΚΛΗΣΙΑ ΤΗΣ ΕΛΛΑΔΟΣ).
- (in Greek) 11/10/2017. Ορθόδοξος Συναξαριστής.

Russian Sources

- (in Russian) 24 октября (11 октября). Православная Энциклопедия под редакцией Патриарха Московского и всея Руси Кирилла (электронная версия). (Orthodox Encyclopedia - Pravenc.ru).
- (in Russian) 11 октября по старому стилю / 24 октября по новому стилю. Русская Православная Церковь - Православный церковный календарь на 2016 год.
