= Church of the Transfiguration, Yekaterinburg =

Orthodox church in Sverdlovsk Oblast, Russia

Church of the Transfiguration
- Храм в честь Преображения Господня
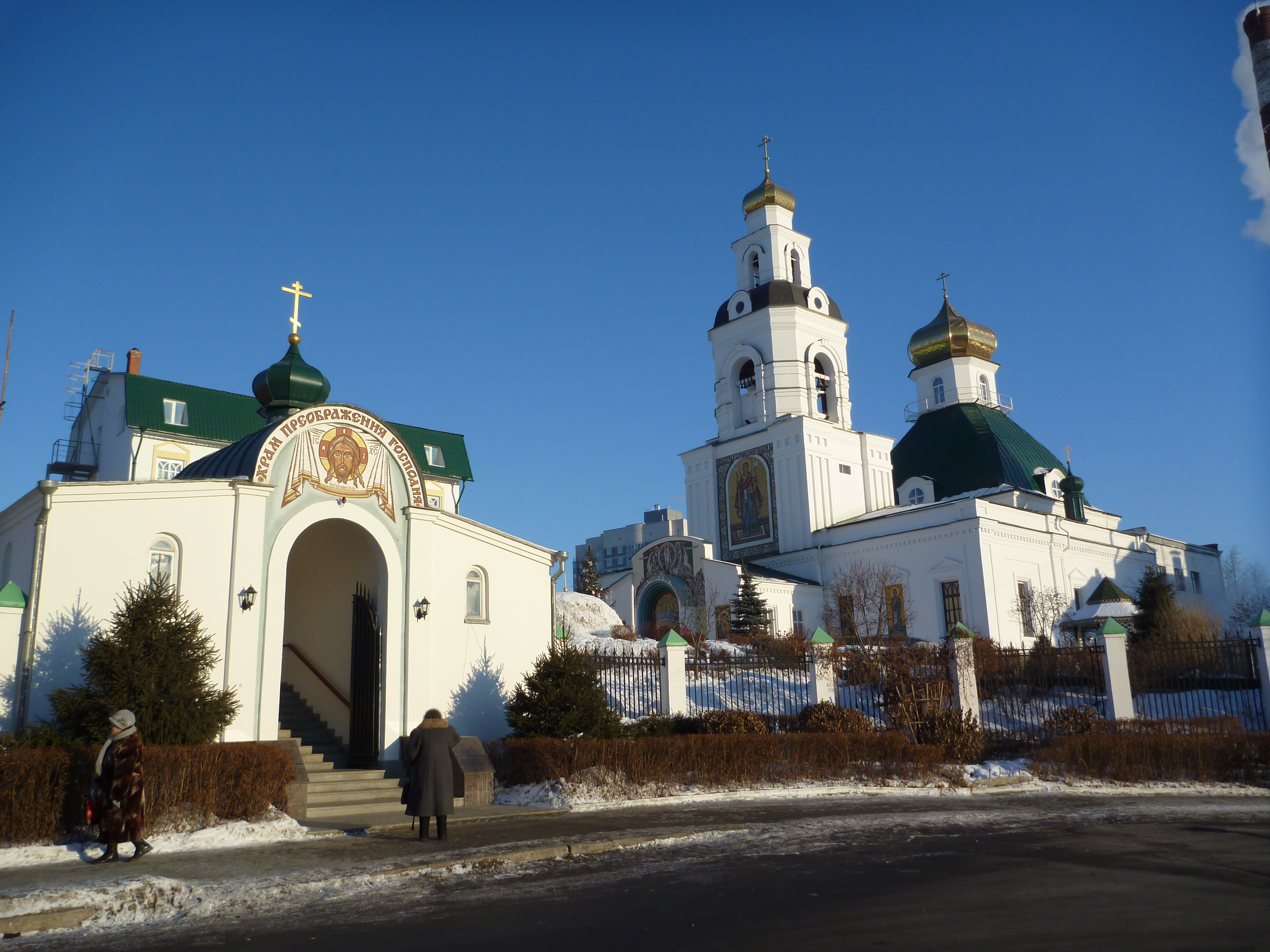
- Present view
- Church of the Transfiguration
- 56°46′51″N 60°38′57″E
- Location: Yekaterinburg (Sverdlovsk Oblast)
- Country: Russia
- Denomination: Eastern Orthodoxy
- Churchmanship: Russian Orthodox Church

History
- Status: active orthodox church
- Founded: 1807
- Dedication: Transfiguration of Jesus
- Consecrated: January 3, 1809 and April 21, 1830 (chapels); 1821 (main church)

Architecture
- Style: Russian Revival style
- Completed: 1830
- Closed: 1937 (reopened in 1995)

Specifications
- Materials: brick

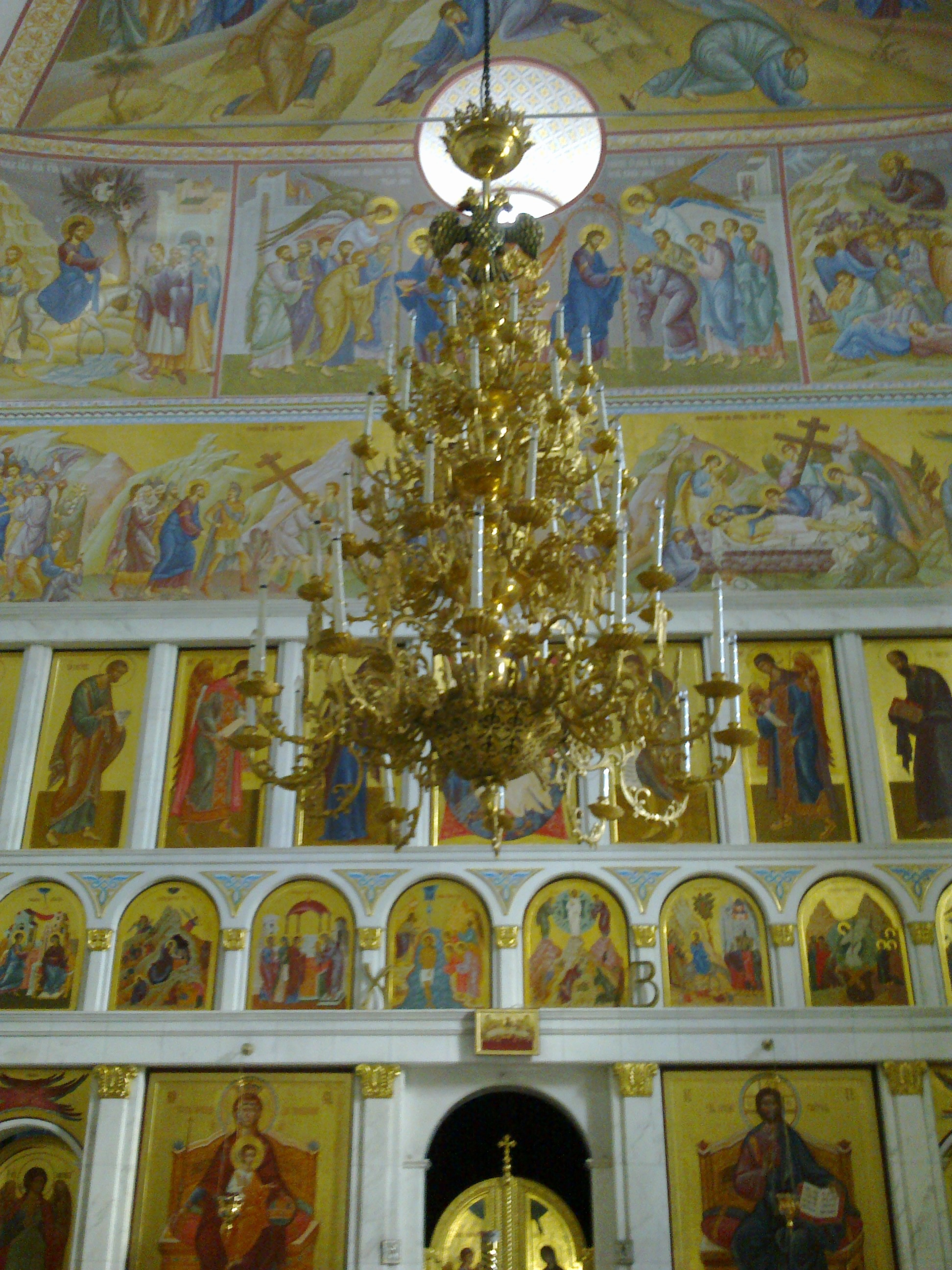
Interior of the church (2014)

The Church of the Transfiguration (Russian: Храм в честь Преображения Господня) is one of the oldest Orthodox churches in Yekaterinburg, Russia. Construction work on the church took place from 1808 to 1830. During Soviet times, it was devastated and converted into a rubber goods factory. It was reclaimed by the faithful in 1995.

== History ==
=== Russian Empire ===
The first church on the site of today's Church of the Transfiguration was built in 1712 and was dedicated to St. Nicholas. It was the first Orthodox place of worship in Yekaterinburg, constructed with the blessing of Metropolitan Siberia and Tobolsk, John. The building was made of wood, and the solemn consecration took place on 12 February 1712. (Note: Dates from the Russian Empire period are given in Old Style.) In 1747, the Church of St. Catherine burned down, making the Church of the Transfiguration (of St. Nicholas) once again the main place of worship for the Orthodox residents of the city. The wooden Epiphany Church was still under construction, so to relieve the Church of the Transfiguration and provide broader access to services for the city's residents, its construction was expedited. On 27 September 1807, after almost a hundred years of existence, the Church of St. Nicholas in Yekaterinburg burned down. From the fire, a silver chalice, paten, Gospel Book, cross, ciborium, as well as lamps and candlesticks, were saved. A bell weighing about 40 poods melted. After assessing the damage and clearing the site, construction of a new place of worship began quickly.

In 1808, on the site of the former wooden church dedicated to St. Nicholas, a new brick building of the church was erected. The construction was blessed by Justin, the bishop of the Perm Diocese, under whose jurisdiction Yekaterinburg was at that time. Due to the climatic conditions of the Ural region, liturgical services were to be held in different chapels during the winter and summer months. On 3 January 1809, the southern chapel dedicated to Our Lady of Kazan was consecrated. In 1821, the main altar, dedicated to the Transfiguration of Jesus, was consecrated, which gave the entire church its name. On 21 April 1830, the northern chapel dedicated to St. Nicholas was consecrated. During this period, a parish cemetery also formed around the church.

At this time, three eukterions were placed around the church building. The first was located by a bridge over one of the nearby rivers. It was a brick structure dedicated to St. Nicholas. Another was built in 1850 near the church itself and was dedicated to the Feast of the Ascension. The third was erected in 1836 and dedicated on the Feast of the Transfiguration. All three chapels were destroyed during Soviet times. In the 1860s, due to the increasing number of worshippers attending services, it became apparent that the church building was too small to accommodate everyone. Therefore, the church was renovated, and new chapels were built on either side, creating more space in its central part, eliminating the overcrowding. The work began on 12 May 1863. The chapel of Our Lady of Kazan was reconsecrated on 27 September 1864, and the chapel of St. Nicholas on 20 April 1867.

In 1868, Alexei Mikhailovich Pleshanov, a merchant from Rostov, funded the construction of a stone building for the parish, which was used as a parish school, and donated 300 rubles. The school was maintained by church funds and private donations from the faithful. In 1910, W. Zlokazov donated 250 rubles to it. The school taught church singing, Russian language, and arithmetic, and also organized lectures for the local population. From 1910, the parish of the Church of the Transfiguration worked to promote temperance among the city's residents. In 1914, on the Feast of the Transfiguration, the church became the destination of a citywide pilgrimage from Yekaterinburg's parish communities. The Divine Liturgy was celebrated by a bishop, and the walls of the church could not hold all the faithful who filled the square in front of it.

In 1915, the parish had about 2,500 members. It owned two brick houses and had 17 dessiatins. The clergy consisted of one presbyter, one deacon, and one reader. The diocesan archives contain documents about the salaries of the clergy at that time. The presbyter received a monthly salary of 295 rubles, the deacon 150 rubles, the reader 59 rubles and 48 kopecks, and the person baking the prosphora received 24 rubles and 54 kopecks for their service. The parish's income at that time was 1,310 rubles and 30 kopecks.

=== Soviet times ===
The fall of the Russian Empire and the October Revolution in 1917, followed by the Russian Civil War, radically altered the situation for the parish community centered around the Church of the Transfiguration in Yekaterinburg. The Bolshevik authorities began persecuting Orthodoxy, which also affected the local clergy. The church faced actions such as the opening of relics and the confiscation of property. In 1926, the municipal authorities handed the church building over to the Grigoriyev schism, who used it until the church was closed. The clergy also faced persecution; in 1937, former parish priest Iason Frolov (born 1873, ordained in 1898) was arrested and subsequently sentenced to ten years in the Gulag. On 25 March 1930, part of the church's dome was demolished, and soon after, its bell tower was also taken down. In 1937, the church was stripped of its remaining decorations and liturgical items and then closed.

On 26 November 1938, the authorities in Sverdlovsk (Note: In 1924, Yekaterinburg was renamed Sverdlovsk, and the old name was returned in 1991.) transferred the former church buildings to a nearby industrial plant. Their value was assessed at 114,500 rubles. After the German invasion of the Soviet Union, a Moscow factory producing rubber goods was evacuated to this area. The interior of the building was completely redesigned for industrial production. The previously open spaces were divided into floors, some windows were bricked up, walls were erected, and electrical and heating systems, as well as piping, were installed. On 26 May 1944, a fire broke out in the factory. The accumulation of many flammable chemical materials caused the fire to spread quickly throughout the former church building. The structure survived, but the interior of the former church was completely destroyed. After the war, the building continued to house the factory.

=== Recovery and restoration ===
The situation of the former Church of the Transfiguration began to change only with the dissolution of the Soviet Union and the transformations that occurred in the Russian Federation in the 1990s. Even towards the end of the Soviet era, the Orthodox church began to regain its former places of worship. On 1 June 1993, Archbishop Melchizedek announced plans to revive the former parish centered around the Church of the Transfiguration. In 1994, the factory authorities, which occupied the building of the former church, cleared it of industrial equipment. It was announced that the church would be returned to the Orthodox faithful. The church was in a very poor technical condition. There were doubts about whether the restoration would even be possible. Years of industrial and chemical production had destroyed the historic interiors and made them unrecognizable from their former glory. Additionally, the central part of the church, with the former dome, was at risk of collapse.

In March 1995, even before the official transfer of the building to the Russian Orthodox Church, the restoration began. In just a few weeks, provisional repairs were made, including the floors and an altar, an iconostasis were set up, a cross was placed on the roof, and the interiors were cleaned. The haste aimed to prepare the building for Easter services, which were celebrated at the end of April. In May, a special stele was erected near the church, dedicated to the deceased and fallen workers of the nearby factory. Meanwhile, renovation work continued to prepare the church for another major celebration, the Feast of the Holy Trinity. The building and adjacent areas were handed over to the reactivated parish just before the Feast of the Transfiguration, which falls on August 19 according to the Gregorian calendar. A special technical commission also issued an opinion that the crack in the central part of the building (near the remains of the former dome) did not pose a risk of collapse, which allowed regular liturgical services to be held. Renovation work progressed with the financial support of the faithful, as well as donations from local businesses. Floors were replaced, walls were restored, the destroyed dome and bell tower were rebuilt, and the building was connected to the heating and sewage system. From 1997 to 1998, iconostases were purchased for the renovated chapels (also thanks to the generosity of sponsors, including the Yekaterinburg branch of Lukoil). A church choir, a Sunday school for children and adults, and a parish library were also established. By 2001, most of the renovation work was completed, both inside and outside the church. On 6 January 2012, a new, largest church bell to date was consecrated. It was cast in Kamensk-Uralsky.

== The church today ==
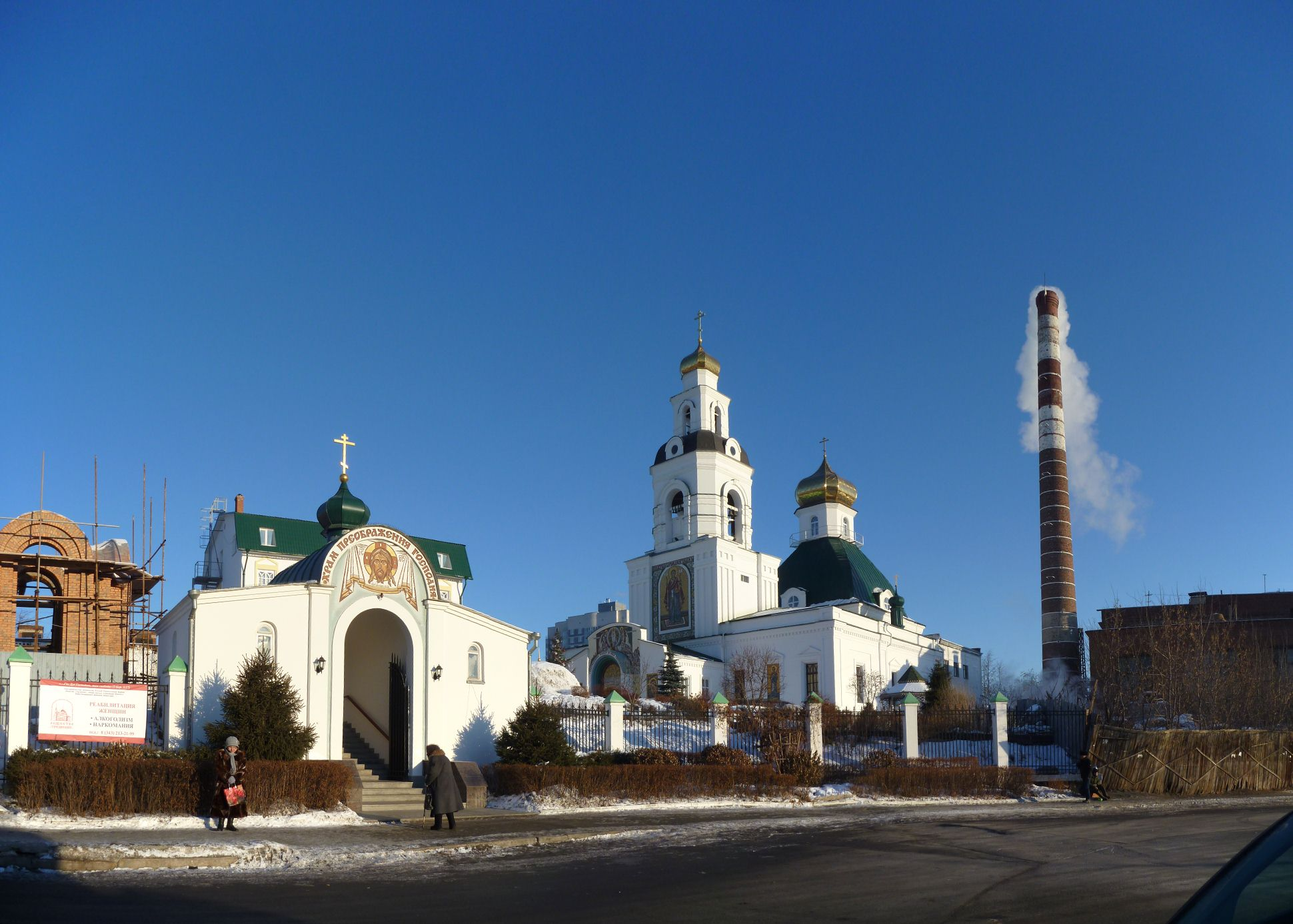
Church of the Transfiguration in 2012. On the right there is a distinctive industrial chimney

The church is situated in the Uktus area, part of the Chkalovsky Oblast. A distinctive feature near the Church of the Transfiguration is the chimney of one of the nearby industrial plants, which gives the impression of being an integral part of the building. The church houses three reliquaries containing relics of various Orthodox saints. The first reliquary holds relics of saints such as Mitrophan of Voronezh, Tikhon of Zadonsk, Vladimir Bogoyavlensky, Job of Pochayev, Innocent of Alaska, Philaret Drozdov, and Nicholas Sviatosha. The second reliquary includes relics of saints such as Herman of Solovki, Theodosius of Chernigov, and Kuksha of Odessa. The third reliquary contains relics of the Optina Elders, including Isaac I, Ambrose, Moses, Nectarius, and Anthony. One of the church's most venerated icons is the Icon of the Mother of God Pantanassa (All-Queen). The church also houses icons of the aforementioned Optina Elders, Matrona Nikonova, the Crucifixion of Christ, and the Massacre of the Innocents.

Special prayers are held in the church for unborn children and for women who have undergone abortions. With the blessing of Archbishop Vincent of Yekaterinburg, a chapel dedicated to the Holy Martyr Children of Bethlehem was built near the church. The chapel is intended as a place for prayer and penance, and the parish provides support to women in difficult life situations. Construction began in 2011 and lasted about eighteen months. On 21 July 2011, the site was consecrated and the cornerstone was laid. On 27 October 2012, Metropolitan Cyril of Yekaterinburg blessed the crosses and dome of the future chapel. The chapel was solemnly consecrated by him on 12 January 2013.

The parish is also active in charitable work, providing assistance to the poor and needy through fundraising and charity auctions. Support is given to large and homeless families. The church operates a Sunday school for children and adults, with a three-year educational program. A parish library, initially established in 1995 with about 500 religious volumes, grew to approximately 14,000 volumes by 2010. The Divine Liturgy is celebrated daily, and all sacraments are available to the faithful.

On 21 May 2012, the parish celebrated the 300th anniversary of the establishment of the first church on the site of the current Church of the Transfiguration. The festivities were attended by Metropolitan Cyril and other hierarchs of the Orthodox church from the Yekaterinburg diocese. The Feast of the Transfiguration sees a large influx of faithful, and despite the church's capacity to hold several hundred people, many worshippers have to attend services outside in the churchyard. On 16 August 2012, Metropolitan Cyril presided over the Divine Liturgy for the feast. The Church of the Transfiguration is one of the most visited religious sites in Yekaterinburg, with nearly a thousand worshippers attending liturgical services on Sundays and feast days.
