= Isaac I of Optina =

19th-century Russian Orthodox monk

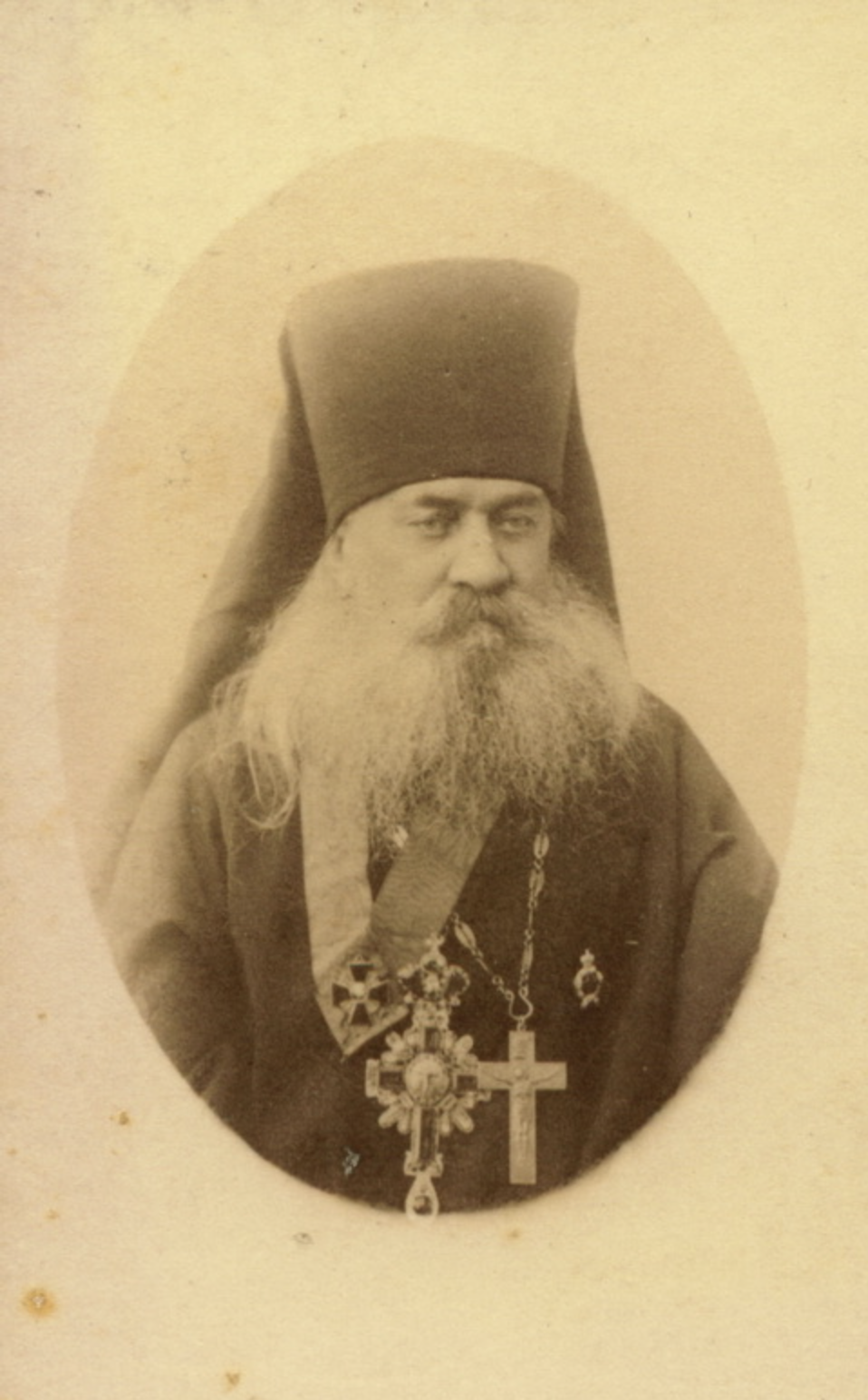
- Portrait of Elder Isaac from the 1880s.

Ivan Ivanovich Antimonov
- Born: 31 May 1810; Kursk, Russia
- Residence: Optina Hermitage, Kozelsk, Russia
- Died: 22 August 1894; Optina Hermitage, Kozelsk, Russia
- Honored in: Eastern Orthodox Church
- Canonized: 7 August 2000 by Russian Orthodox Church
- Major shrine: Relics located in Kazan Church of Optina Monastery
- Feast: 22 August
- Attributes: Hegumen, Starets
- Influences: Ambrose of Optina

Schema-archimandrite Isaac I of Optina (Russian: Схиархимандрит Исаакий Антимонов), or Ivan Ivanovich Antimonov before tonsure, was the superior of Optina Hermitage from 1862 to 1894.

Ivan Ivanovich entered monastic life at the Skete of St John the Forerunner in 1847; he had no formal education, but read widely and learned from the other monks.

On 5 October 1854, he was tonsured into the mantle and took the name Isaac; in 1858 he became a hieromonk.

In 1862 the abbot of Optina died and Isaac was chosen to lead the monastery; during his time as leader, the monastery completed building the Church of All Saints, built a guest house and a monastery hospital with a free pharmacy, opened a bookshop and completed a new water system.

He was made archimandrite in 1885.

He died on 22 August 1894.

Elder Isaac is venerated as a saint in the Eastern Orthodox Church.
