= Elias Nozdrin =

Russian schema-archimandrite

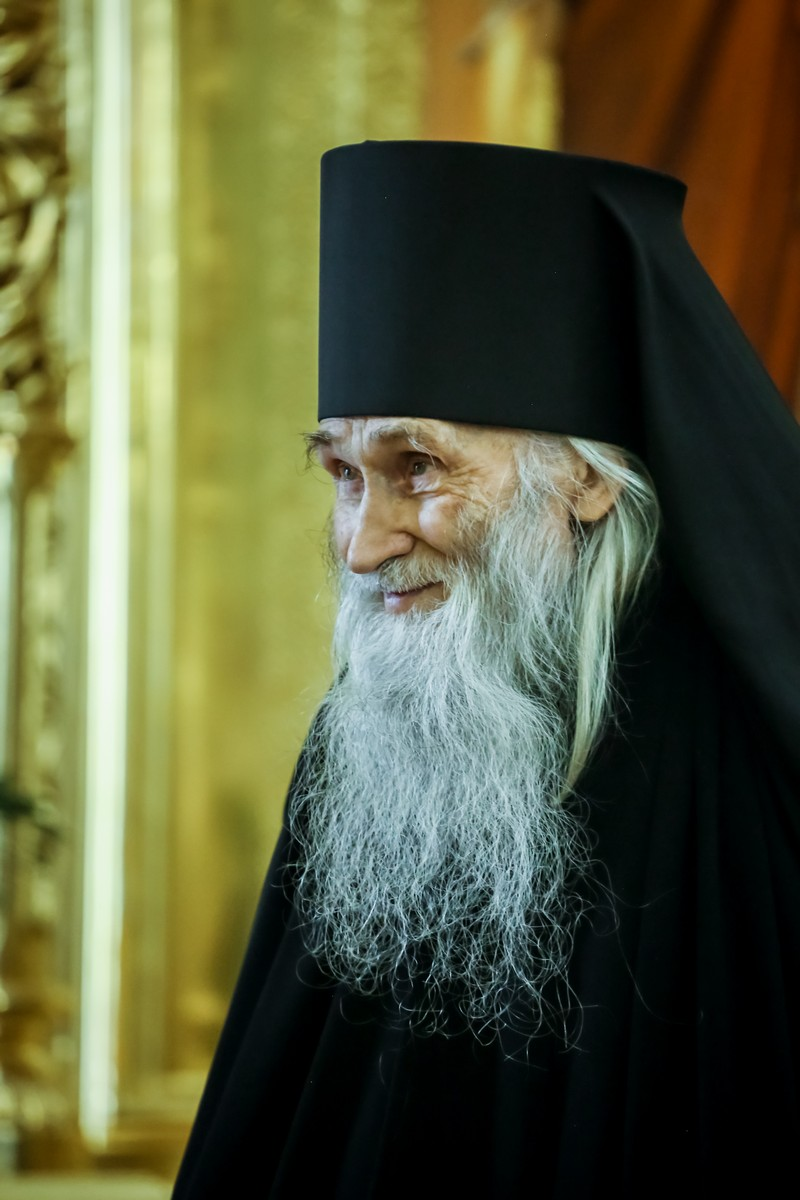
Elias Nozdrin

Schema-archimandrite Elias (Ilie, Russian: Схиархимандрит Илий, secular name Alexey Afanasyevich Nozdrin, Russian: Алексей Афанасьевич Ноздрин; 1932–2025) was a schema-archimandrite and elder (starets) of the Optina Monastery of Russian Orthodox Church.

He was born in 1932 in the village of Redkino, Central Black Earth Oblast (now Oryol Oblast) to peasant parents. The name Alexey was given to the boy in honour of St. Alexius of Rome.

In a 2022 broadcast on the Spas TV Channel, Father Elias Nozdrin recounted how, as a 10-year-old boy, he had picked up maps that had fallen from a German car and gave them to a captured Red Army soldier who had managed to escape. The soldier passed them on to Konstantin Rokossovsky, and this find proved decisive in issuing an urgent order to open fire on the enemy fortifications marked on the maps, which helped the Red Army achieve victory in the Battle of Kursk.

In 1949, he graduated from secondary school in his native village. He served in the army, where a sergeant persuaded him to join the Komsomol. Upon returning home, he deeply repented of this, seeing it as a sin against God, and immediately burned his Komsomol membership card. From 1955 to 1958, he studied at a mechanical engineering technical school in Serpukhov and, after graduation, was assigned to work in the city of Kamyshin, Volgograd Oblast. He attended the only functioning church in the city, dedicated to St. Nicholas. After the closure of the Saratov Seminary in 1961, he was transferred to the Leningrad Seminary and later graduated from the Leningrad Theological Academy, where he first met Vladimir Gundyayev, the future Patriarch Kirill of Moscow.

On 13 March 1966, he was tonsured a monk by Metropolitan Nikodim Rotov and given the name Elias in honor of one of the Forty Martyrs of Sebaste. Later, he was successively ordained hierodeacon and hieromonk by Metropolitan Nikodim Rotov. He carried out his service in various churches of the Leningrad Diocese.

From 1966 to 1976, he spent time at the Pskov-Caves Monastery, and under the influence of reading a book about Silouan the Athonite, he decided to enter the St. Panteleimon Monastery on Mount Athos. By a decision of the Holy Synod on 3 March 1976, Hieromonk Elias, along with other monks, was sent to carry out monastic obedience at the Russian St. Panteleimon Monastery on Athos. There, together with other residents, he managed to preserve monastic life in the monastery, maintain its connection with Russian Orthodoxy, and prevent its closure. He carried out obedience in a skete hidden in mountain gorges. He lived in Old Russik and served as the confessor of the St. Panteleimon Monastery.

In 1989, he was called back to Russia and sent as a confessor to the Optina Monastery, which was being restored after 65 years of desolation. The abbot of the monastery, Archimandrite Eulogius Smirnov, tonsured him into the Great Schema.

Following the 2009 Local Council of the Russian Orthodox Church, Eleas was chosen as the confessor of the newly elected Patriarch Kirill of Moscow, who was his fellow student at the Leningrad Theological Academy. He settled at the Patriarchal Metochion of the Trinity Lavra of St. Sergius in the village of Peredelkino, Moscow Oblast.

On 4 April 2010, on Easter Sunday, in the Cathedral of Christ the Saviour in Moscow, he was elevated to the rank of Schema-Archimandrite by Patriarch Kirill.

He died on 15 March 2025, at the age of 93.

On 18 March 2025, a funeral service was held at the Kazan Church of the Optina Monastery, led by Patriarch Kirill.

Elias was buried near the Resurrection Chapel at the Optina Monastery.

== Positions ==
Father Elias Nozdrin spoke out against communism and Stalinism, calling Stalin a bandit and considering his role in the country's history, including the entire period of the World War II, as unequivocally negative. He opposed the erection of monuments to Stalin, speaking of the revival of Stalinism as a "turn towards ruin, towards the destruction of Russia". He referred to Vladimir Lenin as a "hater of the Russian people, a villain among villains". Elias considered communists to be enemies of God, with whom a Christian must do battle. According to him, who cited John Krestiankin, around 95 million human lives were sacrificed in the struggle for the "bright future" of the communist idea in the world.

Elias held a positive view of Boris Yeltsin, whom he compared to St. George, and credited him with restoring the role of the Russian Orthodox Church in Russia.

Elias actively supported the Russian invasion of Ukraine, repeatedly expressing his support for the Russian authorities and calling Vladimir Putin a God-chosen leader. In his view, ban of abortions, prohibition of foul language, and Lenin's body burial are the three things necessary for Russia's victory in the Russo-Ukrainian war.

== Awards ==
- Order of Honour (2019)
- Order of Saint Vladimir of the Russian Orthodox Church, 2nd class (2022)
