= Shamordino =

Shamordino may refer to the following:

- The Kazan St Ambrose Convent in Kaluga Oblast
- The village of Shamordino, Zhukovka District, Kaluga Oblast, near which the convent is located.
- The Nuns of Shamordino Prisoners of Solovki who were prisoners in the Soviet gulags beginning in 1923.
