= Konstantin Leontiev =

Russian philosopher (1831–1891)

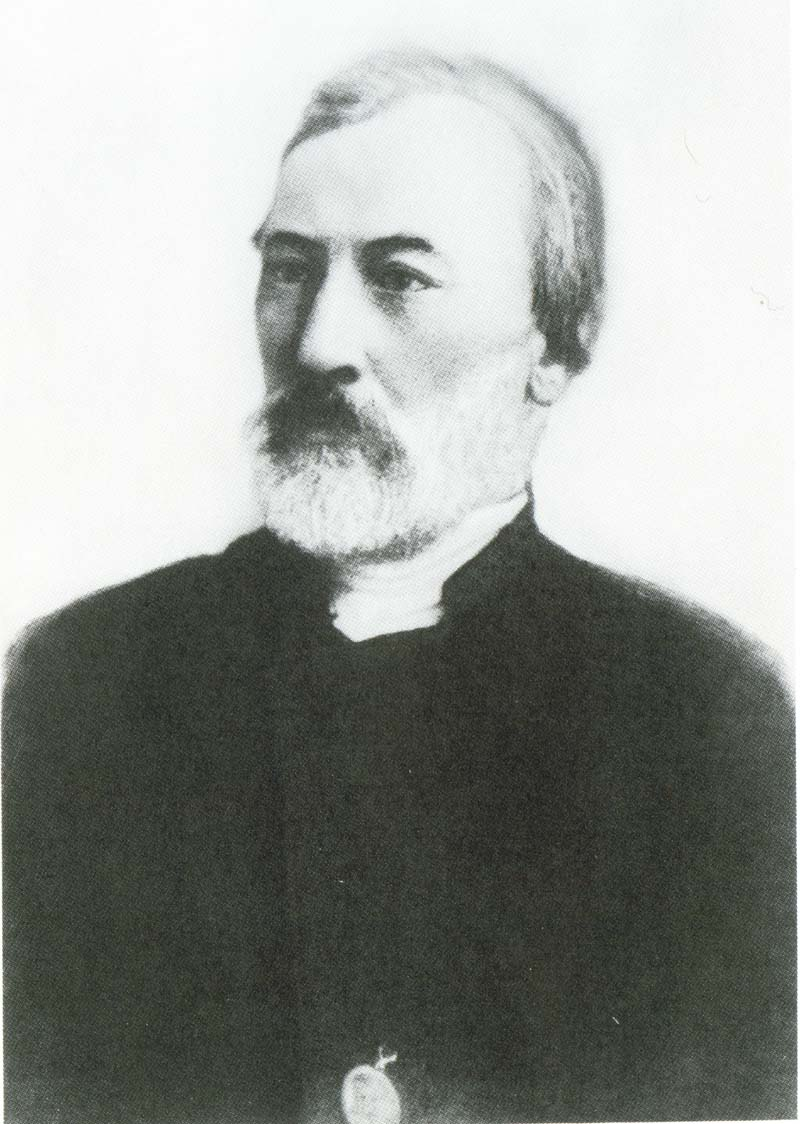
Russian philosopher Konstantin Leontiev in 1880

Konstantin Nikolayevich Leontiev, monastic name: Clement (Russian: Константи́н Никола́евич Лео́нтьев; 25 January 1831 – 24 November 1891) was a conservative tsarist and imperial monarchist Russian philosopher who advocated closer cultural ties between Russia and the East against what he believed to be the West's catastrophic egalitarian, utilitarian and revolutionary influences. He also advocated Russia's cultural and territorial expansion eastward to India, Tibet and China.

== Life ==
Leontiev was born and grew up on his father's estate in Kudinovo, Kaluga Governorate. His father, a nobleman, was a military officer but was discharged for "riotous behaviour". Still, the intervention of the Russian empress in behalf of the Leontiev brothers made him able to enter the Imperial Corps of Pages. He was engaged at 23 but broke off the relationship for the sake of "freedom and art" – a decision that made things difficult for him. After completing medical school in Moscow, Leontiev saw service as a doctor during the Crimean War.

In 1861, he carried off a local Crimean girl, the daughter of a Greek merchant, from Feodosiya, eventually marrying her.

He later lived in various Ottoman towns as a Russian consular agent, devoting his leisure time to writing oriental fiction on many themes, some of which included a condemnation of anti-homosexuality and implied that he may have been bisexual. In the summer of 1871, after praying to the Virgin Mary, he was cured of cholera and dysentery and promised her he would take monastic vows. Later that autumn, he moved to the Russian monastery on Mount Athos. In 1880, he moved to the censorship department in Moscow, where he published several acclaimed analyses of Leo Tolstoy's novels.

Seven years later, he secretly took the tonsure at the Optina monastery, famous for its startsy. He died as a monk in the Troitse-Sergiyeva Lavra.

Leontiev died on 24 November 1891 in Sergiyev Posad from pneumonia.

== Works and political thought ==
Leontiev's most remarkable book is a volume of essays, The East, Russia, and Slavdom (1885–1886). Like Nikolay Danilevsky and Fyodor Dostoyevsky before him, he was ill at ease with the Western consumer society and the cult of material prosperity. Leontiev regarded traditional Russian Byzantinism as a blessing and a strong antidote against further liberalisation of the country's society. His aesthetic and political theories had some similarities to those of Friedrich Nietzsche and Oswald Spengler. Preceding the latter's theory of the cyclical nature of civilizations and The Decline of the West by several decades, Leontiev proposed that all societies undergo a state of flowering and increasing complexity followed by one of "secondary simplification", decay and, ultimately, death. Leontiev felt that the West had reached the beginning of secondary simplification. In politics, Leontiev was a supporter of tsarist absolutism and the rule of the aristocratic gentry in Russia and vehemently criticized other Slavophiles who he believed had fallen to "utopianism" for supporting the emancipation of the serfs in the 1860s. According to him, all great religions were ‘‘doctrines of pessimism sanctioning suffering, wrongs, and the injustices of life on earth.”

A pessimist, during the final years of his life Leontiev lost his faith in humanity’s ability to create a distinctive new cultural type. In his catastrophic predictions, he prophesied that in the 20th century, there would be a bloody revolution in Russia led by an "anti-Christ" that would be socialist and tyrannical in nature and whose rulers would wield even more power than their tsarist predecessors. He said, "Socialism is the feudalism of the future." He felt that only the harshest reaction could prevent that scenario.

== See also ==
- Russian philosophy
- Sobornost

== Sources ==
- Against the Current: Selected Writings, Konstantin Leontiev, Wybright and Talley Publishers, New York, 1969.
