= Starets =

Eastern Orthodox Christian spiritual figure

A starets (Russian: стáрец [ˈstarʲɪt͡s]; fem. Russian: ста́рица, romanized: staritsa) is a Christian elder of an Eastern Orthodox or Eastern Catholic monastery or convent who functions as venerated adviser and teacher. Elders or spiritual fathers are charismatic spiritual leaders whose wisdom stems from God as obtained from ascetic experience. It is believed that through ascetic struggle, prayer and hesychasm, the Holy Spirit bestows special gifts onto the elder including the ability to heal, prophesy, and most importantly, give effective spiritual guidance and direction. Elders are looked upon as being an inspiration to believers and an example of saintly virtue, steadfast faith, and spiritual peace.

Elders are not appointed by any authority; they are simply recognized by the faithful as being people "of the Spirit". An elder, when not in prayer or in voluntary seclusion, receives visitors (some who travel very far) and spends time conversing with them, offering a blessing (In most cases, only if the elder is an ordained cleric) and confession, and praying. People often petition the elder for intercessionary prayers, believing that the prayer of an elder is particularly effective.

Personal confessions to elders are encouraged, although not all of them are ordained to the priesthood. Many of them have a reputation among believers of being able to know the secrets of a person's heart without having ever previously met the visitor, and having the ability to discern God's plan for a person's life. This, as all of the elder's gifts, is believed to come from the Holy Spirit acting through the elder.

== Derivation, history and application ==
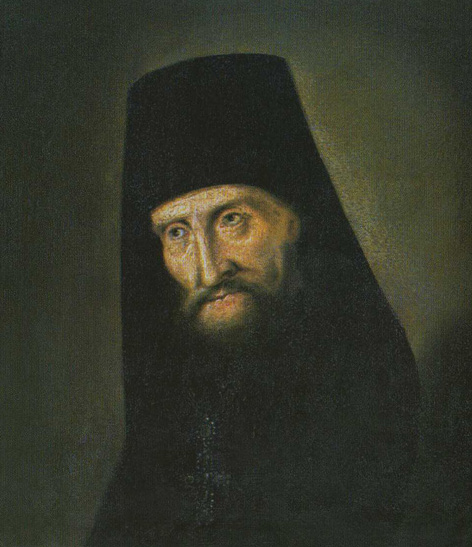
Hieromonk Amphilochius (1749–1824)

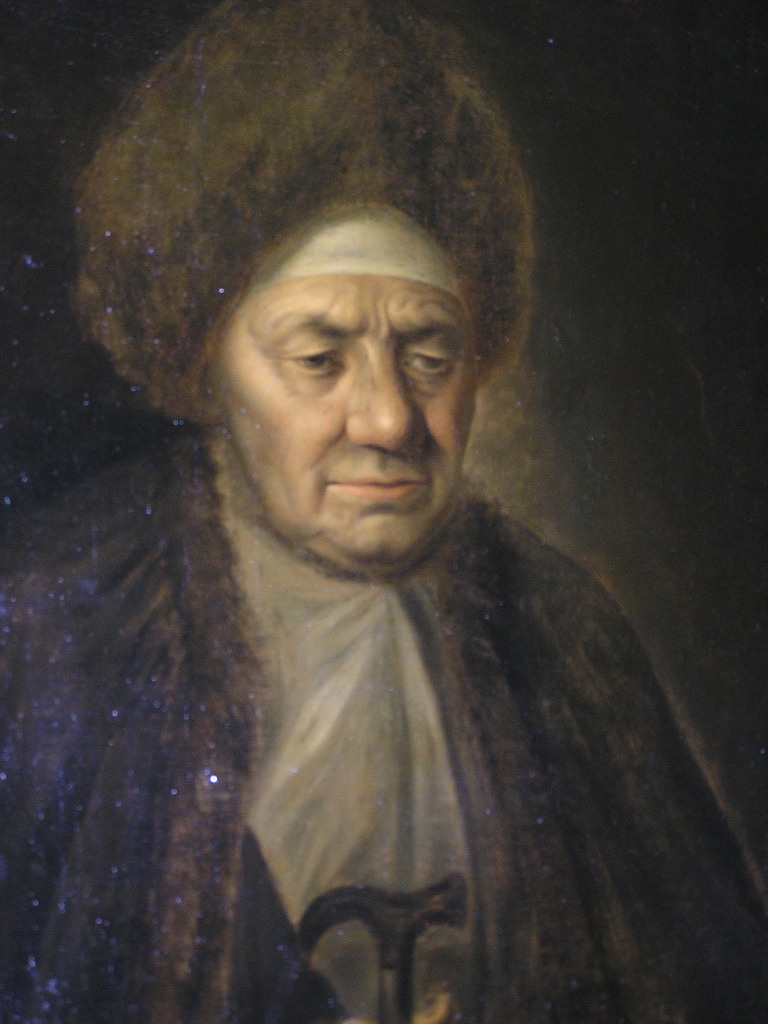
Martha Shestova (1560–1631)

The institution may be traced to the beginnings of Christian monasticism in the 4th century. The original Greek term geron (meaning "elder", as in gerontology) was rendered by the Russian word starets, from Old Church Slavonic starĭtsĭ, "elder", derived from starŭ, "old". The Greek tradition has a long unbroken history of elders and disciples, such as Sophronius and John Moschos in the seventh century, Symeon the Elder and Symeon the New Theologian in the eleventh century, and contemporary charismatic gerontes such as Porphyrios and Paisios. Sergius of Radonezh and Nil Sorsky were two most venerated startsy of Old Muscovy. The revival of elders in the Slavic world is associated with the name of Paisius Velichkovsky (1722–1794), who produced the Church Slavonic translation of selected texts of the Philokalia. The most famous Russian starets of the early 19th century was Seraphim of Sarov (1759–1833), who went on to become one of the most revered Orthodox saints.

The Optina Pustyn near Kozelsk used to be celebrated for its startsy (Schema-Archimandrite Moses, Schema-Hegumen Anthony, Hieroschemamonk Leonid, Hieroschemamonk Macarius, Hieroschemamonk Hilarion, Hieroschemamonk Ambrose, Hieroschemamonk Anatole (Zertsalov)). Such writers as Nikolay Gogol, Aleksey Khomyakov, Leo Tolstoy and Konstantin Leontyev sought advice from the elders of this monastery. They also inspired the figure of Zosima in Dostoyevsky's novel The Brothers Karamazov. Grigori Rasputin was styled starets by his followers, although he was not generally recognised as one. A more modern examples of starets are Archimandrite John Krestiankin (1910–2006) of the Pskov Monastery of the Caves and Schema-Archimandrite Elias Nozdrin (1932–2025) of the Optina Monastery who were popularly recognized as such by many Orthodox living in Russia.

The concept of the elder may be familiar to many Western readers through J. D. Salinger's Franny and Zooey. In the novel, one of the characters refers to the 19th century anonymous Russian work, The Way of a Pilgrim. The title character of The Way of a Pilgrim (ostensibly, the author) is advised in the progress of his spiritual life by an elder, who uses the Jesus Prayer as a starting point for spiritual discipline.

== Other meanings ==
In Bulgarian and several other South Slavic languages the word translates literally to "old man". A word with a meaning closer to the translation in Russian would be stareishina (Bulgarian: старейшина).

== In culture ==
=== Filmography ===
- The Island (2006)

== See also ==
- Desert Fathers
- Guru
- Hermit
- Hesychasm
- Poustinia
- Theosis (Eastern Orthodox theology)
- Theoria
- Spiritual warfare
- Spiritual direction
- Ambrose of Optina
- Christian mysticism
- Folk Orthodoxy

== Sources ==
- Irina Paert. Spiritual Elders. Charisma and Tradition in Russian Orthodoxy. DeKalb, Illinois: Northern Illinois University Press, 2010.
