= Kireyevsky brothers =

Kireyevsky brothers may refer to:

- Ivan Kireyevsky (1806–1856)
- Pyotr Kireevsky (1808–1856)
