= Order of Saint Vladimir of the Russian Orthodox Church =

Order of Saint Vladimir
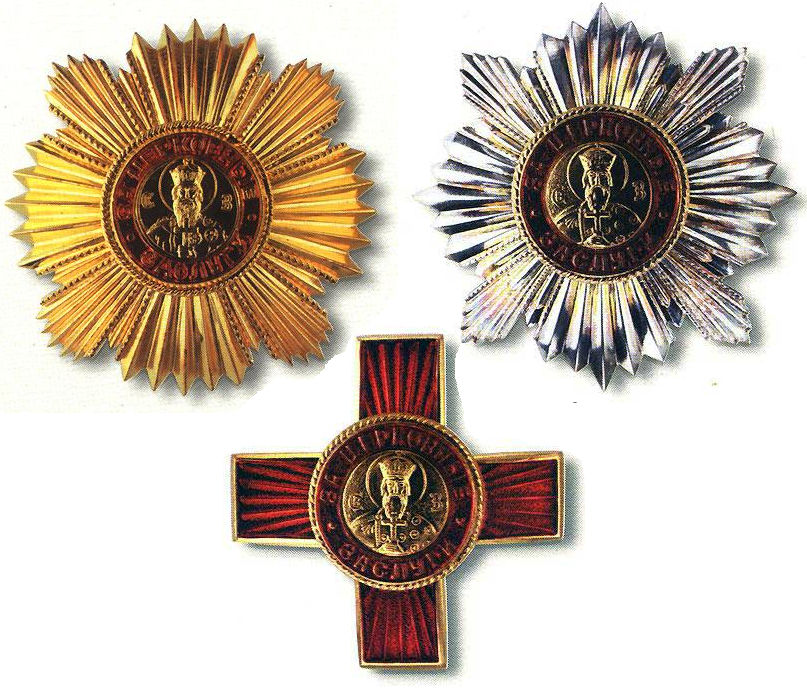

Awarded by Russian Orthodox Church
- Type: Church order
- Established: 1959
- Country: Russia
- Religious affiliation: Russian Orthodox Church
- Status: Active
- Grades: 1st, 2nd and 3rd classes

Precedence
- Next (higher): Order of St. Andrew the First-Called
- Next (lower): Order of Glory and Honour

The Order of Saint Vladimir of the Russian Orthodox Church (Russian: Орден Святого равноапостольного великого князя Владимира) was established by the Russian Orthodox Church in 1958, in commemoration of the 40th anniversary of the restoration of the Patriarchate in the Russian Church. Initially it was created as a Chest Badge of Saint Vladimir and was intended as an award for foreign Orthodox Churches and Churches of other denominations. It was reclassified as an order in 1959.

The first Soviet citizen awarded with the order was Patriarch Alexy I of Moscow in 1961.

Now the order is also awarded to churches, monasteries, religious educational institutions, dioceses, and other church establishments.

There are three degrees of the order. It has no relation to the Russian imperial Order of Saint Vladimir.

The orders of the first and second degree have the "star of the order" (Звезда ордена) and the "badge of the order" (Знак ордена) , the third degree has only the badge. The badges are gilded crosses with a medallion in the center. The stars are more ornate.

== Medal ==
In 2012 the medal of the order was introduced (of single degree). The medal is circular in shape with a narrow convex border along the edge, with a relief image of the Holy Equal-to-the-Apostles Prince Vladimir in the center.

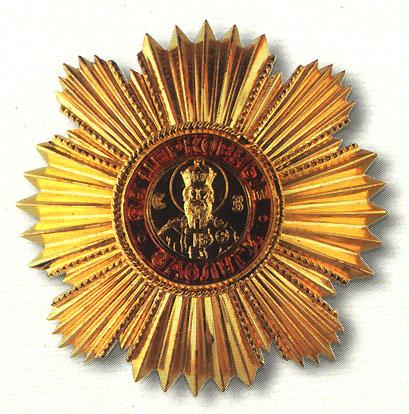
Star of the Order of Saint Vladimir, 1st degree

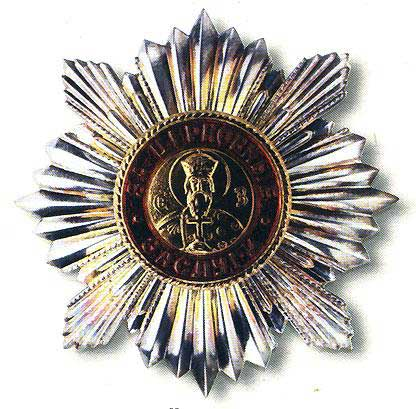
Star of the Order of Saint Vladimir, 2nd degree

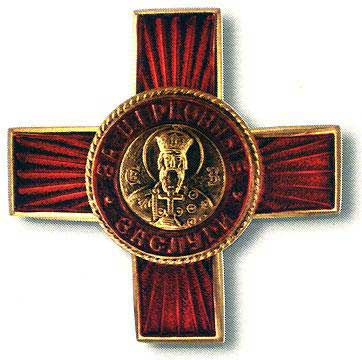
Badge of the Order of Saint Vladimir, 3rd degree

Medal of the Order
