= Lev of Optina =

Saint Lev of Optina
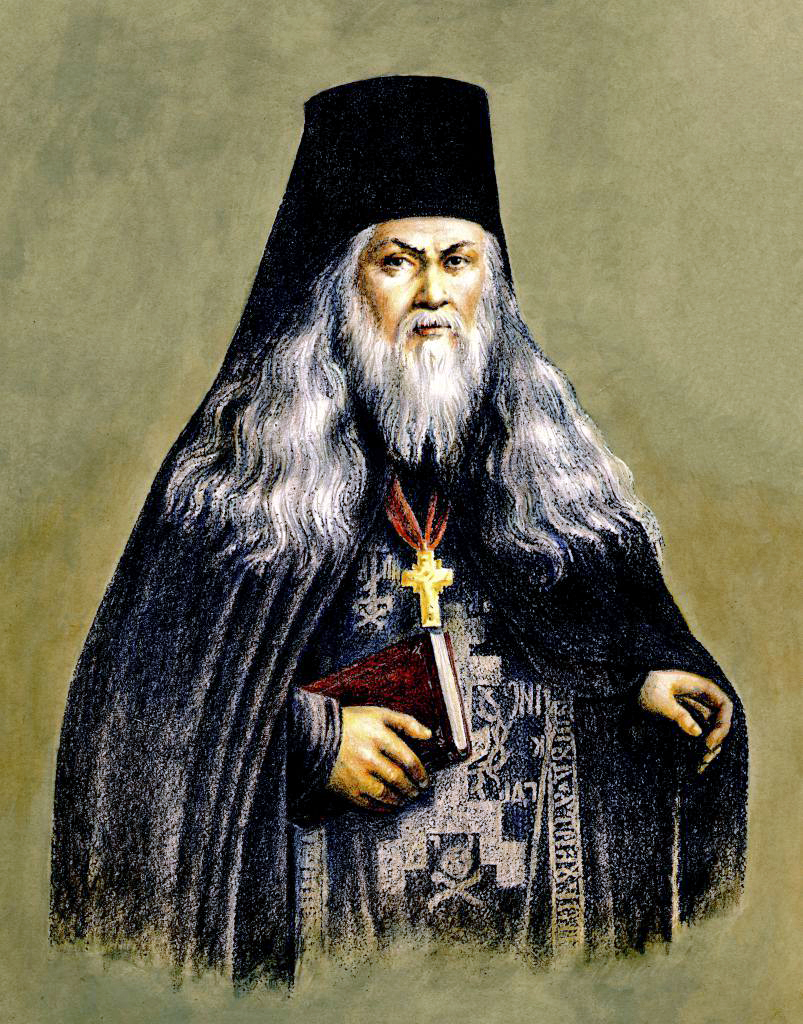
- Painting of St. Lev of Optina

Venerable Father
- Born: 1768; Russia
- Died: 24 October 1841; Optina Monastery
- Venerated in: Eastern Orthodoxy
- Canonized: 1990 by Russian Orthodox Church Abroad; 2000 by the Russian Orthodox Church
- Feast: 24 October [O.S. 11 October]
- Attributes: Clothed as a hieromonk, sometimes holding a scroll

Hieroschemamonk Leonid (Nagolkin) of Optina, also Leo (or Lev) of Optina, was a venerable elder of Optina Monastery and a founder of Optina's eldership.

== Life ==
The future St. Leonid was born Lev Danilovich Nagolkin in Karachev in the Orlov Province in 1768 of a family of ordinary parents. He worked for a merchant during his early years, making frequent trips as part of his employer's business, thus he gained experience dealing with different people. As a mature young man, Leo decided to enter a monastic life.

In 1797, Leo entered Optina Monastery as it was being reborn. After two years he left to enter White Bluff monastery in the Orlov eparchy, where Hieromonk Basil (Kiskin) was igumen. Under Fr. Basil, Leo underwent training in monastic virtues of obedience, patience, and various external endeavors. In 1801, Fr. Basil tonsured Leo a monk giving him the name Leonid. Later in the year Fr. Leonid was ordained a deacon on December 22 and then a priest on December 24.

Earnestly fulfilling his obediences, Fr. Leonid set an example to the other monastics. This attracted the notice of his superiors. Fr. Leonid also spent some time at Cholnsk monastery where he met Schemamonk Theodore, a disciple of St. Paisius Velichkovsky. Fr. Theodore, who was about ten years older than Fr. Leonid, was also from Karachev. Under his direction, Fr. Leonid learned a great deal about spiritual struggles and how to acquire the grace of the Holy Spirit.

In 1804, after only five years at White Bluff, he was appointed by Bishop Dorotheus of Orlov and Svensk to succeed Fr. Basil as igumen. The following year Fr. Theodore also came to White Bluff Monastery and Fr. Leonid once again shared conversations that inspired him to even greater progress in the spiritual life. Fr. Theodore, longing for solitude, received permission to establish his cell, with his disciple Cleopas, about a mile from the monastery. There, Fr. Leonid joined Fr. Theodore in 1808 after resigning as igumen and became a schema-monk with the name of Leo.

The fame of the three ascetics, however, brought many visitors and distractions from their spiritual struggles, causing them to look elsewhere. In 1809, Fr. Theodore moved, first, to New Lake Monastery, then, on to the Palei Island Hermitage, where he remained for three years before again moving, in 1812, to the All Saints Skete of Valaam Monastery. There, he was reunited with Frs. Leonid and Cleopas who had also moved there in 1812. In 1816, Hieroschemamonk Cleopas died, and Fr. Leonid and Fr. Theodore moved to the St. Alexander of Svir monastery.

Fr. Theodore reposed on Bright Friday, April 7, 1822. With Fr. Theodore's death, Fr. Leonid looked to a more secluded place. In his search Fr. Leonid and his disciples came to Ploschansky Hermitage where he met Fr. Macarius. A few years later, Fr. Leonid accepted the invitation of Fr. Moses to come to Optina Monastery. He arrived at Optina in April 1829 with six of his disciples. They were given cells in the Skete, Fr. Leonid near the apiary and his disciples elsewhere in the Skete.

The arrival of Fr. Leonid marked a new chapter in the history of Optina, as it was Fr. Leonid who introduced eldership at the monastery. Guidance by an Elder had been recognized as a sure and reliable path to salvation. It spread from the deserts of Egypt and Palestine to Mount Athos, and later to Russia. Fr. Leonid received this teaching from Fr. Theodore, the disciple of St. Paisius Velichkovsky. Through Fr. Leonid and his disciple St. Macarius, who had followed him to Optina in 1834, eldership was established at Optina Monastery.

Fr. Leonid's wisdom and spiritual counsels made him known outside of Optina. People of all social classes flocked to Optina seeking his help. He treated their spiritual afflictions with the knowledge and experience he had gained after thirty years of living in asceticism. During the times from 1835 to 1836 some monks who did not understand the concept of eldership complained to the bishop about Fr. Leonid. They were unhappy of the many visitors who came to him and that his actions disrupted the peaceful routine of the monastery. In 1841, he also came entangled in jealousies among the nuns over his spiritual counsel that resulted in the expulsion of Mother Anthia and one of the other sisters from the convent based on erroneous opinions. It was with the intervention of Metropolitan Philaret (Amphiteatrov) of Kiev that the expelled sisters were received back into the convent on October 4, 1841.

In September 1841, Fr. Leonid's health began to decline. He received Holy Unction on September 15, and from that time he began to prepare for death. He received Holy Communion on September 28 and, taking no food and little water, he was strengthened only by the life-giving Mysteries of Christ. During the evening of October 11, 1841, he closed his eyes and surrendered his soul to God.

On October 13, Fr. Moses served the funeral with all the hieromonks and the hierodeacons who were present. Fr. Leonid was buried near the main church of the Entrance of the Theotokos, opposite the chapel of St. Nicholas.

== Glorification ==
Elder Leonid of Optina was glorified with all the Elders of Optina by the Russian Orthodox Church Outside Russia in 1990. The feast day for St. Leonid of Optina is October 11.

The local veneration of the Elders of Optina was authorized by the Patriarchate of Moscow on June 13, 1996. Glorification of the Elders of Optina for universal veneration occurred on August 7, 2000.

== Sources ==
- Fr. Clement Sederholm, Elder Leonid of Optina, Platina, California, St. Herman of Alaska Brotherhood Press, 1990 ISBN 0-938635-50-6
- OCA: Venerable Leonid of Optina
- Hieroschemamonk Leonid

== See also ==
- Seraphim of Sarov
- Optina Monastery
- Ambrose of Optina
- Ignatius Bryanchaninov
