= Shamordino Convent =

Coordinates: 54°09′38″N 35°51′57″E

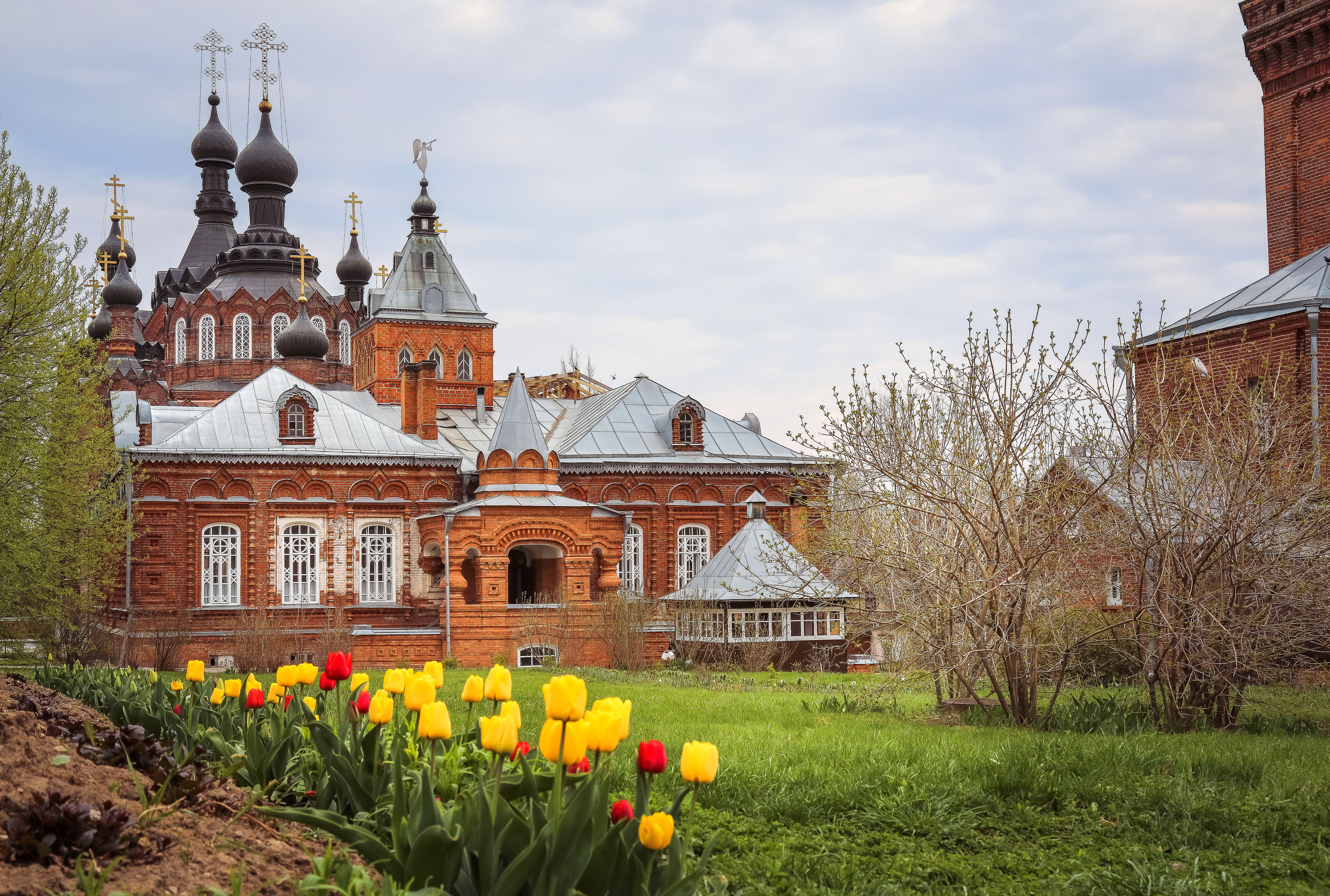
The convent grounds in the spring of 2018

The Convent of St. Ambrose and Our Lady of Kazan (Казанская Амвросиевская ставропигиальная женская пустынь) is a stauropegial Russian Orthodox convent in the village of Shamordino, Kaluga Oblast, Russia. It is located on the Seryona River, 12 km (7.5 mi) from Optina Monastery.

The convent was founded near the village of Shamordino in 1884 by Sofia Bolotova, a local noblewoman, with the blessing of Saint Ambrose of Optina. The monastery's churches were designed by Sergey Sherwood and Roman Klein in a peculiar brick version of the Russian Revival. By 1918, some 800 women lived in the convent and its sketes, making it one of the largest monastic establishments in Central Russia. In 1910, after leaving Yasnaya Polyana, Leo Tolstoy planned to go to Shamordino, where his sister Maria was living as a nun. The convent was shut down by the Soviets from 1923 until 1990.

== The Nuns of Shamordino, prisoners of Solovki and Vorkuta ==
The sisterhood of Shamordino Convent were imprisoned in 1923 at the closure of the convent by the Soviet authorities, first in Solovki prison camp, then the sisterhood was broken up and dispersed and, with the exception of one striking account by American prisoner John H. Noble that emerged following his release some 30 years after the nuns' disappearance, it is generally unknown, apart from scant references, what became of any other members of the sisterhood thereafter.

== Historical accounts ==
Account of I.M. Andreyevsky, Professor, Psychiatrist, Author, and Political Prisoner

The account in English of what was the immediate fate of the nuns was provided by I.M. Andreyevsky (Russian: Иван Михайлович Андреевский) in The Orthodox Word, a publication of monk Seraphim Rose and the Saint Herman of Alaska Monastery, which at the time of publication were under the Russian Orthodox Church Outside Russia. The following points highlight their imprisonment: Under orders from their spiritual father, also imprisoned at Solovki, they were not to do any work for the Soviet regime because the system was actively dismantling the Russian Orthodox Church. As a result of their steadfast adherence to the vow of obedience they had all taken upon their tonsure, they refused to do so much as a single stitch with a needle in service to the Soviets. They were threatened, beaten, tortured, starved, all to no avail. Finally, as a last resort, they were divided up and sent to various locations of forced labour and imprisonment throughout the Soviet Union in the hopes that total isolation would break their will and that they should submit to their captors. Other than these main details, little else was known of them until some 30 or 35 years later when an American prisoner was released and published his account (cited below) of his ten years of imprisonment in the Soviet Gulags.

Account of John H. Noble, American Political Prisoner

This account takes place at the arctic Vorkutlag prison camp nearing the end of the Stalin Era. The main points of John Noble's account are that they show that the wills of at least these three surviving nuns were unbroken, though they had by now been undergoing afflictions and punishments for some 25 years or so. They still refused to do any work whatsoever or under any circumstances. Moreover, they displayed astounding courage and strength: when subjected to torture, namely being placed in straitjackets that were extremely tight so as to cut off circulation, though writhing in agony they simply moaned quietly until they passed out. This was done repeatedly bringing them near to the point of death with no effect on breaking their will. After a respite, this torture was then increased in its torments by dousing the cotton jackets in water so that as it dried it tightened yet more. Again, racked with agony, yet to no avail. They endured all this without complaint or cursing their torturers but quietly and with a meek disposition. The camp commander, in a desperate bid to either get them to comply or die, then instructed them to be put outside in the snow on a hilltop in the winds of winter, and force them to stand there motionless for the full 8-hour workday and watch the other women prisoners work. Standing in prayer, they faithfully complied with this in the full sight of the other prisoners labouring in the fields. At the end of the day they returned, relaxed and warm, without any bodily damage. On the second day, the guards were ordered to put them out there again but stripped of hats and mittens. Though the workers were labouring and well-dressed they were complaining bitterly of the intense cold. The third day the same scene was repeated except that they had been divested of their scarves as well. On the fourth day, the guards were afraid and told the commandant that they refused to have any more to do with afflicting them. Even the commandant, being somewhat superstitious, was afraid at this point and relented. After that point, at least until John H. Noble's release, they were allowed to stay in a room by themselves, make habits for themselves, and were taken off punishment rations, being left in peace to observe their religious rule of prayer and communal life. This is the last that is known of what became of the Nuns of Shamordino.

== Veneration and canonical standing ==
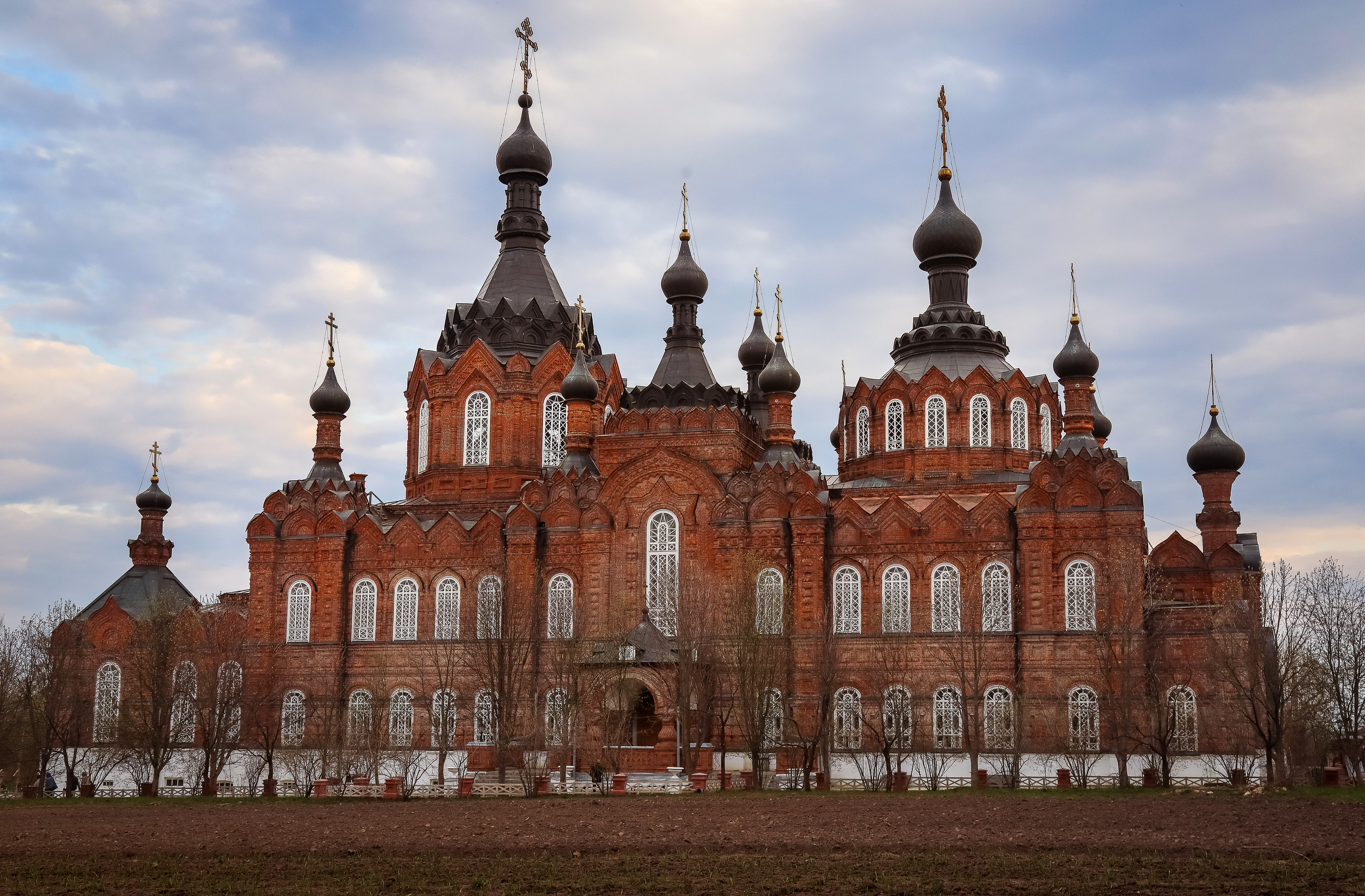
The katholikon is dedicated to the Theotokos of Kazan

While they have not been officially glorified (recognized as saints), they are commemorated on November 12 on the Julian Calendar by the Russian Orthodox Church Outside of Russia (ROCOR) which is in union with the Moscow Patriarchate. In the Eastern Orthodox Church there is no need for official declarations of sainthood as there is in Roman Catholicism where the process of canonization is different (see glorification). Many Eastern Orthodox saints have never been canonized in the official sense as practiced by the Vatican. Saint John Chrysostom is such an example where the Orthodox Church has never felt the need to issue an official document declaring him a "canonical saint" as such. Hence, here also, the veneration of many "unofficial" Orthodox confessors and martyrs who courageously refused to bend to the oppression of the Soviet State is exemplified and encouraged by the iconography that has arisen.
