= Ambrose of Optina =

Russian Orthodox elder, monk, and saint

Saint Ambrose of Optina
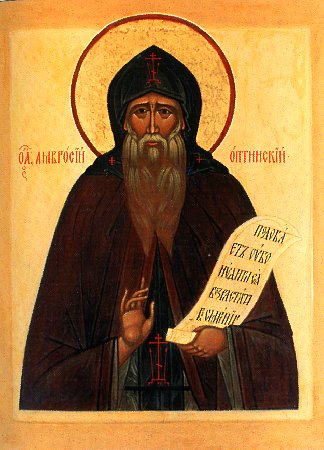
- Icon of St. Ambrose of Optina

Venerable Father
- Born: 5 December 1812; Bolshaya Lipovitsa settlement, Tambov, Russia
- Died: 23 October 1891; Shamordino
- Venerated in: Eastern Orthodox Church
- Canonized: 6 June 1988 and 13 May 1990, Trinity Lavra of St. Sergius and Montreal, Quebec by 1988 Local Council of the Russian Orthodox Church, (Patriarch Pimen I of Moscow) and Russian Orthodox Church Abroad
- Feast: 23 October [O.S. 10 October] (Repose); 10 July [O.S. 27 June] (Uncovering of Relics)
- Attributes: Clothed as a monk, sometimes holding a scroll

Ambrose of Optina (Russian: Амвросий Оптинский; birth name: Aleksander Mikhaylovich Grenkov, Russian: Александр Михайлович Гренков, December 5, 1812, Bolshaya Lipovitsa settlement, Tambov guberniya – October 23, 1891) was a starets and a hieroschemamonk in Optina Monastery, canonized in the 1988 convention of the Local Council of the Russian Orthodox Church.

== Biography ==
Aleksandr was born in the family of sexton Mikhail Fyodorovich Grenkov and Marfa Nikolayevna Grenkova. He was the sixth of eight children and his grandfather was the village priest. At the age of 12 Aleksandr entered the Tambov clerical school and later the Tambov theological seminary. In 1835, shortly before the graduation, Aleksandr became severely ill and made a vow if he got well to become a monk. He recovered but delayed his decision and became a private teacher in a family of a landlord and later in the Lipetsk clerical school. During summer vacation, Aleksandr met a well-known elder Hilarion from the village of Troekurovo. Hilarion advised: "Go to Optina and you will be experienced. You could go to Sarov too, but there are no more experienced elders there" (at that time, Seraphim of Sarov already reposed). Hilarion added: "They need you there". After this advice, in October 1839, Aleksandr entered the Optina Monastery in Kaluga guberniya. At this time the monastery was in its spiritual heyday. His first guide was Starets (Elder) Leonid and then later Starets Makary, whom Ambrose shared a cell with. This gave him get help in his spiritual progress.

Ambrose had a very lively humor and sociable character which conflicted with his more stoic spiritual discipline. Ambrose had many struggles with illness throughout his life building upon these struggles for insight into the human condition. Ambrose was tonsured as a monk, after only three years, in 1842; he was given the religious name Ambrose in honour of Ambrose of Milan. In another three years Ambrose advanced and was ordained a hieromonk (priest). On the trip to Kaluga for ordination, Ambrose caught cold. From that point forward, his health became so poor that he almost could not serve as a priest.

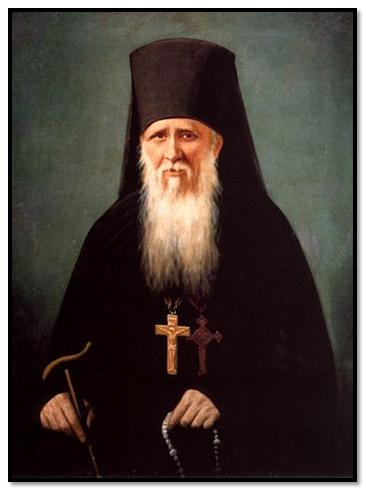
Portrait of Ambrose of Optina

Due to illness Ambrose was forced into semi-reclusion for several years. This seclusion allowed him to concentrate on the mastering of the Jesus Prayer or hesychasm and to experience the meaning of hesychia, the silence of the soul before God or theoria. Even though of a weak constitution Ambrose continued work assisting Makary with the translation of the Church Fathers, in particular, with the translation of The Ladder of Divine Ascent. Ambrose maintained his correspondence and counsel to pilgrims, and later as a staretz (Elder) out of love for all people he counseled and any who sought him. Ambrose served with Staret Macarius and spent much of his time translating holy books, including The Ladder of Divine Ascent by Abbot John of Sinai.

When Macarius died in September, 1860, Ambrose replaced him as the principal elder of the monastery. Ambrose remained the principal staretz of Optina for 30 years. Ambrose was visited by countless people, and his love for every person was so strong that he would even see people when he had passed the point of exhaustion being forced to lay down. Even then he would not refuse to listen to people coming to him to seek his counsel. The writers Leo Tolstoy and Fyodor Dostoevsky visited him at Optina.

The staretz had the gift of being able to see into people's souls where no secret was hidden from him. There is abundant testimony to his clairvoyance and gift of healing which he tried to conceal. Known for his deep kindness and compassion, no one's question or counsel was refused.

Being able to give wise advice to other people, Ambrose, due to his humility, sought advice from others without relying on his own mind even having the gift of reasoning. After the death of Macarius, having no one to turn to in his monastery, he turned first to his bishop Gregory. And over time, learning from some credible people about one hidden, wandering spiritual elder, Ambrose immediately tried to get close to him. He constantly wrote secret letters to this elder with the intention to do everything with the advice of another person in which he saw the expression of the will of God - not following one's own will.

Ambrose founded Shamordino Convent in 1884. This convent, which is near Optina, opened its doors to women who were poor, sickly, or even blind. Most convents were very poor and had to rely on the incomes of women who had a certain personal wealth in order to remain open. Ambrose made it possible for any woman who wished to become a nun. After the death of the first abbess, Mother Sophia, Ambrose went there in June 1890 to put the convent's affairs in order. He was unable to return to Optina due to illness, and died in the Shamordino cloister on October 10, 1891, and was buried in the Optina "desert" (poustin). His relics were placed in the Vvedensky Church of the Monastery; in 1998, they were moved to the church of the Vladimir Icon of the Mother of God.

== Cultural allusions ==
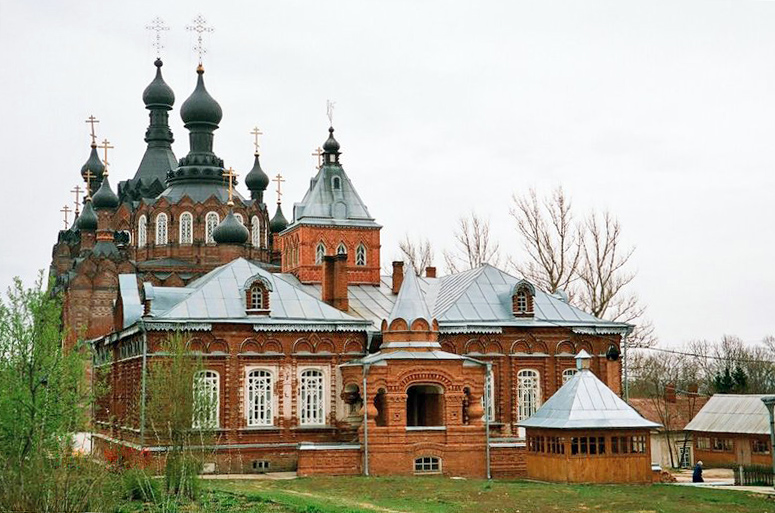
Shamordino Convent was founded by Ambrose

Elder Nektary of The Brothers Karamazov referred to Ambrose as "an earthly angel and a heavenly man." Ambrose is supposed to have been seen surrounded by the uncreated light more than once. In the Russian Orthodox tradition, this is the definitive sign of transfiguration and citizenship in the Kingdom of Heaven to come, or paradise, similar to what has been attributed to Seraphim of Sarov.

Ambrose was also a subject in Velikoe v malom i Antikhrist by Serge Nilus.

== Quotes ==
- "One should live without hypocrisy and behave in such a way as to set an example, then our actions will be right, otherwise they will turn out bad" (Russian: «Нужно жить нелицемерно и вести себя примерно, тогда дело наше будет верно, а иначе выйдет скверно»)
- "Live without cares, judge no-one, vex no-one, and honour everyone" («Жить - не тужить, никого не осуждать, никому не досаждать, и всем мое почтение»)
- "From kindness, people see things entirely differently."
- "Do not be greatly disturbed by the arrangement of your fate. Have only the unwavering desire for salvation and, standing before God, await His help until the time comes."
- "If we believe that we are saved by our own value, we have been deceived."

== Works ==
- Answer to those who are favorable to the Latin Church. Ответ благосклонным к Латинской Церкви (in Russian)
- Fear of God / Страх Божий. (in Russian)
- Отечник. Христианский брак

== See also ==
- Seraphim of Sarov
- Optina Monastery
- Kazan St Ambrose Convent
- Lev of Optina
