= Optina Monastery =

Eastern Orthodox monastery for men near Kozelsk in Russia

Coordinates: 54°03′12″N 35°49′57″E

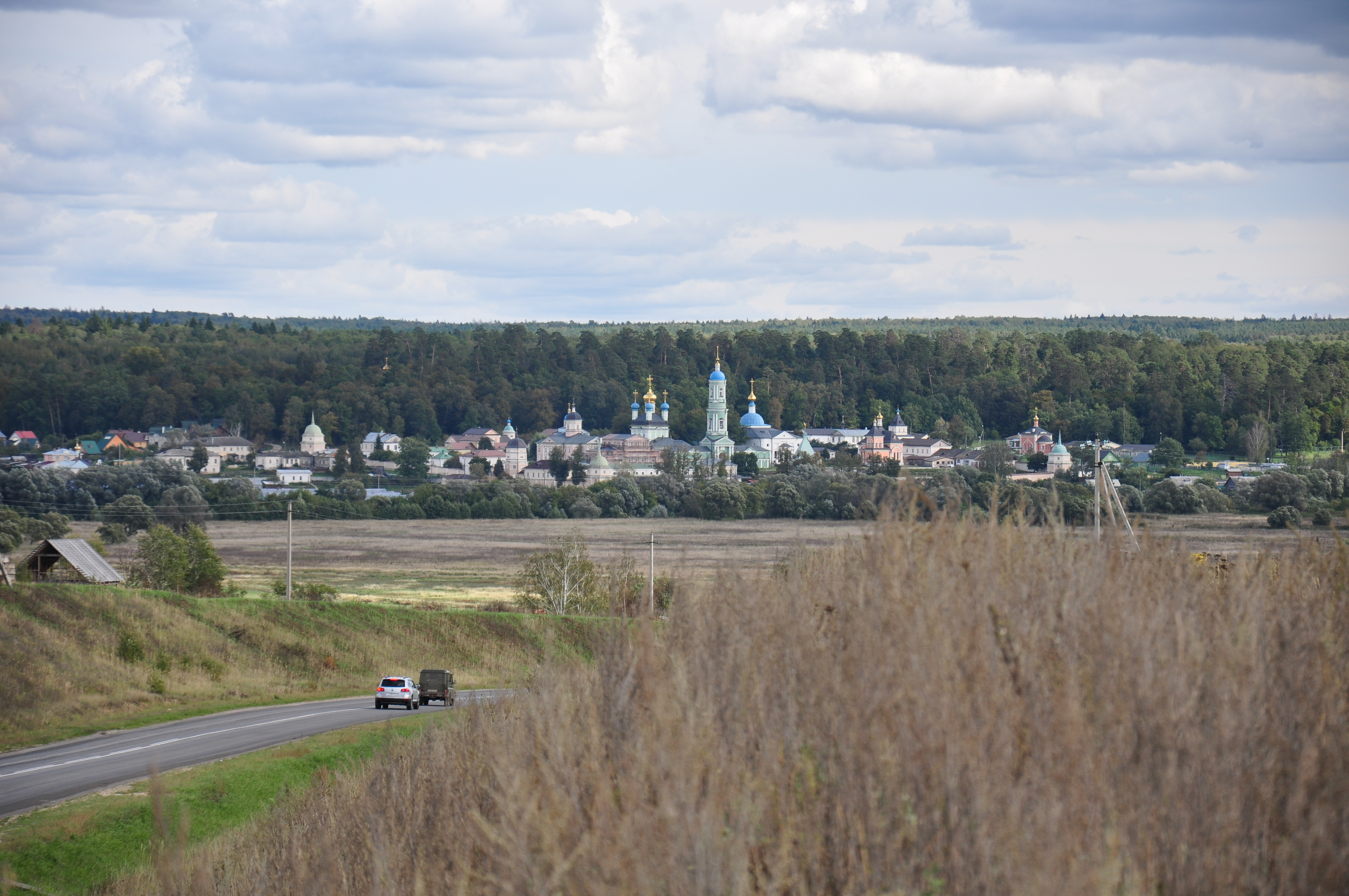
General view of the monastery

The Optina Pustyn (Russian: Óптина пýстынь, romanized: Óptina pústyn', literally Opta's hermitage) is an Eastern Orthodox monastery for men near Kozelsk in Russia. In the 19th century, the Optina was the most important spiritual centre of the Russian Orthodox Church and served as the model for several other monasteries, including the nearby Shamordino Convent. It was particularly renowned as the centre of Russian Orthodox eldership (staretsdom).

== History ==
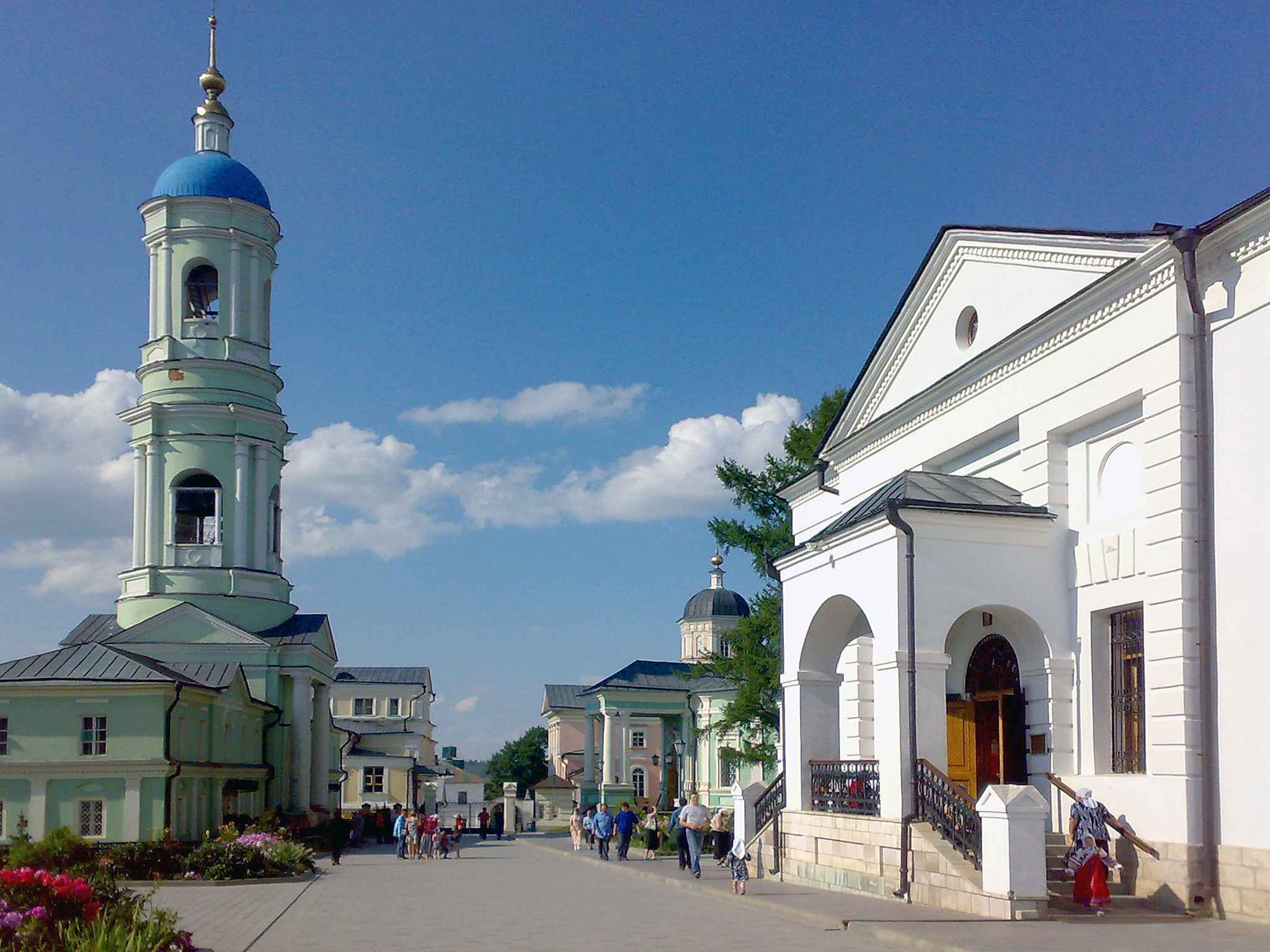
Inside the monastery.

It is not clear when the monastery was established. Its name is probably derived from the Russian word for "living together", possibly because nuns were allowed into the cloister prior to 1504.

Most of the monastery buildings were erected at the turn of the 18th and 19th centuries, when the monastery was being renovated as a centre of Russian staretsdom. In 1821, a hermitage for startsy was established 400 metres (1,300 ft) away from the monastery. The startsy attracted crowds of devout Christians to Kozelsk. Among others, Optina Pustyn was visited by Fyodor Dostoevsky, Vasily Zhukovsky, Nikolai Gogol, Ivan Turgenev, and Vasily Rozanov. Leo Tolstoy also visited the monastery, although he did not approve of the staretsdom.

The cloister boasted a rich library, collected with help from the Slavophile Kireyevsky brothers, both buried within the monastery walls. The philosopher Konstantin Leontyev lived at the monastery for four years and took the tonsure here. The local starets Saint Amvrosy is said to have been a prototype of Father Zosima in Dostoyevsky's novel The Brothers Karamazov.

After the Russian Revolution, the last of the startsy were forcibly deported from the monastery, which was declared a gulag. The last hegumen was executed in Tula in 1938. Later, some of the structures were demolished, while the cathedral was designated a literary museum. In 1939-1940 there was a camp for Polish Army officers - prisoners of war. Most of them were murdered by NKVD in the Katyń massacre.

In 1987 with the beginning of Perestroika, Optina Pustyn was one of the first abbeys to be returned to the Russian Orthodox Church. In the 1990s its most notable startsy were glorified as saints. They are commemorated together on October 10 (October 23 on the Gregorian Calendar).

In 1993 three inhabitants of the monastery were murdered on Easter night. They were hieromonk Basil (Roslyakov), monk Ferapont (Pushkaryov) and monk Trophim (Tatarinov), known collectively as the Optina martyrs.

== Startsy ==
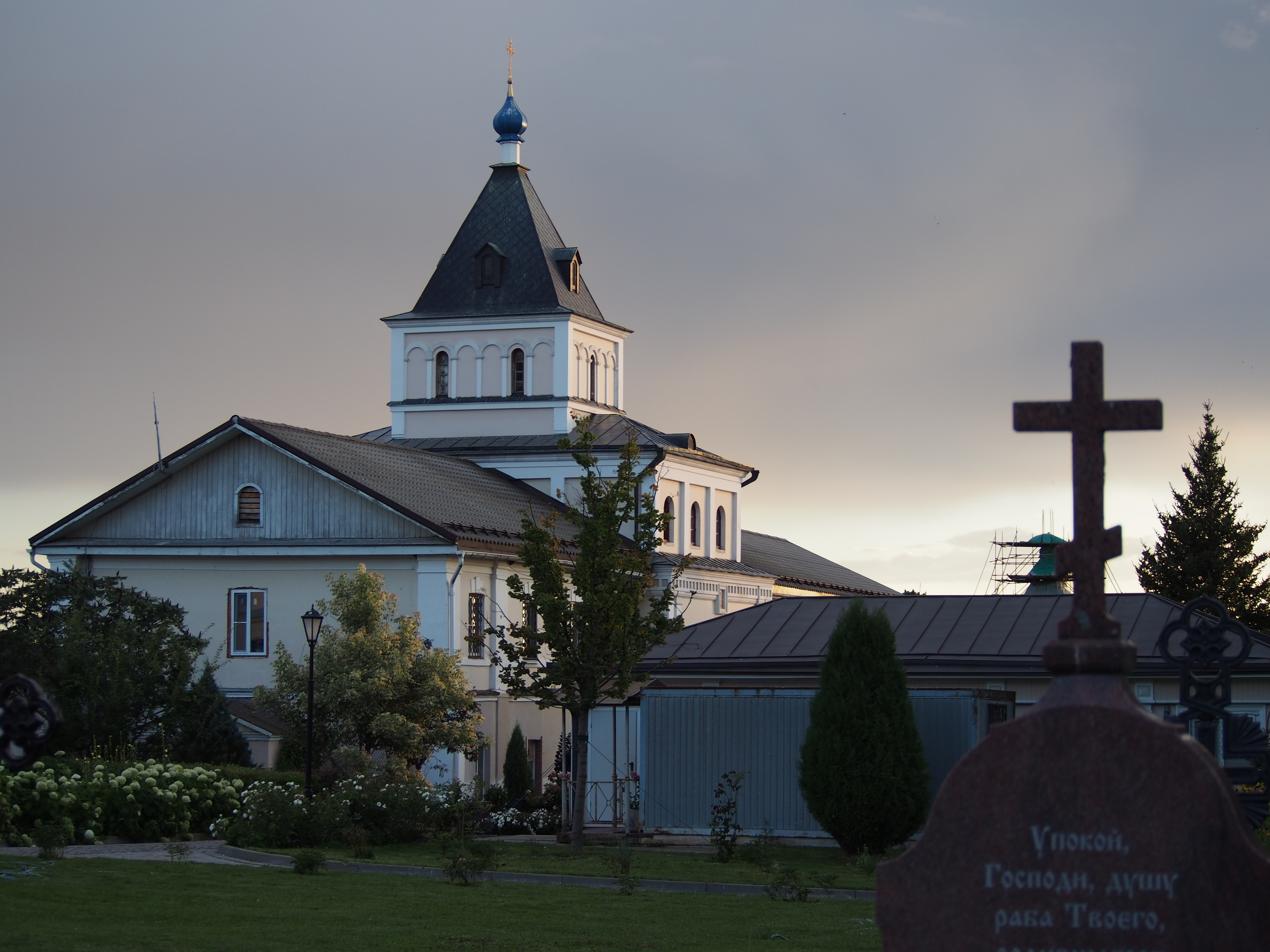
The Holy gate

The holy Fathers made the Optina Hermitage (or Poustinia) a focus for the powerful renewal movement that spread through the Church in Russia beginning early in the nineteenth century, and continuing up to (and even into) the atheist persecutions of the twentieth century. Saint Paisius Velichkovsky (November 15) was powerfully influential in bringing the almost-lost hesychastic tradition of Orthodox spirituality to Russia in the eighteenth century, and his labors found in Optina Monastery a 'headquarters' from which they spread throughout the Russian land. The Optina Elders were spiritual masters who became renowned throughout the Orthodox world for their holiness and spiritual gifts. Among them the most known are: Schema-Archimandrite Moses, Schema-Hegumen Anthony, Hieroschemamonk Leonid, Hieroschemamonk Macarius, Hieroschemamonk Hilarion, Hieroschemamonk Ambrose, Hieroschemamonk Anatole (Zertsalov) and Hieroschemamonk Barsanuphius.
