= Nikolai Rakov =

Russian composer

- Николай Раков
- Born: 14 March 1908; Kaluga, Kaluzhsky Uyezd, Kaluga Governorate, Russian Empire
- Died: 3 November 1990 (aged 82); Moscow, Russian SFSR, Soviet Union
- Education: Rubinstein Music School; Moscow Conservatory
- Occupations: Violinist; composer; conductor; academic
- Organizations: Moscow Conservatory
- Awards: Stalin Prize; People's Artist of the USSR

Nikolai Petrovich Rakov (Russian: Николай Петрович Раков; 14 March [O.S. 1 March] 1908 – 3 November 1990) was a Soviet violinist, composer, conductor, and academic at the Moscow Conservatory where he had studied. He composed mostly instrumental works, for orchestra, chamber music and piano music, especially pedagogic works. In 1946, he received the Stalin Prize for his first violin concerto, which became known internationally.

== Life ==
Born in Kaluga, Rakov first studied violin at the Rubinstein Music School in his hometown, and later composition at the Moscow Conservatory with Reinhold Glière and Sergei Vasilenko. After graduating in 1931, he served as Glière's assistant at the Conservatory in the following year, before becoming a lecturer himself in 1935 and professor of orchestration in 1943. Rakov's pupils included Edison Denisov, Boris Tchaikovsky, Nikolai Peiko, Andrei Eshpai, and Alfred Schnittke. In addition, he also gave concerts, as a violinist and as a conductor, and wrote several books on problems in orchestration. He received the Stalin Prize in 1946 for his Violin Concerto No. 1 in E minor (1944) and was named a People's Artist of the USSR in 1975. He died in Moscow.

== Style ==
Rakov was a staunchly conservative composer who exercised a solid grasp of orchestration and melody; many of his works ventured only a little beyond the style of Alexander Glazunov and Reinhold Glière, though his expressive range is far greater than the latter. Unabashed tonality, late Romantic harmonies, and flowing tunes were the hallmarks of his work, in which the Russian national idiom always took prominence. In his later works, Rakov began to show some interest in Neoclassicism. Rakov devoted special attention to music for children and wrote numerous piano pieces for pedagogical purposes, as well as instructive chamber music.

His music has been described as "well constructed, thematically appealing", with "attention to detail. Its expressive range is broad and notable for a vein of romantic lyricism in numerous slow movements. He was also capable of adding an element of lightly etched irony in his shorter works, a quality not typically associated with Soviet composers".

== Works ==
Rakov's compositions are mostly instrumental. He composed music for orchestra, including four symphonies, a sinfonietta, suites (Mari Suite), a concert overture, four piano concertos with string orchestra, two violin concertos and a concertino, and a fantasy for clarinet.

His chamber music includes violin sonatas, oboe sonatas, clarinet sonatas, sonatinas for violin, clarinet and harp (all with piano), pieces for cello and piano, and quartets for four cellos. He composed lieder and romances for voice and piano.

He composed music for piano solo, sonatas, sonatinas, variations, preludes concert etudes and many smaller works. His pedagogic works for children include pieces in all keys.

=== Orchestral ===
- Symphony No. 1 in D (1940, rev. 1958)
- Symphony No. 2 in F "Youth Symphony" (1957)
- Symphony No. 3 in C "Little Symphony" for string orchestra (1962)
- Symphony No. 4 (1973)
- Sinfonietta in G minor for string orchestra (1958)
- Mari Suite (1931)
- Russian Overture (1947)
- Concert Suite (1949)
- Four piano concertos with string orchestra (1969, 1969, 1973, 1977)
  - Concerto No. 1 in G major (one movement)
  - Concerto No. 2 in C major (one novement)
  - Concerto No. 3 for 2 pianos in C major, Op. 26
  - Concerto No. 4 for 2 pianos
- Violin Concerto No. 1 in E minor (1944)
- Violin Concerto No. 2 in A minor (1954–63)
- Concertino in D minor for violin and string orchestra (1960)
- Concert Fantasy in G minor for clarinet and orchestra (1968)

=== Chamber ===
- Two violin sonatas (1951, 1974)
- Two sonatinas for violin and piano (1959)
- Three pieces for violin and piano (1943)
- Nine pieces for cello and piano (1959)
- Two quartets for four cellos (1984, 1986)
- Two oboe sonatas (1951, 1978)
- Two clarinet sonatas (1956, 1975)
- Sonatina for clarinet and piano (1963)
- Three Sonatinas for harp and piano (1965, 1970, 1971)
- Lieder and Romances

=== Piano solo ===
- Four piano sonatas (No. 1, 1959; No. 2, 1973)
- Sonatinas (No. 1 in E minor, 1954; No. 4 in C minor; No. 16 in C, 1980)
- Variations in B minor (1949)
- Five Préludes (1936)
- Watercolors, nine pieces (1945)
- 24 children's pieces in all keys (1961)
- 20 Concert Études (1929–74)
- The Legend

== Recordings ==
Several works by Rakov were recorded. The composer conducted his first symphony, and also his Violin Concerto No. 1 with Oleg Kagan as soloist, available on used LP sites. Conductors such as Gennady Rozhdestvensky and Neeme Järvi recorded orchestral works, with violin soloists in the first concerto including David Oistrakh and Andrew Hardy. David Frühwirth and Milana Chernyavska recorded his compositions for violin and piano.
