= Patriarch Pimen I of Moscow =

Russian bishop

His Holiness Pimen I
- Patriarch of Moscow and all the Rus'
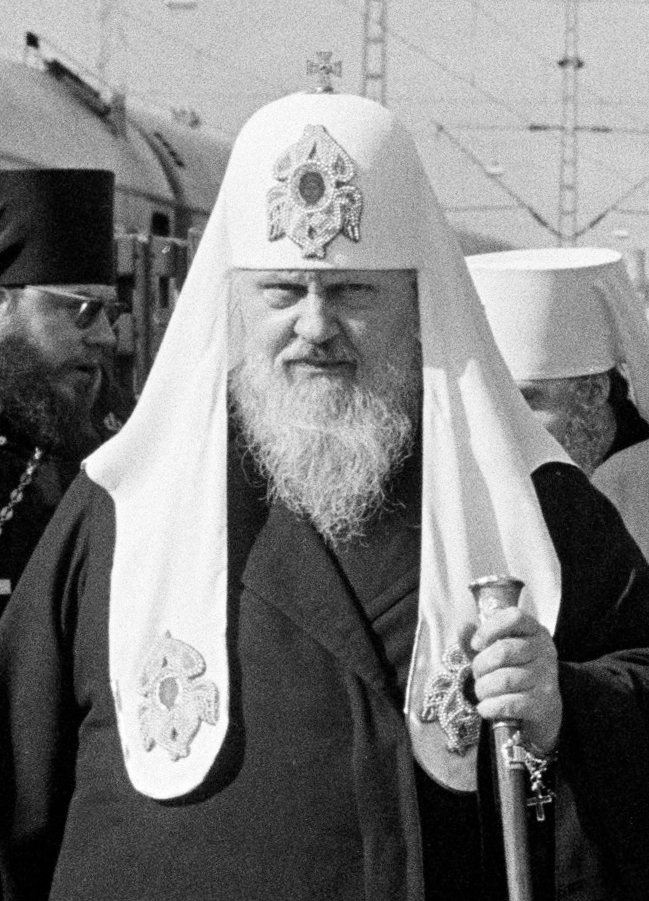
- Pimen in 1973
- Church: Russian Orthodox Church
- See: Moscow
- Installed: 3 June 1971
- Term ended: 3 May 1990
- Predecessor: Alexy I
- Successor: Alexy II

Orders
- Ordination: 25 January 1932
- Consecration: 17 November 1957 by Alexy I of Moscow

Personal details
- Born: Sergey Mikhailovich Izvekov; July 23, 1910 Kobylino village, Maloyaroslavetsky Uyezd, Kaluga Governorate, Russian Empire
- Died: May 3, 1990 (aged 79) Moscow, Russian SFSR, Soviet Union
- Buried: Trinity Lavra of St. Sergius
- Denomination: Eastern Orthodox Church
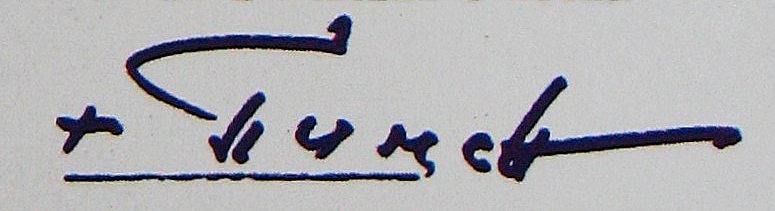
- Signature: Pimen I's signature

Patriarch Pimen I (Russian: Патриарх Пимен, born Sergey Mikhailovich Izvekov, (Note: In this name that follows East Slavic naming customs, the patronymic is Mikhailovich and the family name is Izvekov.) Сергей Михайлович Извеков; 23 July [O.S. 10 July] 1910 – 3 May 1990), was the 14th Patriarch of Moscow and the primate of the Russian Orthodox Church from 1971 to 1990.

== Biography ==
He was born to a pious family in 1910 in the village of Kobylino, Maloyaroslavetsky Uyezd, Kaluga Governorate (now Maloyaroslavetsky District, Kaluga Oblast). Soon the family moved to the Bogorodsk (now Noginsk, Moscow oblast).

On December 5, 1925, he tonsured a novice (similar to temporary vows) at Sretensky Monastery in Moscow. However, he stayed in this monastery for only about a month and left it due to the fact that the abbot of the monastery, Bishop Boris (Rukin), went into schism, retaining the monastery property for himself. On October 4, 1927, at the age of seventeen, he took eternal monastic vows with the name Pimen in honor of St. Poemen the Great in the Hermitage of the Holy Paraclete, a skete of the Trinity-Sergius Lavra. On July 16, 1930, he was ordained a hierodeacon by Archbishop Philip (Gumilevsky) of Zvenigorod, who then ruled the Moscow Diocese; on January 12, 1931, he was ordained a hieromonk at the Epiphany Cathedral in Dorogomilov.

In the summer of 1940, he entered the literature department of the Andijan Evening Pedagogical Institute (now Andijan State University). On October 25, 1940, he was appointed a teacher of Andijan School No. 1. By the beginning of World War II, he graduated from the first year of the Institute. On August 10, 1941, he was drafted into the Red Army.

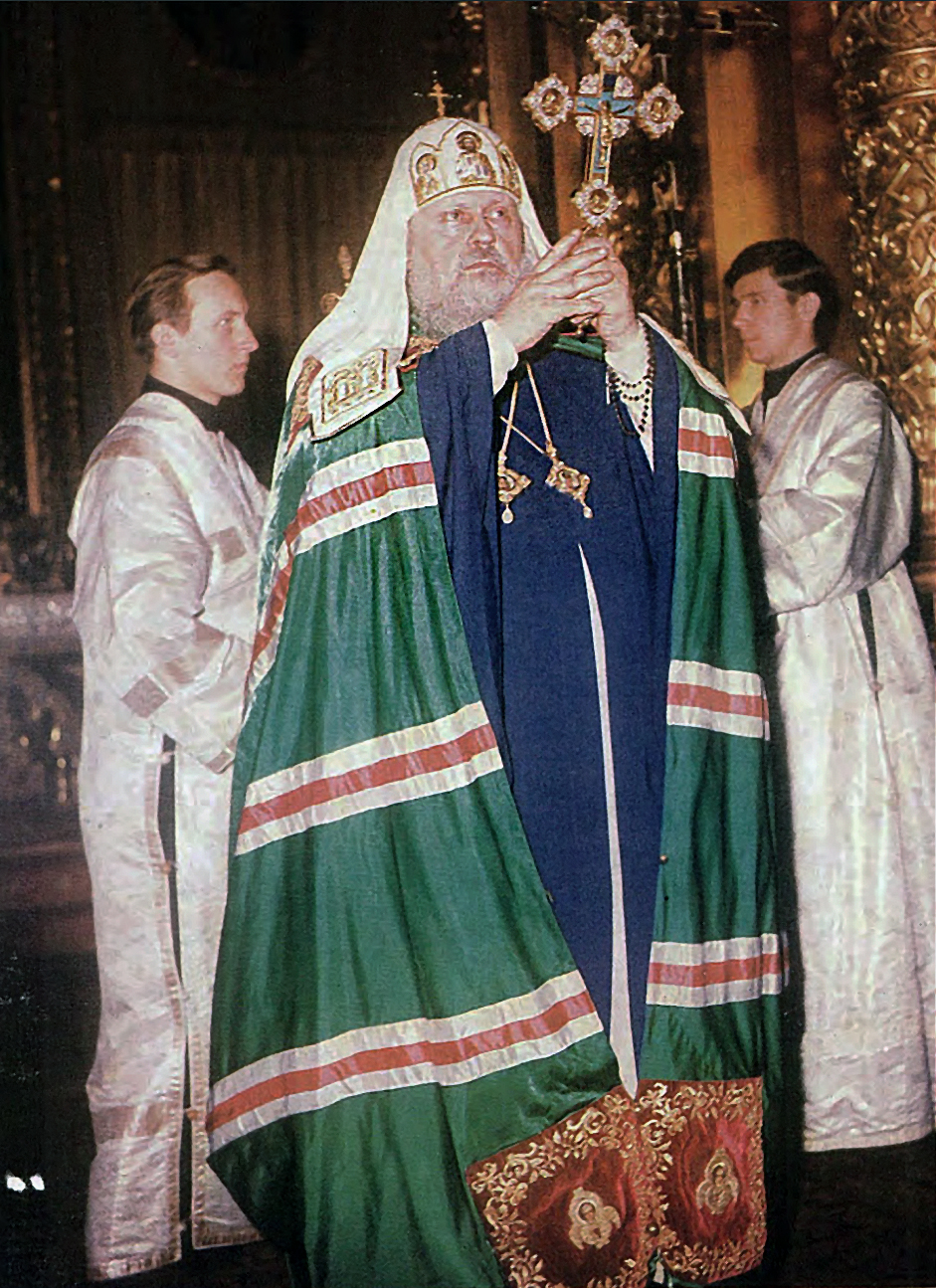
1976

From September 1945 to February 1946, he was treated at the Moscow Regional Tuberculosis Institute for spinal tuberculosis; on March 20, 1946, Bishop Onesimus (Festinatov) of Vladimir and Suzdal appointed him full-time priest of the Annunciation Cathedral of the former Annunciation Monastery in Murom.

In August 1946, he moved to Odessa, becoming first the rector of the bishop's church, and then the treasurer of the St. Eliah Monastery. In Odessa, he was under the command and patronage of Bishop Sergius (Larin), with whom he moved to Rostov-on-Don in 1947. At the beginning of 1947, for several months, at the request of Bishop Hieronymus (Zakharov) of Ryazan, he obeyed the sacristan of the Boris and Gleb Cathedral in Ryazan but was forced to leave due to dissatisfaction with his activities of local authorities.

On December 2, 1947, by the decree of Bishop Sergius, Hegumen Pimen was appointed secretary of the Rostov diocesan Administration; on March 9, 1948, he was appointed clerk of the Rostov Cathedral of the Mother of God-Nativity.

On August 12, 1949, he was appointed namestnik (alderman) of the Pskov-Caves Monastery; on April 13, 1950, he was elevated to the rank of Archimandrite by Metropolitan Gregory (Chukov) of Leningrad. In 1954 he was transferred to a similar position in Trinity Lavra of St. Sergius.

On November 17, 1957, in Odessa, he was consecrated bishop of Balta, vicar of the Diocese of Odessa.

Beginning December 26, 1957, he was bishop of Dmitrov, vicar of the Moscow diocese. From July 1960 to November 14, 1961, he was Chancellor of the Moscow Patriarchate.

On November 23, 1960, he was elevated to the rank of archbishop. On March 16, 1961, he became archbishop of Tula and Belyov.

On November 14, 1961, he was appointed Metropolitan of Leningrad and Ladoga.

After the death of Patriarch Alexius I in 1970, Metropolitan Pimen was chosen Patriarchal Locum Tenens, essentially a temporary replacement. Because 1970 was the centennial of Lenin's birth, Soviet authorities did not want a church council to select a new Patriarch during that year.

A Local Council was opened May 30, 1971. On June 2, 1971, the final day of the Council, Metropolitan Pimen was elected Patriarch of Moscow and All Russia. He was enthroned on June 3 of that year. (The other important act of the Council was the abolition of the "oath" on the old rites from the Great Moscow Synod of 1667.)

Pimen's task was to lead a Christian church in a state ruled by an officially atheist Communist party. In his post, he worked closely with the Communist authorities, participating in numerous "peace movement" conferences sponsored by the government. Pimen was awarded the Soviet Peace Fund Medal (1969, 1971) and, in 1970, the Gold Medal "Борцу за мир" ("Fighter for Peace") by the 'Soviet Committee for the Defence of Peace'. Pimen was a member of the World Peace Council from 1963 onwards. In 1961, Pimen was awarded the Order of the Red Banner of Labour (орден Трудового Красного Знамени), one of the highest awards of the time.

Near the end of his difficult term as head of the Russian Orthodox Church, he organized the celebration of the 1000th anniversary of the Christianization of Rus' in 1988. This event coincided with political reforms that ended much of the Communist party's anti-religious activity, and the church celebration was seen as marking the end of the persecution of Orthodox Christianity in the Soviet Union.

At that time he was seriously ill. When Patriarch Pimen died in 1990, the government made no effort to influence the choice of his successor.

== Notes ==
Eastern Orthodox Church titles
Preceded by Alexy I	Patriarch of Moscow; 1971–1990	Succeeded by Alexy II
