= Vladimir Orlov (politician) =

Soviet politician

- Владимир Орлов

Chairman of the Presidium of the Supreme Soviet of the Russian SFSR
- In office 26 March 1985 – 3 October 1988
- Premier: Vitaly Vorotnikov
- Preceded by: Mikhail Yasnov
- Succeeded by: Vitaly Vorotnikov

First Deputy Chairman of the Council of Ministers of the Russian SFSR
- In office April 1979 – March 1985

Personal details
- Born: 16 August 1921 Kotovo, Mosalsky Uyezd, Kaluga Governorate, RSFSR
- Died: 4 April 1999 (aged 77) Moscow, Russia
- Party: Communist Party of the Soviet Union

Vladimir Pavlovich Orlov (Russian: Владимир Павлович Орлов; 16 August 1921 – 4 April 1999) was a Soviet politician, who was the Chairman of the Presidium of the Supreme Soviet of the Russian SFSR from 1985 until 1988.
