= Georgy Morozov =

Soviet army lieutenant (1923–1971)

Georgy Andrianovich Morozov
- Георгий Андрианович Морозов
- Born: April 24, 1923; Upryamovo, Meshchovsky Uyezd, Kaluga Governorate, Soviet Union
- Died: 29 April 1971; Elektrostal, Soviet Union
- Military career
- Branch: Soviet Airborne Forces
- Service years: 1941–1945
- Rank: Sergeant
- Units: 2nd Guards Airborne Regiment, 3rd Guards Airborne Division
- Conflicts: World War II
- Awards: Hero of the Soviet Union; Order of Lenin; Medal "For the Defence of Moscow"; Medal "For the Victory over Germany in the Great Patriotic War 1941–1945"; Jubilee Medal "Twenty Years of Victory in the Great Patriotic War 1941–1945"; Medal "In Commemoration of the 800th Anniversary of Moscow"; Jubilee Medal "50 Years of the Armed Forces of the USSR"

Georgy Andrianovich Morozov (Russian: Георгий Андрианович Морозов; 24 April 1923 – 29 April 1971) was a Red Army sergeant and a Hero of the Soviet Union. Morozov was awarded the title for reportedly killing 50 German soldiers during the Battle of the Dnieper and capturing a machine gun. Postwar, he was an overseer at an engineering plant in his home of Elektrostal.

== Early life ==
Morozov was born on 24 April 1923 in Uprayamovo village in Meshchovsky Uyezd of Kaluga Governorate to a peasant family. After finishing seven grades of school, he worked at an engineering plant in Elektrostal.

== World War II ==
Morozov was drafted into the Red Army in June 1941. In 1942, he joined the Communist Party of the Soviet Union. He fought in the Battle of Demyansk and the Staraya Russa operation in spring 1943. In July, he fought in the Battle of Kursk.

By October 1943, he was a sergeant in a reconnaissance platoon of the 2nd Guards Airborne Regiment of the 3rd Guards Airborne Division. He fought in the Battle of the Dnieper. On 2 October 1943, Morozov's unit was discovered by German troops during a reconnaissance mission in Stracholesje, Chernobyl Raion. Morozov reportedly killed 30 German soldiers. On the night of 8 October, he captured a German machine gun, reportedly killing 20 German soldiers despite being seriously wounded. On 10 January 1944, he was awarded the title Hero of the Soviet Union and the Order of Lenin.

Morozov continued to fight in combat with the 3rd Guards Airborne. In the fall, he fought in the Zhitomir–Berdichev Offensive. In spring 1944, he participated in the Uman–Botoșani Offensive. During the summer, Morozov fought in the Second Jassy–Kishinev Offensive. In November, the division fought in the Battle of Debrecen. It advanced into Hungary and participated in the Siege of Budapest. In spring 1945, the division repulsed Operation Spring Awakening and entered Austria, taking part in the Vienna Offensive.

== Postwar ==
Morozov was demobilized in 1945. He returned to Elektrostal, becoming an overseer of production in ELEMASH Machine-Building Plant. The plant manufactured equipment for nuclear reactors. Morozov died on 29 April 1971.
