= Illarion Pryanishnikov =

Russian painter

- Илларион Прянишников
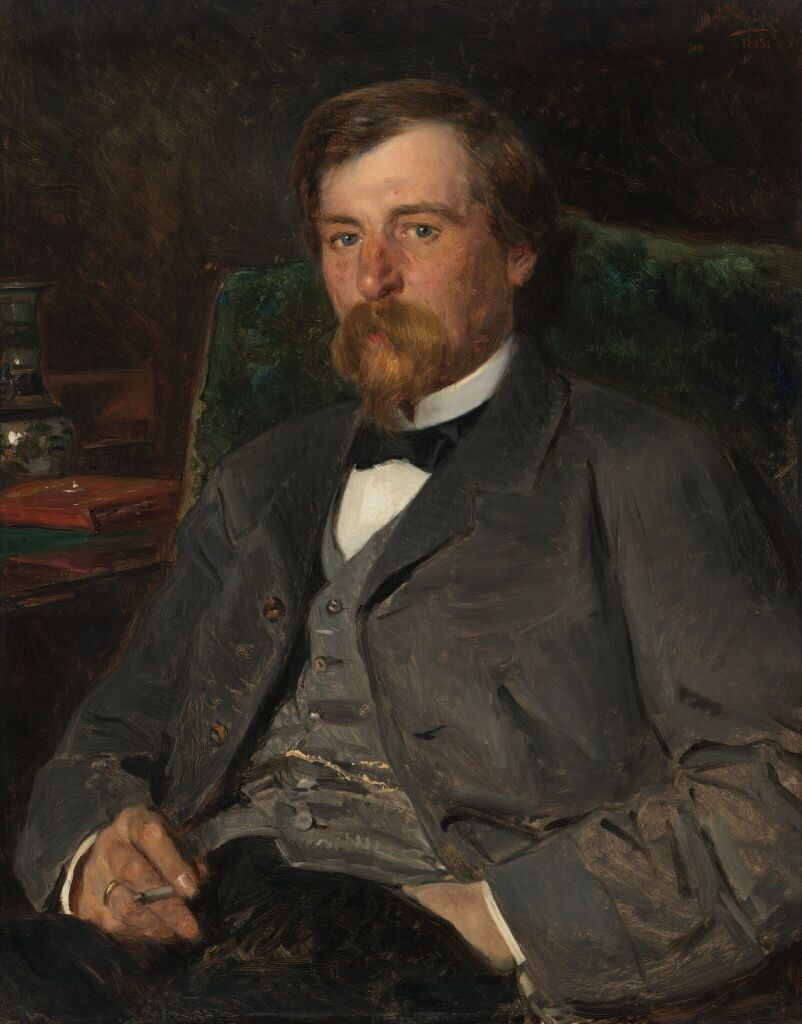
- Portrait by Vladimir Makovsky, 1883, oils; Tretyakov Gallery
- Born: March 20, 1840; Borovsky Uyezd, Kaluga Governorate, Russian Empire
- Died: March 24, 1894 (aged 54); Moscow, Russian Empire
- Education: Full Member Academy of Arts (1893)
- Alma mater: Moscow School of Painting
- Known for: Painting

Illarion Mikhailovich Pryanishnikov (Russian: Илларион Михайлович Прянишников; 20 March [O.S. 8 March] 1840 – 24 March [O.S. 12 March] 1894) was a Russian painter, one of the founders of the Peredvizhniki artistic cooperative, which broke away from the rigors of their time and became one of the most important Russian art schools of the late 19th century.

== Biography ==
Illarion Pryanishnikov was born in the village of Timashovo in the Borovsky Uyezd of Kaluga Governorate (today's Borovsky District of Kaluga Oblast) in a family of merchants. From 1856 to 1866 he studied in the Moscow School of Painting, Sculpture and Architecture in the classes of Evgraf Sorokin and Sergey Zaryanko.

His picture Jokers. Gostiny Dvor in Moscow, painted in the last year of education, straight away brought to him a wide reputation. In this small canvas he gives an original solution of a theme of the humiliation of human dignity, callousness and cruelty in the world, where everything is bought and is sold. After depicting the tipsy merchants, who with a jeer are compelled to dance under the concertina and a poor elderly official, the artist authentically demonstrates a whole gallery of the specimens of moral deformity and complacent caddishness. The painting caused indignation in some adherents of official academic art who felt that the young painter appeared as the destroyer of the "high" destination of the art which was to express in the ideal form the eternal truths.

In 1870 Pryanishnikov received the title of the "painter of 1st degree". From 1873 until his death he was a teacher in the MSoPSA and his apprentices were Konstantin Korovin, Vitold Byalynitsky-Birulya, Mikhail Nesterov, Alexei Stepanov and others.

From the outset of the existence of the union of Peredvizhniks, he was a member, and from the second exhibition he was one of directors of the union. Although Pryanishnikov lived in mainly in Moscow, he often visited the Russian north where he sketched. He took part in the decoration of the original Cathedral of Christ the Saviour, which was demolished in 1931.

Pryanishnikov died in Moscow in 1894.

== Gallery ==
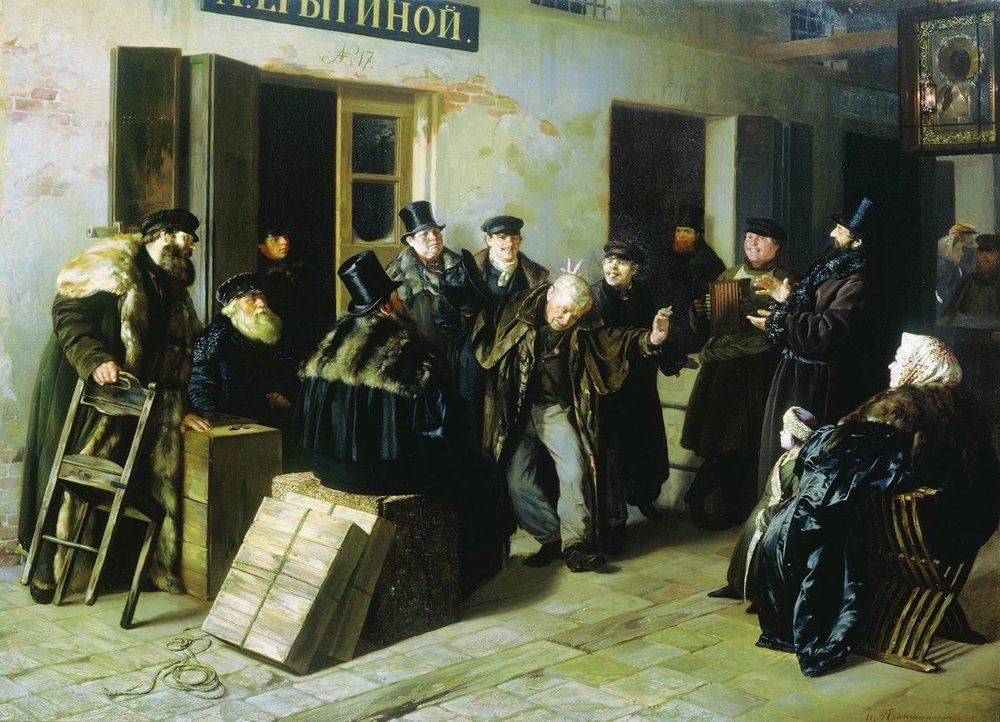
Jokers. Gostiny Dvor in Moscow (1865)

Empties (Порожняки, 1872)

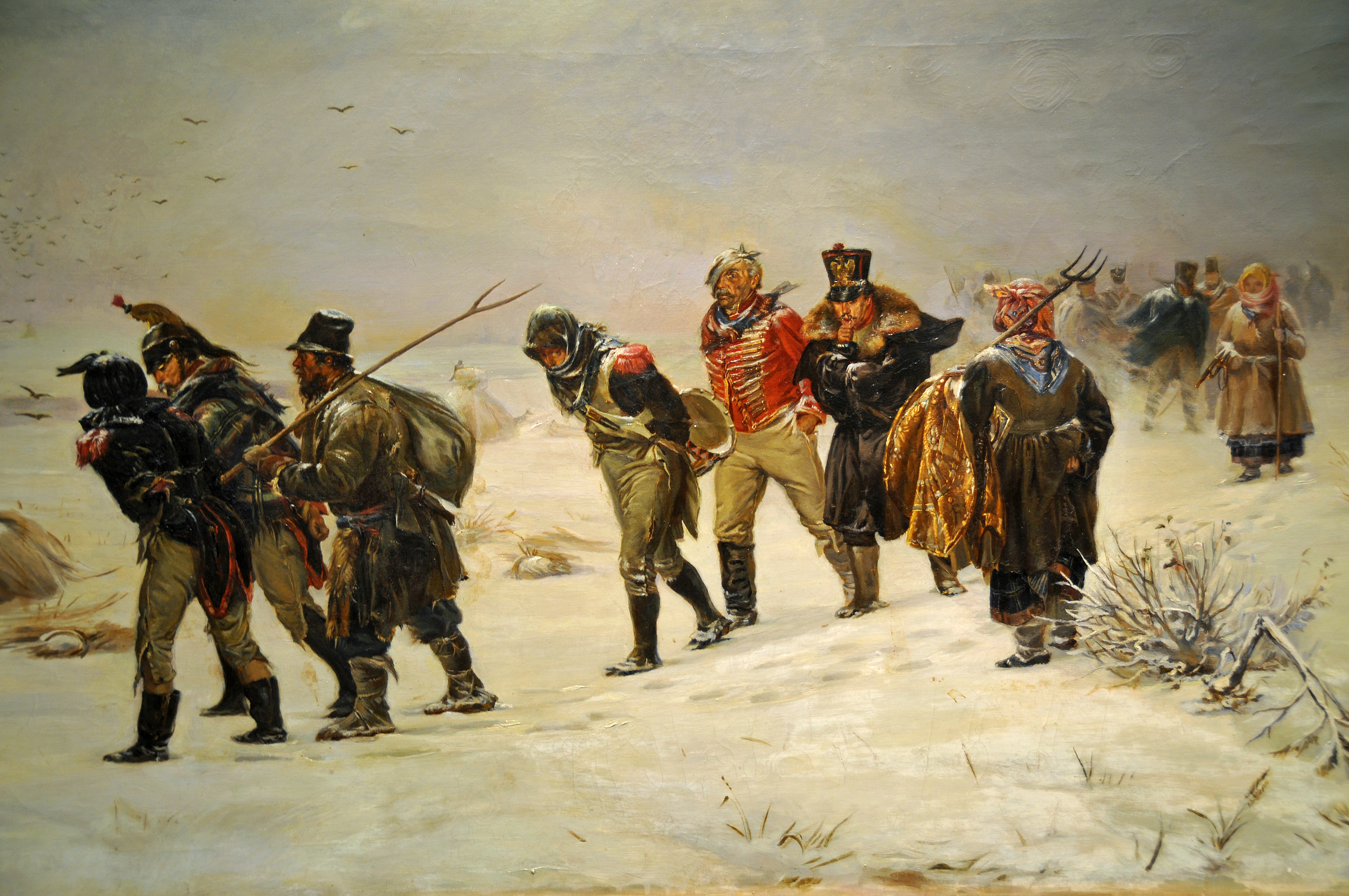
French retreat from Russia in 1812 (1874)

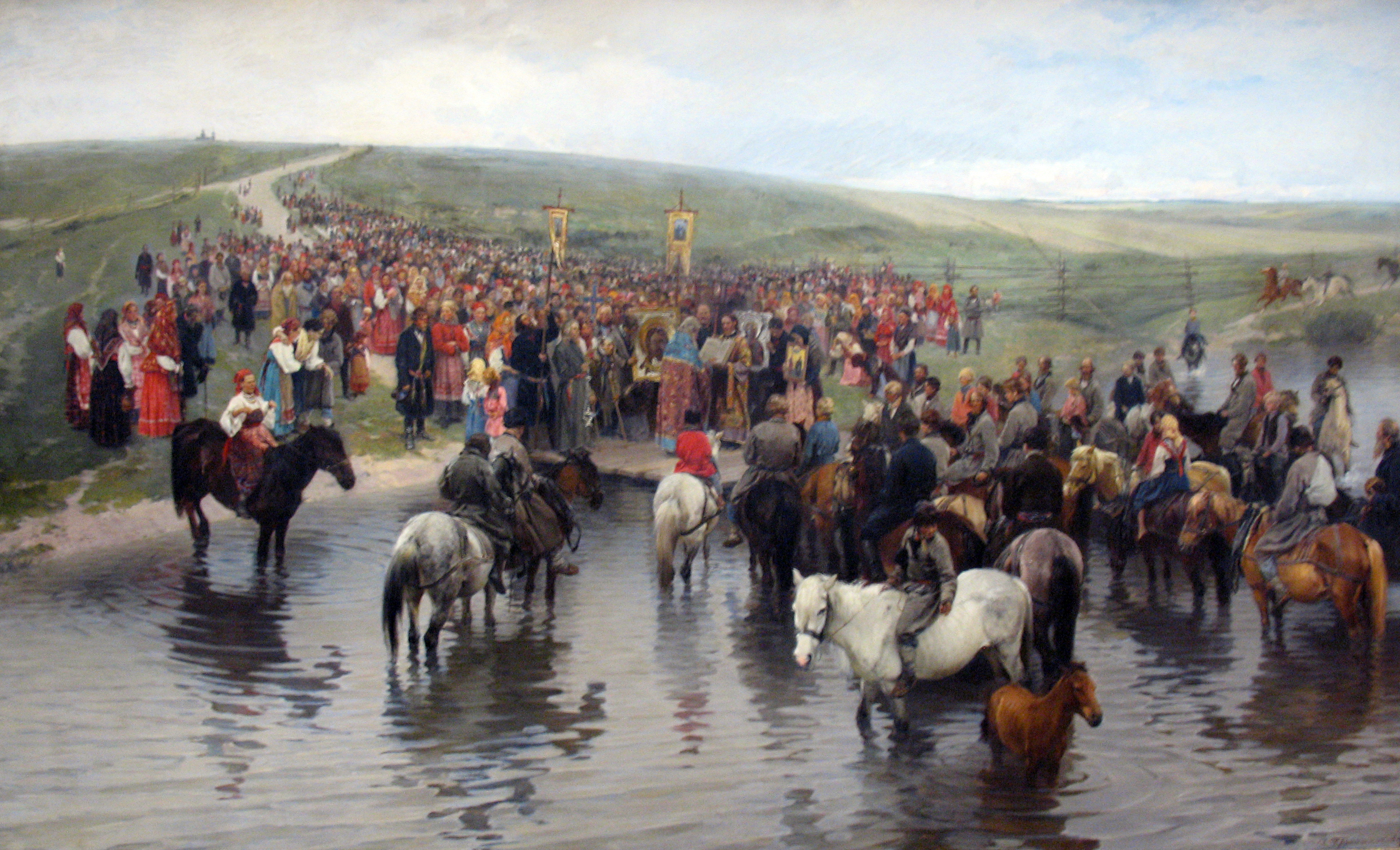
Resurrection day in the north (1887)

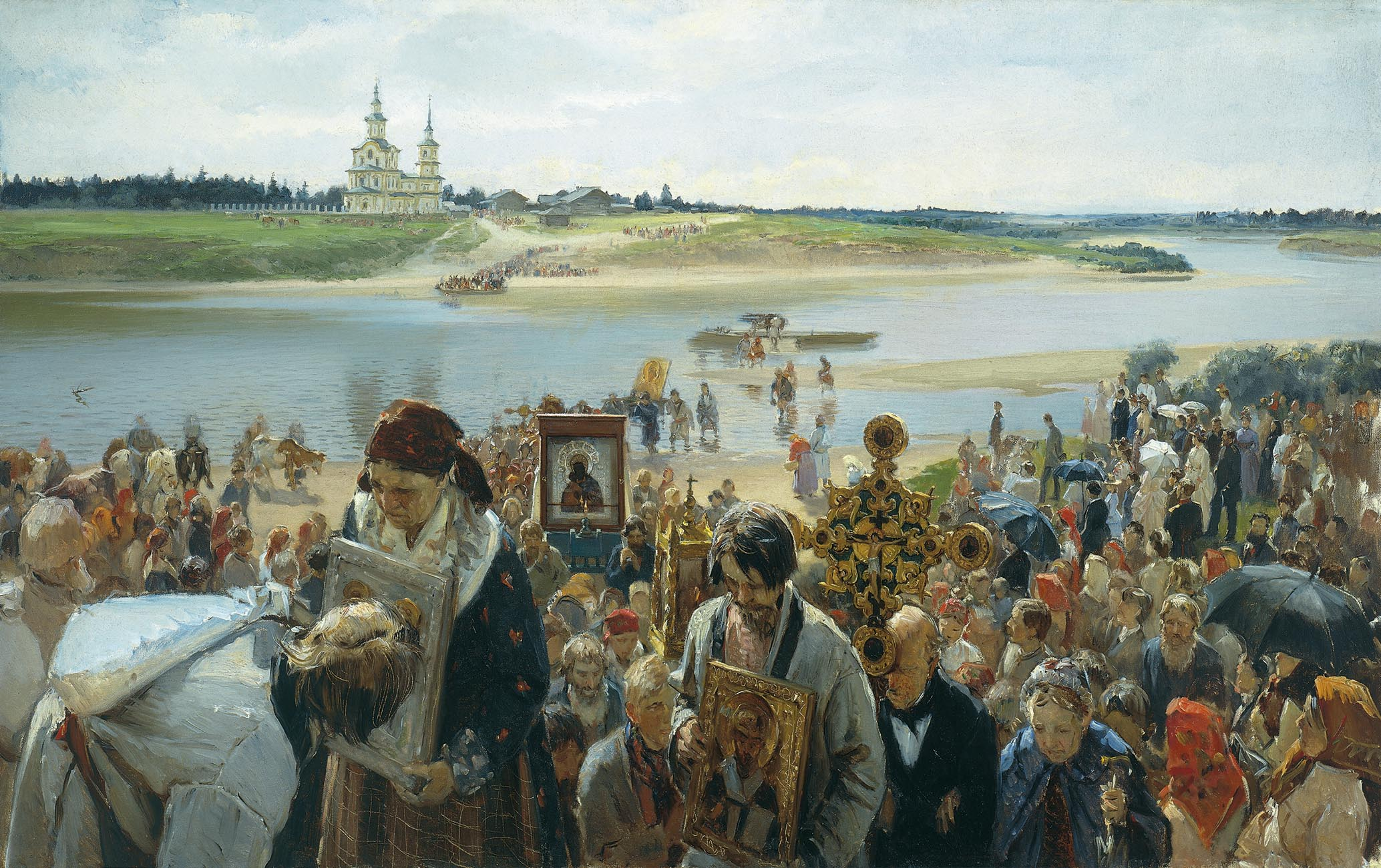
Easter procession (1893)

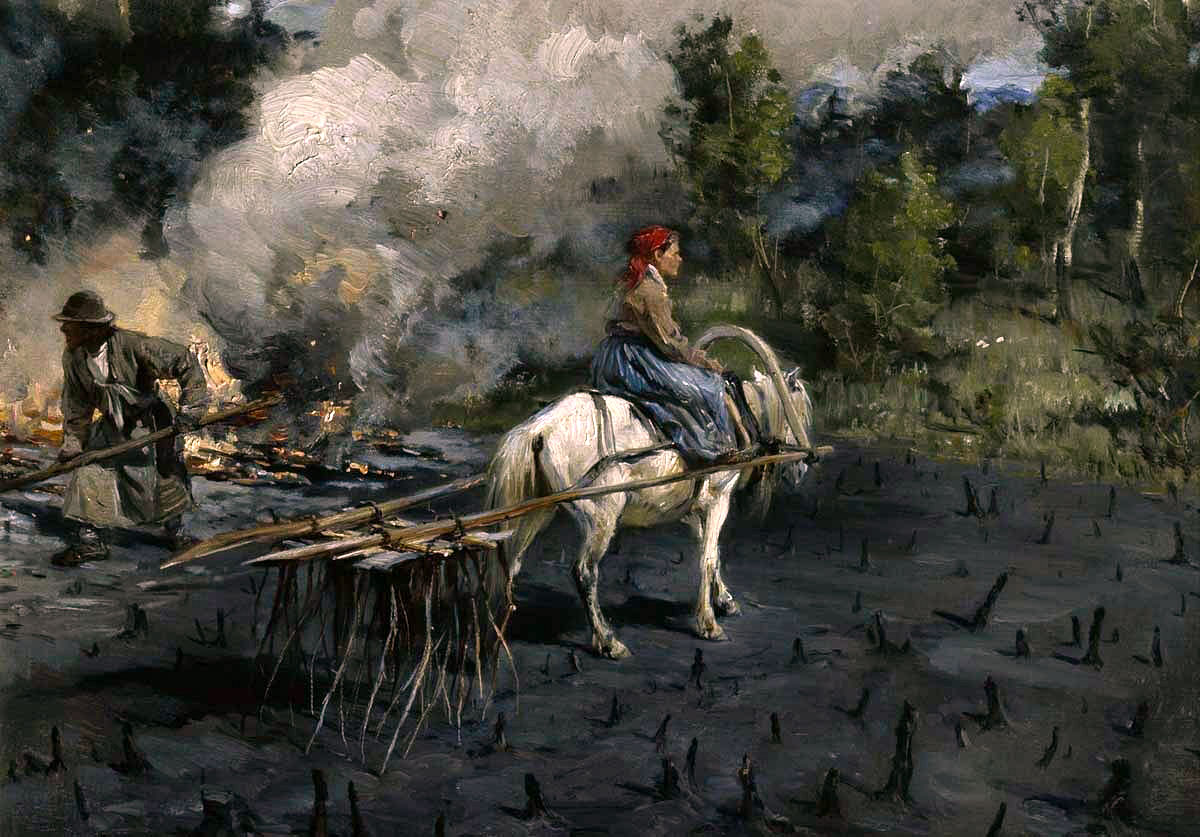
Preparing the Ground for Flax (1890)
