= Sergey Arzhanukhin =

Russian philosopher

Sergey V. Arzhanukhin
- Born: September 1, 1957 (age 68)

Sergey V. Arzhanukhin (Russian: Сергей Владимирович Аржанухин) is a Russian philosopher. He is a professor at the Russian Presidential Academy of National Economy and Public Administration and holds a Doctor of Philosophical Sciences. Arzhanukhin is knowledgeable in philosophy and public and political theories of Russian masons.

== Early life and education ==
Sergey V. Arzhanukhin was born September 1, 1957. In 1980 he graduated the Philosophy Faculty, the Ural Federal University and 1984 completed the post-graduate course at the Saint-Petersburg State University; the highest academic degree, Doctor of Philosophical Sciences, was successfully defended in 1996 at the Ural Federal University.

== Work ==
His monograph "Philosophical Views of the Russian Masons", based on a thorough and comprehensive evaluation of archive printed works and manuscripts, was published in 1995. This essay became the first monograph published on the "post-soviet" territory after G.V. Vernadsky's dissertation "Russian Masons during Catherine II Queenship" (Petrograd, 1917). The monograph preserved and developed the tradition to provide a complex investigation of Russian Masons' views covering works by M.N. Longinov, A.N. Pypin, S.V. Eshevsky, P.P. Pekarsky, N.S. Tikhonravov, V.O. Kluchevsky, T.O. Sokolovskaya and others.

The monograph became the academic novelty due to the fact that here one can find the bibliography classification concerning the history of philosophical and political views of Freemasons. There is a description of a historical environment which inspired the development of Masonry's values, the latter demonstrating that the Russian Freemasonry can be viewed as a national phenomenon in the history of the Russian philosophy. A whole range of theoretical sources created by the Russian Masonry has been for the first time ever introduced to the academic public. Metaphysic background in moral philosophy is outlined; Russian masons' religious and philosophical ideas and notions defining man's attitude to the world and to the society are specified. Such philosophical notions as free will and attitude to good and evil are discussed.

Contemporary social and historical changes occurring in Russia inspired the researcher to turn to post industrial issues, such as knowledge management, development of academic capitalism, happiness economics.

== Selected publications ==
- (in Russian) Шварц И. Г. «Отрывки из лекций покойного профессора И. Г. Шварца» [биографический очерк, подготовка текста и примечания] // Русская философия второй половины XVIII в.: Хрестоматия. Свердловск: Урал. ун-т, 1990.
- (in Russian) Образ человека по уставу вольных каменщиков // Философские науки. 1991. No. 11.
- (in Russian) Из лекций И. Г. Шварца «О трех познаниях: любопытном, полезном и приятном». Отрывки из философских бесед покойного профессора И. Г. Шварца [предисловие, подготовка к публикации и примечания] (публикация из серии философское наследие) // Философские науки, No. 1, 1992.
- (in Russian) Очерки русской философии XVIII — ХХ вв. Екатеринбург, 1994. В соавт.
- (in Russian) Философские взгляды русского масонства: По материалам журнала «Магазин свободнокаменщический». Екатеринбург: Урал. ун-т, 1995. [электронный ресурс]. URL: http://aiem-asem.org/wp-content/uploads/2015/01/arzhanukhin_sv_filosofskie_vzgljady_russkogo_mason.pdf
- (in Russian) Очерки истории и теории русского масонства / /Разум власти прирастает наукой: Интеллектуальный портрет ведущих ученых Уральской академии государственной службы. Екатеринбург: УрАГС, 2001.
- (in Russian) Масонство // Философский энциклопедический словарь. Москва: МГУ, 2001.
- (in Russian) Масонство (история, миссия, организационное строение, цели и задачи организации) // Мегаэнциклопедия Кирилла и Мефодия [электронный ресурс]. URL: https://megabook.ru/article/Масонство
- (in Russian) Мормоны (периодизация, миссия, организационное строение, экзегетика) // Мегаэнциклопедия Кирилла и Мефодия [электронный ресурс]. URL: https://megabook.ru/article/Мормоны
- (in Russian) Шварц Иван Григорьевич (основные биографические вехи, наследие) // Мегаэнциклопедия Кирилла и Мефодия [электронный ресурс]. URL: http://megabook.ru/article/Шварц%5B%5D Иван Григорьевич
- (in Russian) Менеджмент знаний: классический идеал рациональности управленческого поведения // 2012 год, выпуск 19
- (in Russian) Организационные патологии управления кадровым резервом на государственной гражданской службе // Вопросы управления. Выпуск 18, 2012. В соавт.
- (in Russian) Гедонистическая модель высшего профессионального образования в постиндустриальном обществе: к постановке проблемы модернизации образования // Вестник государственного университета управления. Выпуск No.15 октябрь 2013. http://vestnik.guu.ru/wp-content/uploads/2015/02/15-an.doc
- (in Russian) Индексы счастья в муниципальном управлении: постиндустриальный аспект // ( Вопросы управления. 2014 год, выпуск 29
- (in Russian) Социальные технологии государственного управления институтом семьи в постиндустриальном обществе // Институты развития демографической системы общества : V Уральский демографический форум : сборник материалов. — Екатеринбург: Институт экономики УрО РАН, 2014. [электронный ресурс]. URL: https://elar.urfu.ru/handle/10995/30105
