= Tikhonravov =

Tikhonravov is an artificial Russian surname originated in clergy, derived from the words "tikho-" ('quiet') +"-nrav" ('nature') and given to a clerical student as an epithet for his calm nature. The feminine form is Tikhonravova. People with this name include:

- Konstantin Tikhonravov (born 1857), Russian general
- Mikhail Tikhonravov (1900–1974), Soviet aerospace engineer and scientist
- Nikolai Tikhonravov (1832–1893), Russian philologist and historian of Russian literature

== See also ==
- Tikhonravov (crater), large, eroded crater in the Arabia quadrangle of Mars
