= Kozelsky Uyezd =

Kozelsky Uyezd (Козе́льский уе́зд) was one of the subdivisions of the Kaluga Governorate of the Russian Empire. It was situated in the southern part of the governorate. Its administrative centre was Kozelsk.

== Demographics ==
At the time of the Russian Empire Census of 1897, Kozelsky Uyezd had a population of 124,436. Of these, 99.8% spoke Russian as their native language.
