= Ekaterina Junge =

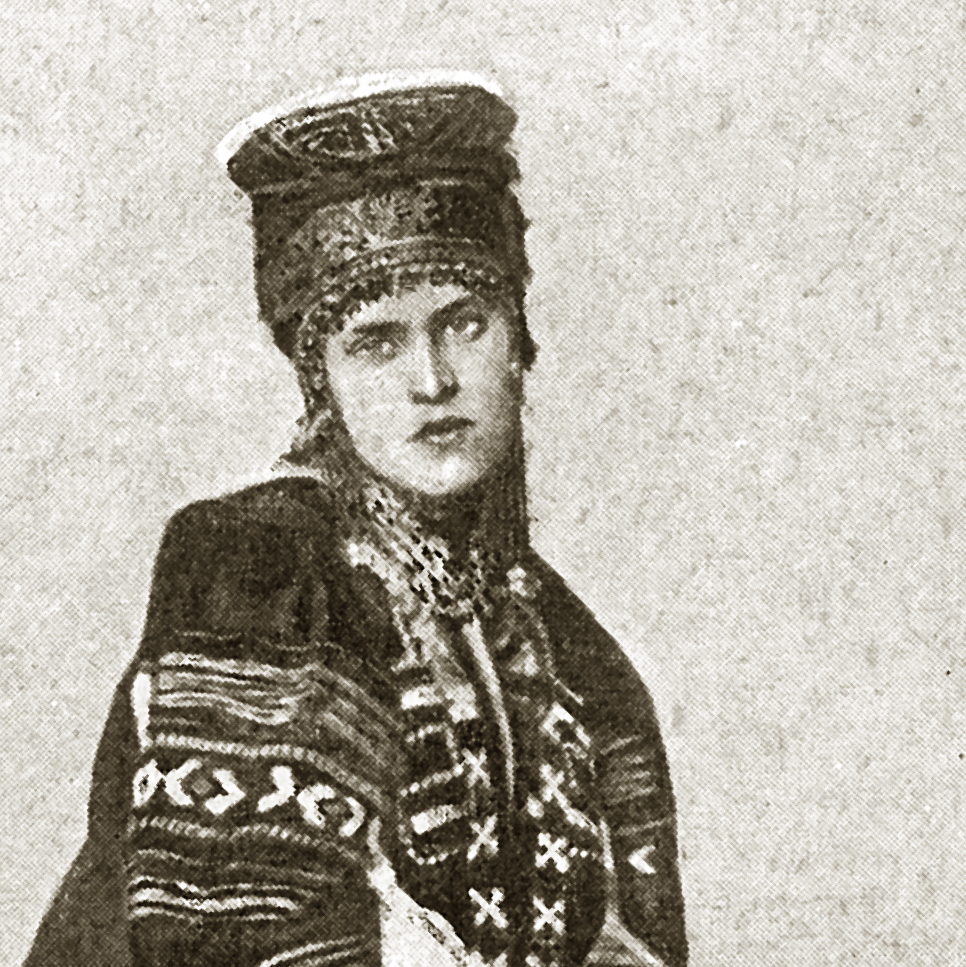
- Born: Countess Ekaterina Fyodorovna Tolstaya; November 24, 1843; Saint Petersburg
- Died: January 20, 1913 (aged 69); Moscow
- Buried: Donskoy Monastery, Moscow
- Noble family: House of Tolstoy
- Spouse: Eduard Junge (m. 1863; died 1898)
- Father: Count Fyodor Petrovich Tolstoy
- Occupation: painter

Countess Ekaterina Fyodorovna Tolstaya, married name Junge (Russian: Екатерина Фёдоровна Юнге; 24 November 1843 – 20 January 1913) was a Russian painter from the Tolstoy family.

== Biography ==
Junge was born in Saint Petersburg in 1843 to Count Fyodor Petrovich Tolstoy. She was the second cousin to Leo Tolstoy. Her father was Vice-President of the Imperial Academy of Arts.

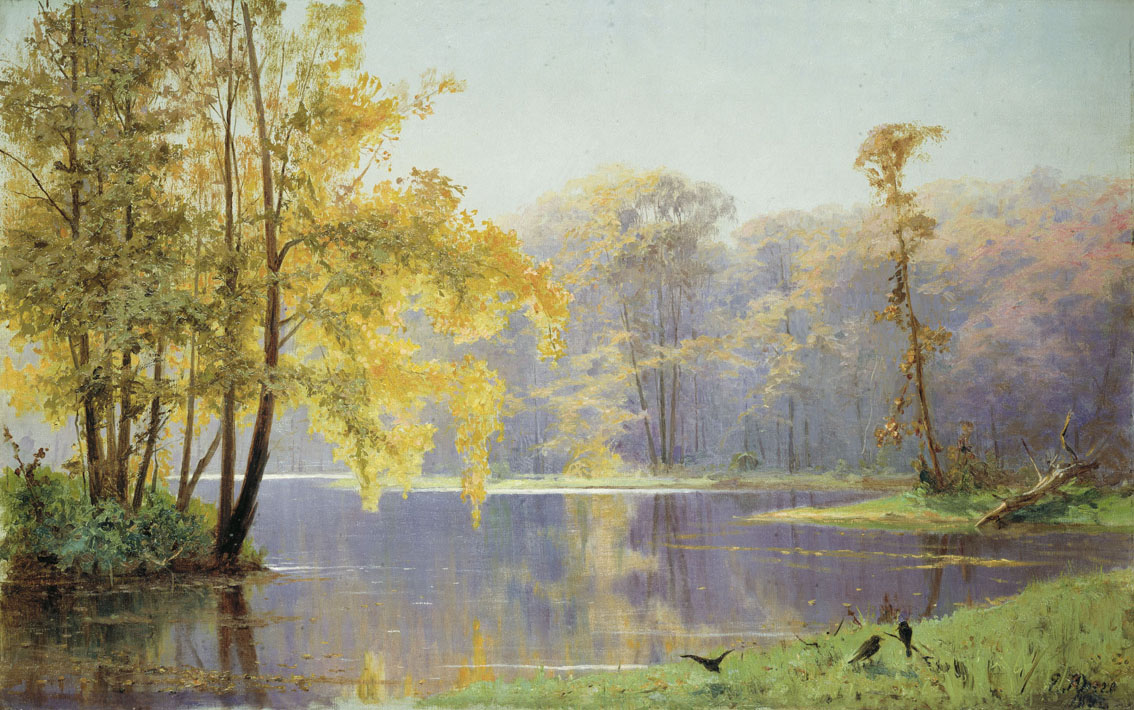
"Fall Day in the Lefortovo Palace Garden in Moscow", 1892 by Junge

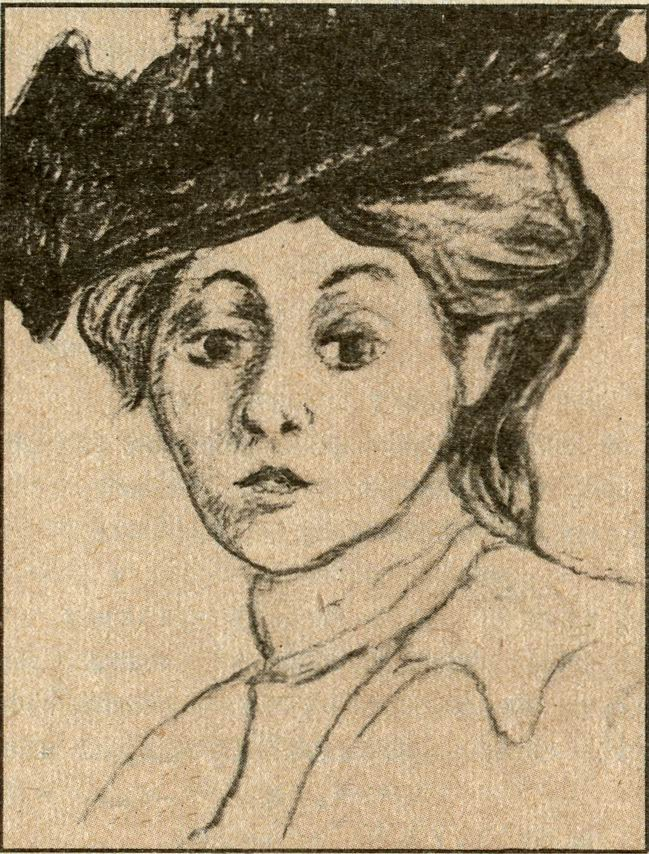
A drawing of her by Maximilian Voloshin

Countess Tolstaya hosted a liberal salon in Saint Petersburg. She married Professor Eduard Junge, a notable ophthalmologist, in 1863. After the professor settled into retirement, the couple bought a large tract of land at the Crimean coast. They later sold parcels of land for villa sites, giving birth to the resort village of Koktebel. The spouses lived separately after 1890.

Junge died in Moscow in 1913 and was buried at the graveyard of the Donskoy Monastery. She left several memoirs concerning her father and Taras Shevchenko, among others. Her reminiscences about Nicholas I of Russia were used by Leo Tolstoy for his novella Hadji Murat. Her watercour paintings are in many Russian galleries.

== Works ==
- Junge E.F. (born countess Tolstoi) Memories: (1843–1860 years) Series: Historical Library, volume X, Book publishing "Sphinx", 1914
- Junge E.F. / Memories of N.I. Kostomarov // Kievan antiquity, 1890. - T 28. -. № 1. - S. 22-34.
- Junge E.F., Memories. Correspondence. Oeuvre. 1843-1911, publisher "Kutchkovo Pole", Moscow, 2017
