= Vasili Pukirev =

Russian painter

- Василий Пукирев
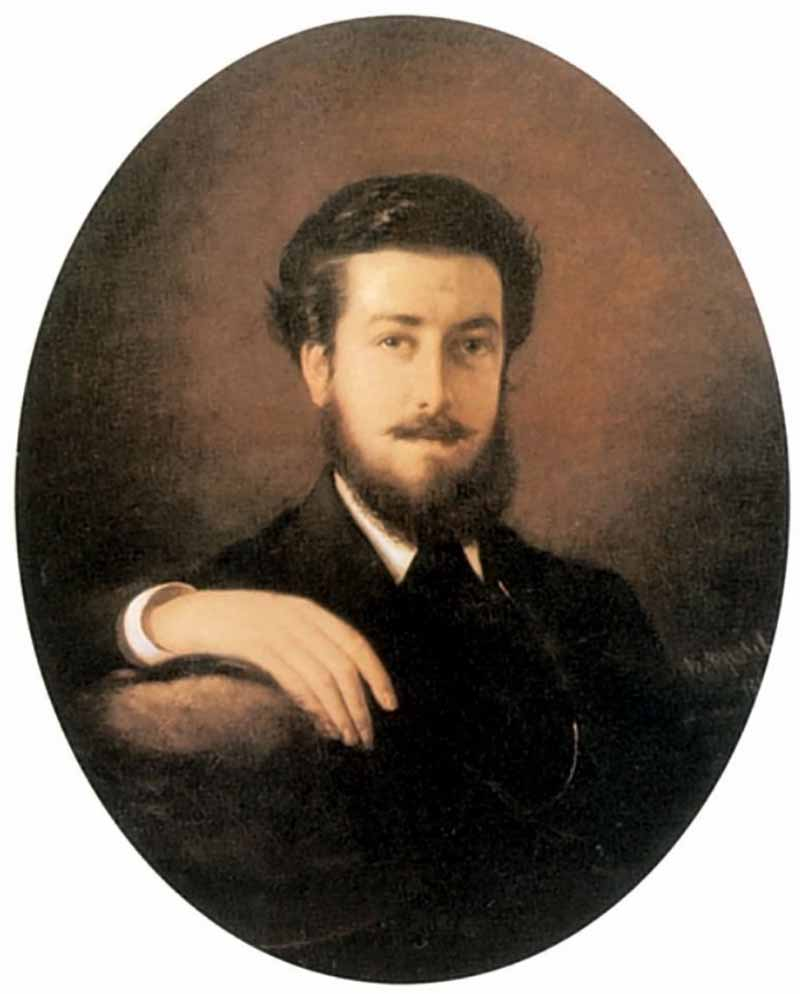
- Self-portrait (1868)
- Born: Vasili Vladimirovich Pukirev; 13 December 1832; Tula Governorate, Russia
- Died: 1 June 1890 (aged 57); Moscow, Russia
- Education: Member Academy of Arts (1860); Professor by rank (1863)
- Alma mater: Moscow School of Painting
- Known for: Painting
- Movement: Realism

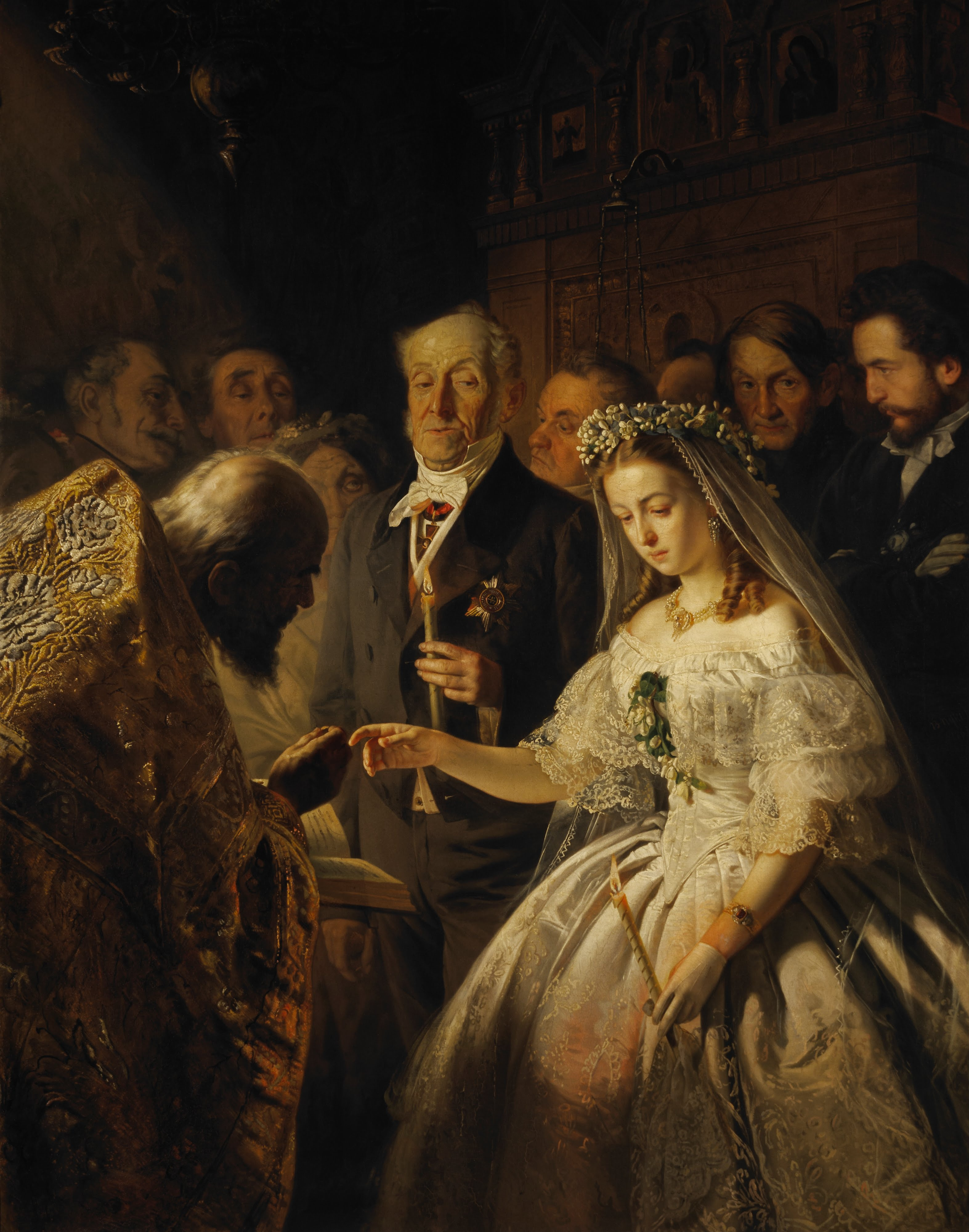
The Unequal Marriage (1863). The figure on the far right is Pukirev.

Vasili Vladimirovich Pukirev (Russian: Василий Владимирович Пукирев; 13 December [O.S. 1 December] 1832 – 13 June [O.S. 1 June] 1890) was a Russian painter in the Realist style, active in Moscow during Tsars Alexander II and Alexander III's reigns, best known for his genre pictures.

== Biography ==
He was born to a peasant family and was originally apprenticed to an icon painter in Mogilev. By sheer luck, he was able to enroll at the Moscow School of Painting, Sculpture and Architecture (MSPSA), where he studied from 1847 to 1858 under the direction of Sergey Zaryanko and Apollon Mokritsky. After 1850, he was certified to serve as an art teacher in the public schools. In 1855 he was awarded the title of "Artist" and, in 1858, became a "Free Artist".

In 1860, he became an "Academician" for history and portrait painting. He settled in an apartment near the MSPSA and taught there through 1873. In 1862 and 1864, he was able to travel abroad to "view art galleries" under the sponsorship of the Moscow Society of Art Lovers. In 1869, he collaborated with Alexei Savrasov to prepare a drawing course for use in the public schools. In addition to his paintings, he created icons and illustrations for the works of Gogol and Turgenev.

Four years later, he was forced to give up teaching due to poor health. In 1879, his fellow artists got together to provide him with a modest pension, but he died in poverty and nearly forgotten in 1890.

=== The Unequal Marriage ===
His best known painting is "The Unequal Marriage". Pukirev appears at the far right of the canvas (possibly as best man), giving rise to the story that it represented an episode of lost love in his own life. In 1863, on the basis of this work, he was named an honorary Professor at the Imperial Academy of Fine Arts. It also spawned a heated debate in the press, with his supporters praising it for presenting a serious theme from modern life, unlike the usual genre scenes, which tended to be nostalgic or sentimental. It is currently on display at the Tretyakov Gallery.

== Works ==
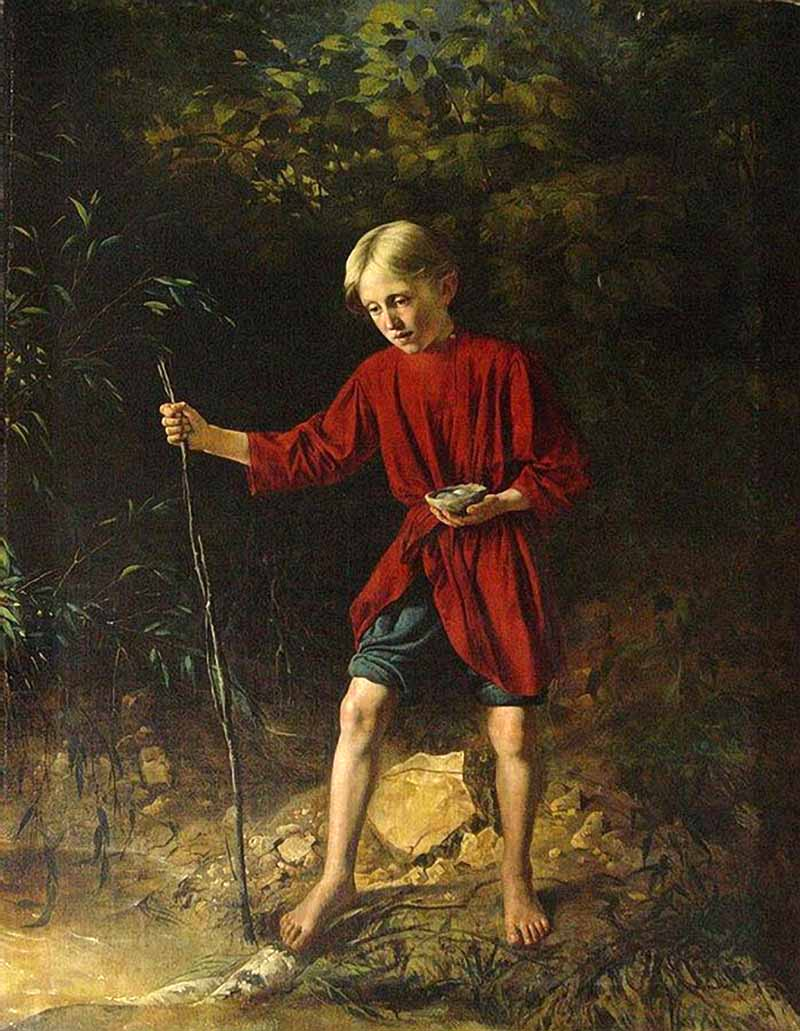
Boy with Bird's Nest (1856)

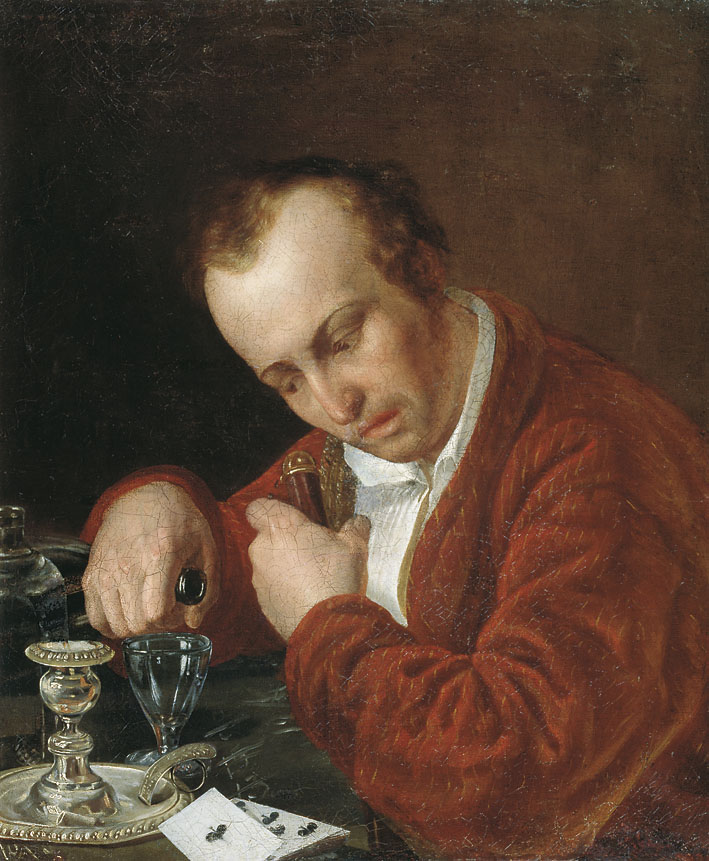
The Gambler (1865)

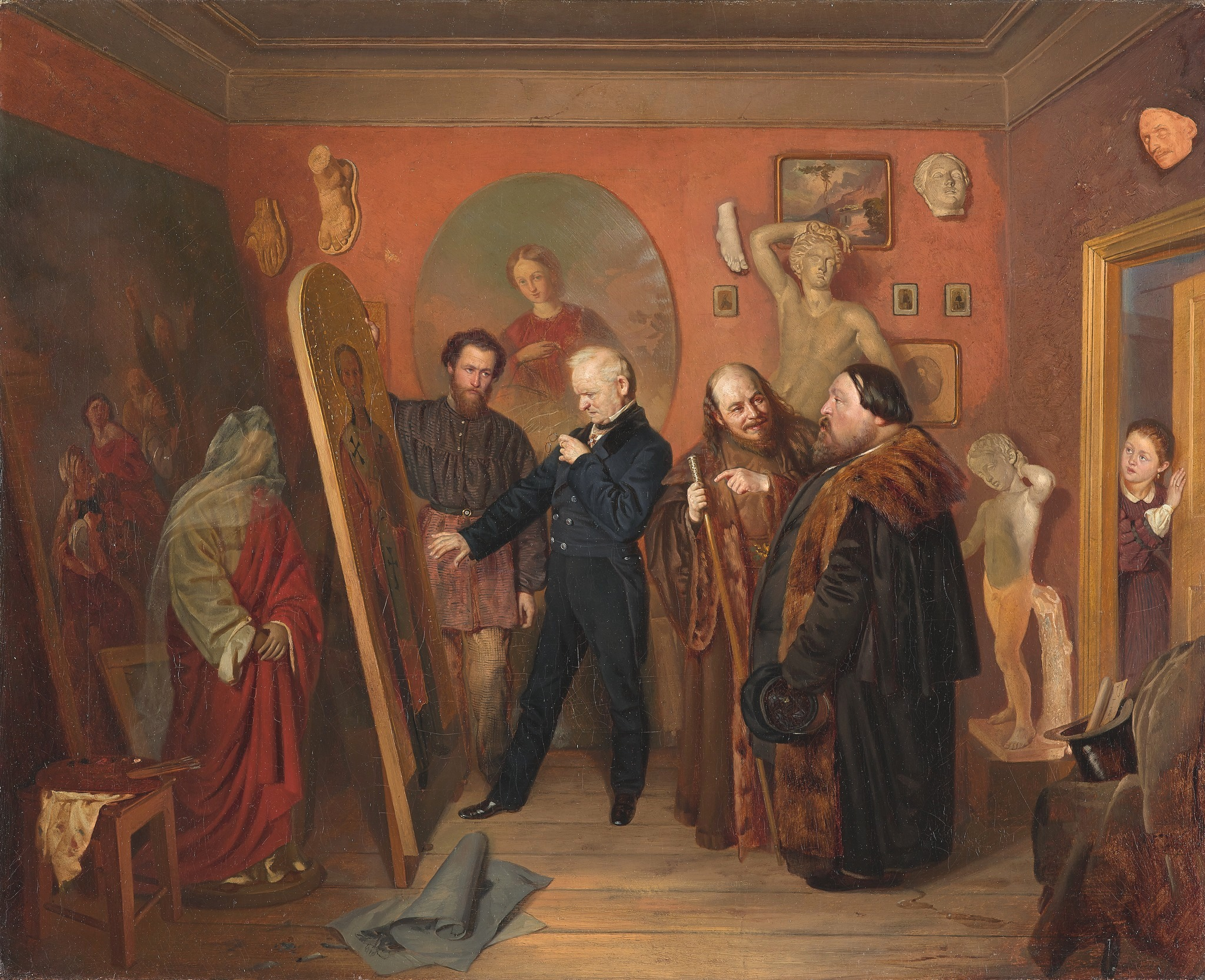
In the Artist's Studio (1865)

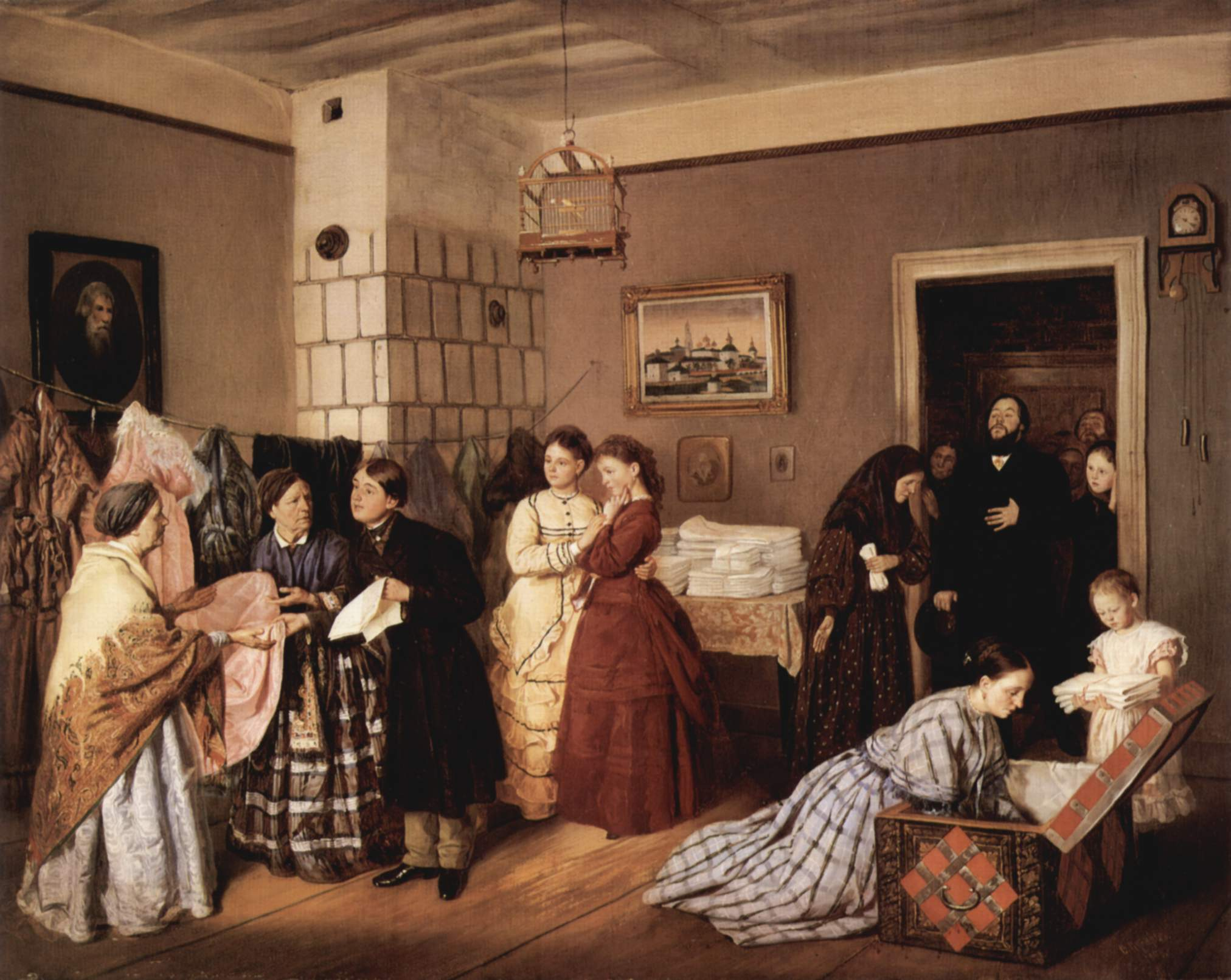
Reception of a Dowry in a Merchant Family (1873)

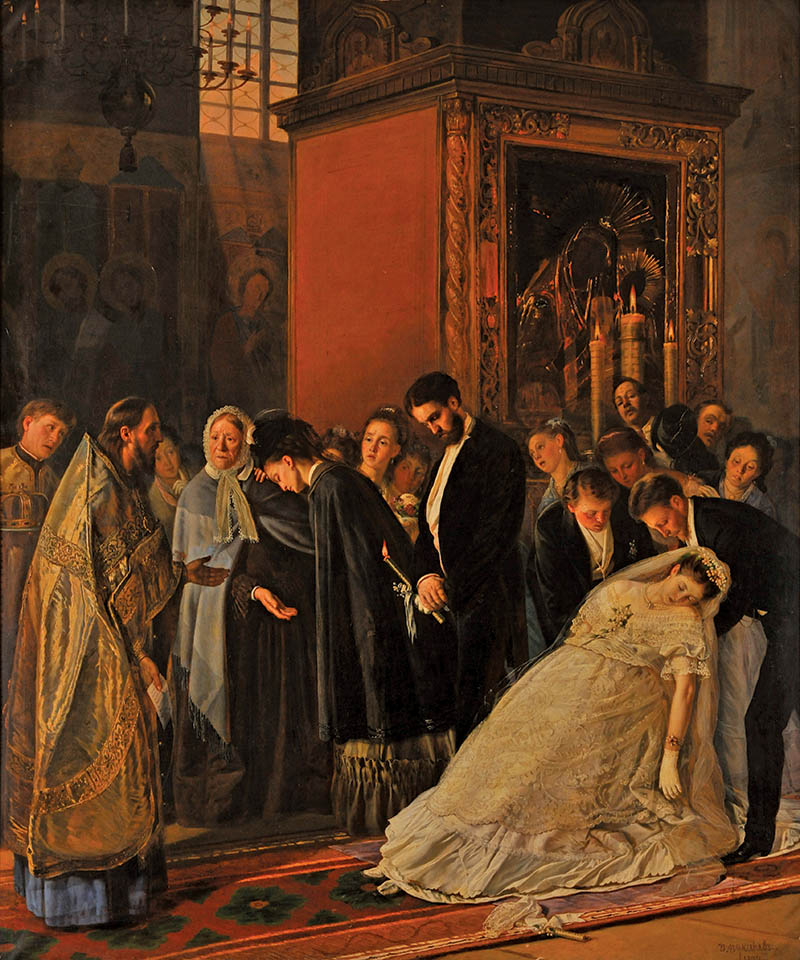
Wedding Interrupted (1877)
