= Sergey Zaryanko =

Belarusian portrait painter

- Сергей Константинович Зарянко
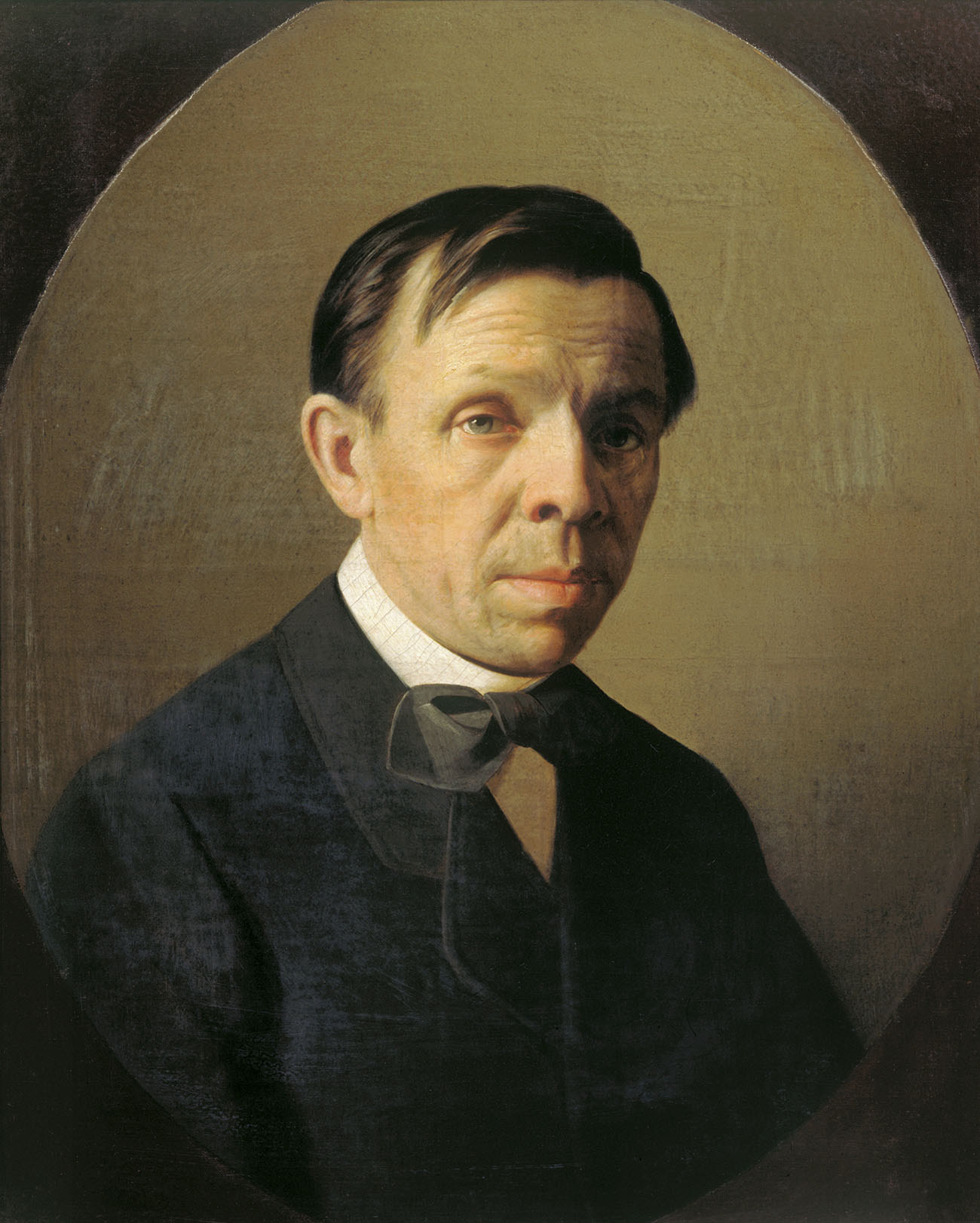
- Alexey Kolesov, Sergey Zaryanko, с. 1870–1874, oil on canvas; Tretyakov Gallery, Moscow
- Born: September 24, 1818; Lyady, Mogilev Governorate
- Died: December 20, 1870 (aged 52); Moscow
- Resting place: Novo-Alexeevsky Convent, Moscow
- Education: Member Academy of Arts (1843); Professor by rank (1850)
- Alma mater: Imperial Academy of Arts (1838)
- Known for: Portrait painting

Sergey Konstantinovich Zaryanko (Russian: Сергей Константинович Зарянко; 6 October 1818, Lyady – 1 January 1870, Moscow) was a Russian portrait painter and art teacher of Belarusian ancestry.

== Biography ==
He was the son of a serf on the estate of the Lubomirski family. After his father received his freedom, they moved to Saint Petersburg and entered the employ of Alexander Golitsyn, who would later be a government minister. He showed an early aptitude for art and received his first lessons from Vasily Avrorin. In 1834, thanks to a recommendation from Alexey Venetsianov, he was able to begin auditing classes at the Imperial Academy of Arts.

At first, he painted interiors rather than portraits and studied landscape painting with Maxim Vorobiev. In 1836, he was awarded a silver medal. Two years later, he received the title of "Artist" and was awarded another silver medal in 1841.

In 1843, he was named an "Academician" and went to Moscow, where he became a teacher at the Alexandrov Military Institute and worked as an icon painter. Beginning in 1846, he also gave classes at the Moscow Palace Architectural School, but soon returned to Saint Petersburg and began doing portraits. In 1849, his paintings of General Pyotr Karlovich Lomnovsky (1798-1860) and the opera singer, Osip Petrov, established his reputation in that field. The following year, his portrait of Fyodor Tolstoy earned him the title of "Professor".

In 1856, on the recommendation of Feodor Pryanishnikov, he began working at the Moscow School of Painting, Sculpture and Architecture as a senior Professor of painting and had many notable students there; including Vasily Perov, Illarion Pryanishnikov and Vasili Pukirev. He painted little during the 1860s, focusing instead on teaching. Having suffered from eyestrain for many years, it is believed that he may have lost his sight in one eye. He is said to have died suddenly.

== Works ==
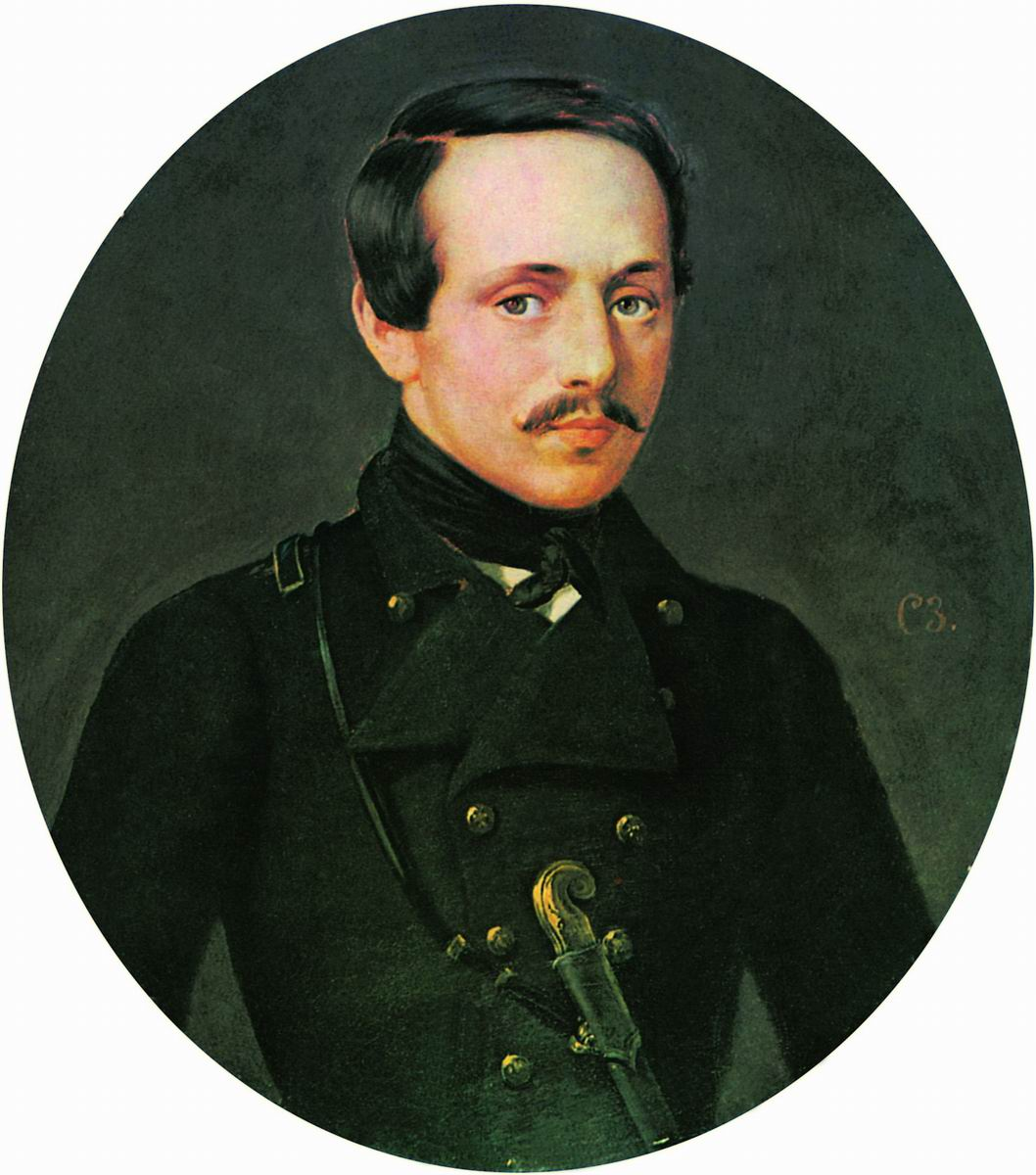
Mikhail Lermontov (1842)

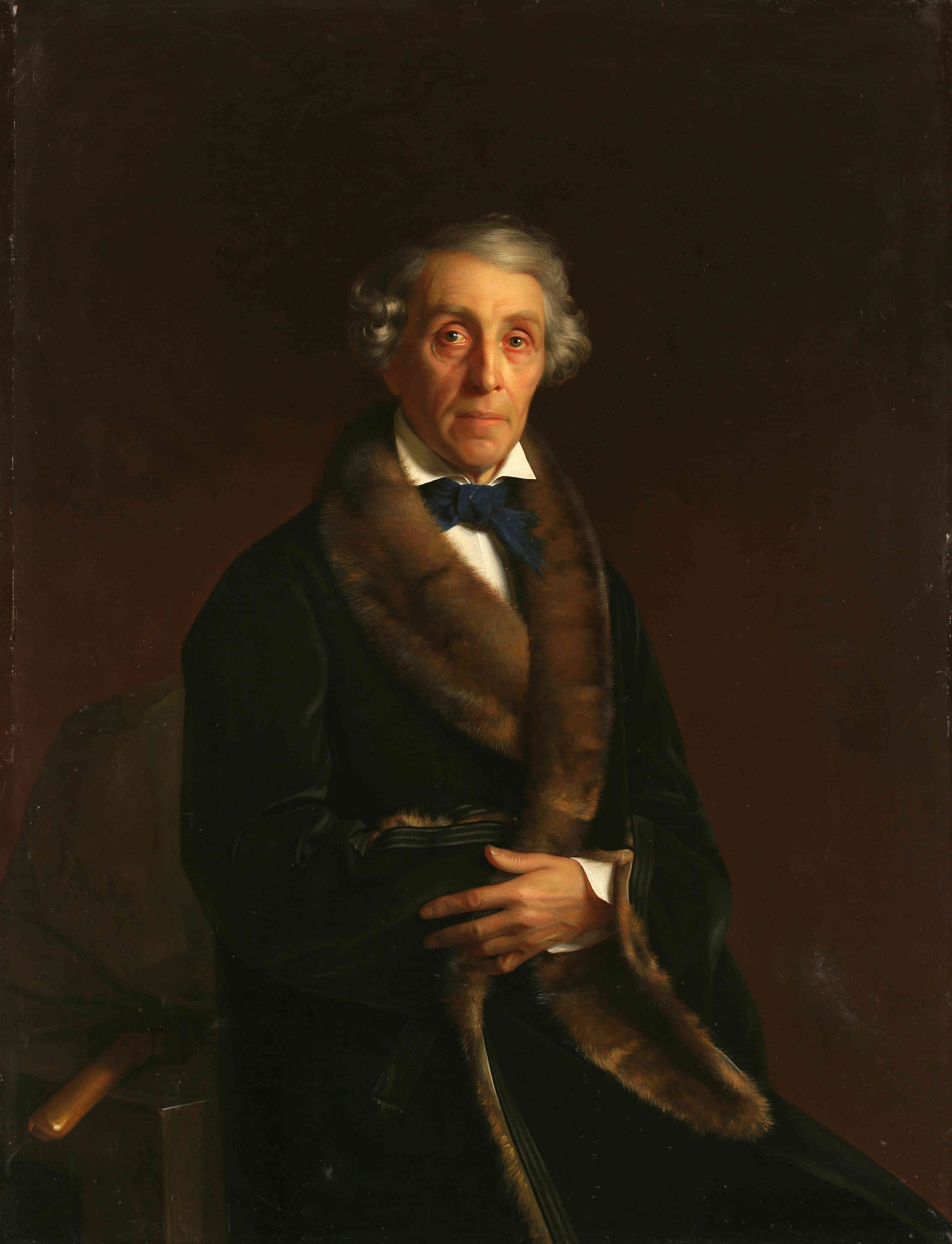
Portrait of Fyodor Tolstoy (1850)

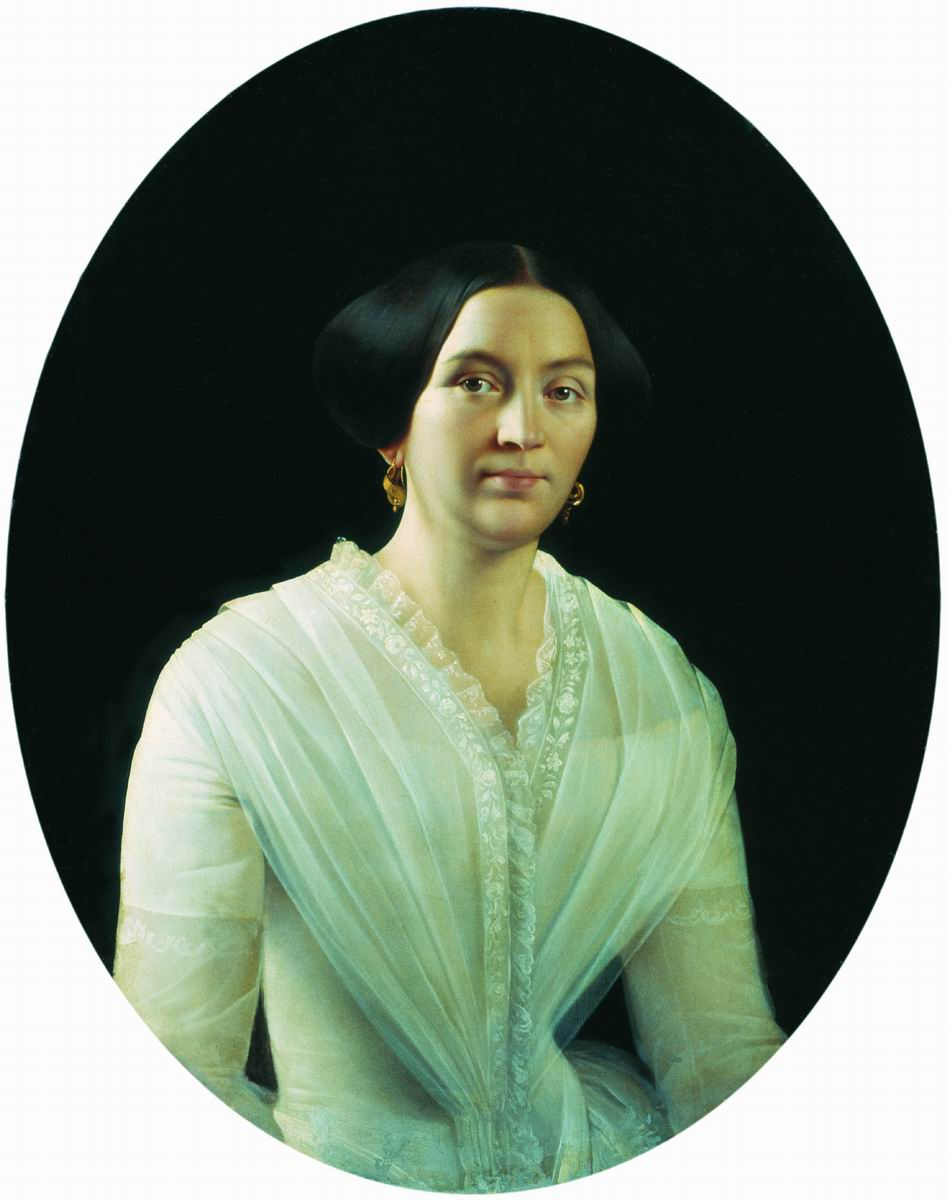
Portrait of Anisya Lesnikova (1850)

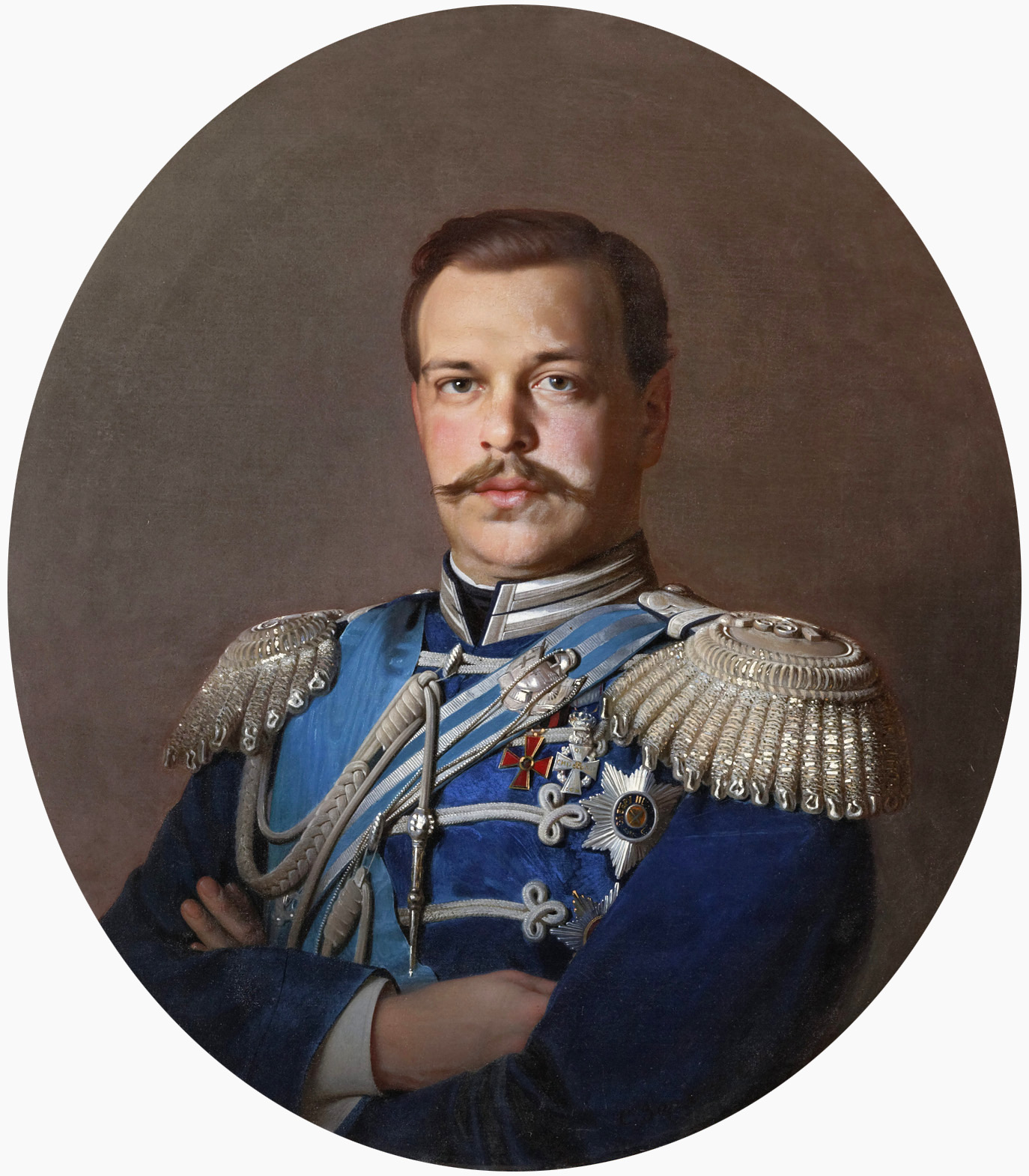
Alexander III (c. 1866–1871)

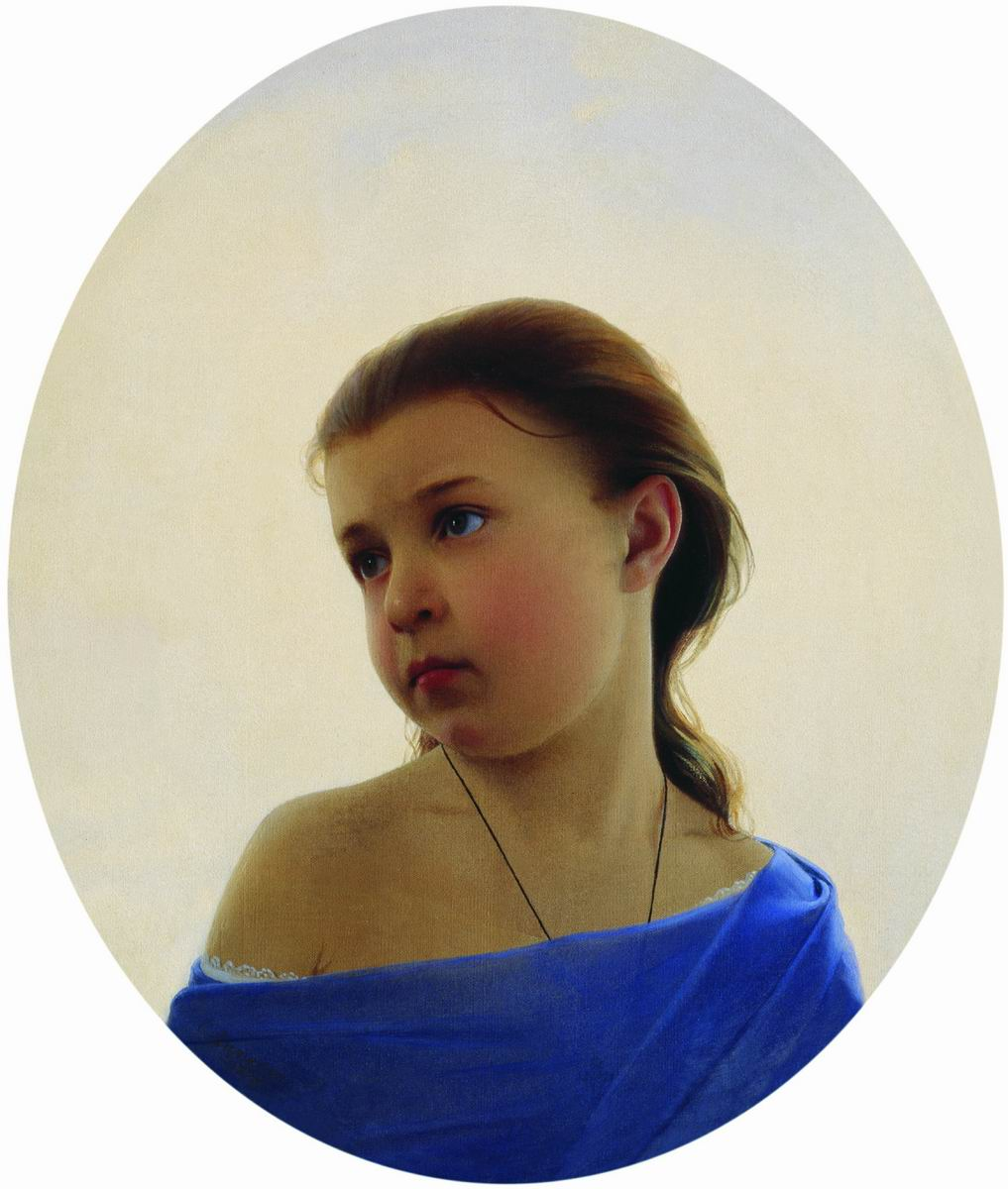
Portrait of Natalia Zaryanko, the artist's daughter (1870)
