= Tarussky Uyezd =

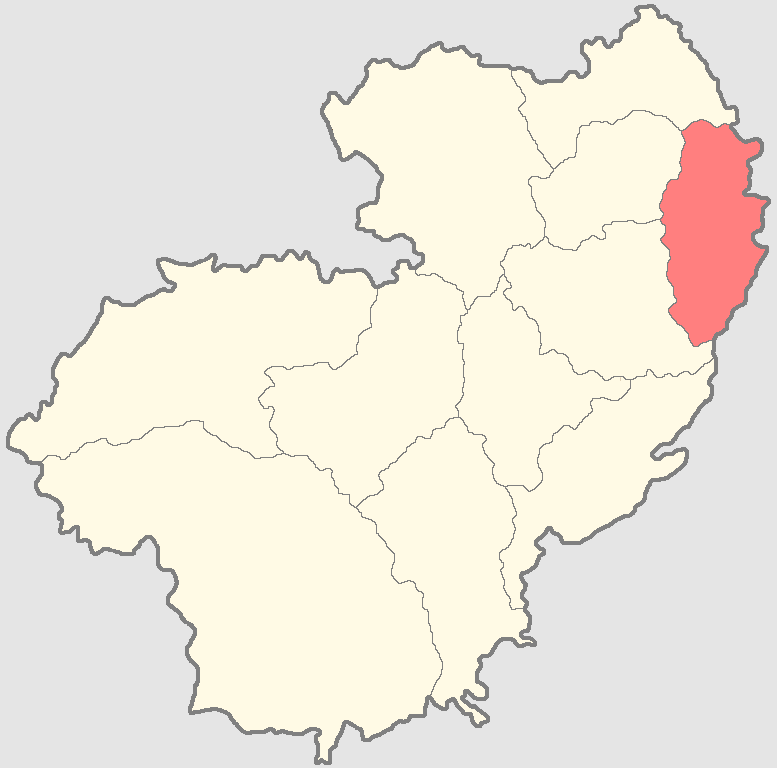
Tarusa County on the map of Kaluga Governorate

Tarussky Uyezd (Тару́сский уе́зд) was one of the subdivisions of the Kaluga Governorate of the Russian Empire. It was situated in the northeastern part of the governorate. Its administrative centre was Tarusa.

== Demographics ==
At the time of the Russian Empire Census of 1897, Tarussky Uyezd had a population of 58,149. Of these, 99.8% spoke Russian, 0.1% German and 0.1% Polish as their native language.
