= Alexei Stepanov =

Russian painter

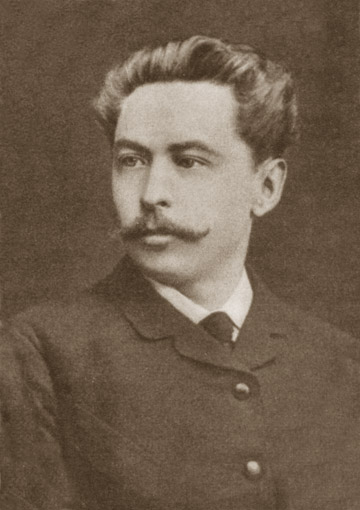
Alexei Stepanov (date unknown)

Alexei Stepanovich Stepanov (Russian: Алексей Степанович Степанов; 6 May 1858, in Simferopol – 5 October 1923, in Moscow) was a Russian genre painter, illustrator and art teacher. He was a member of the Peredvizhniki and a founder of the "Union of Russian Artists".

== Biography ==
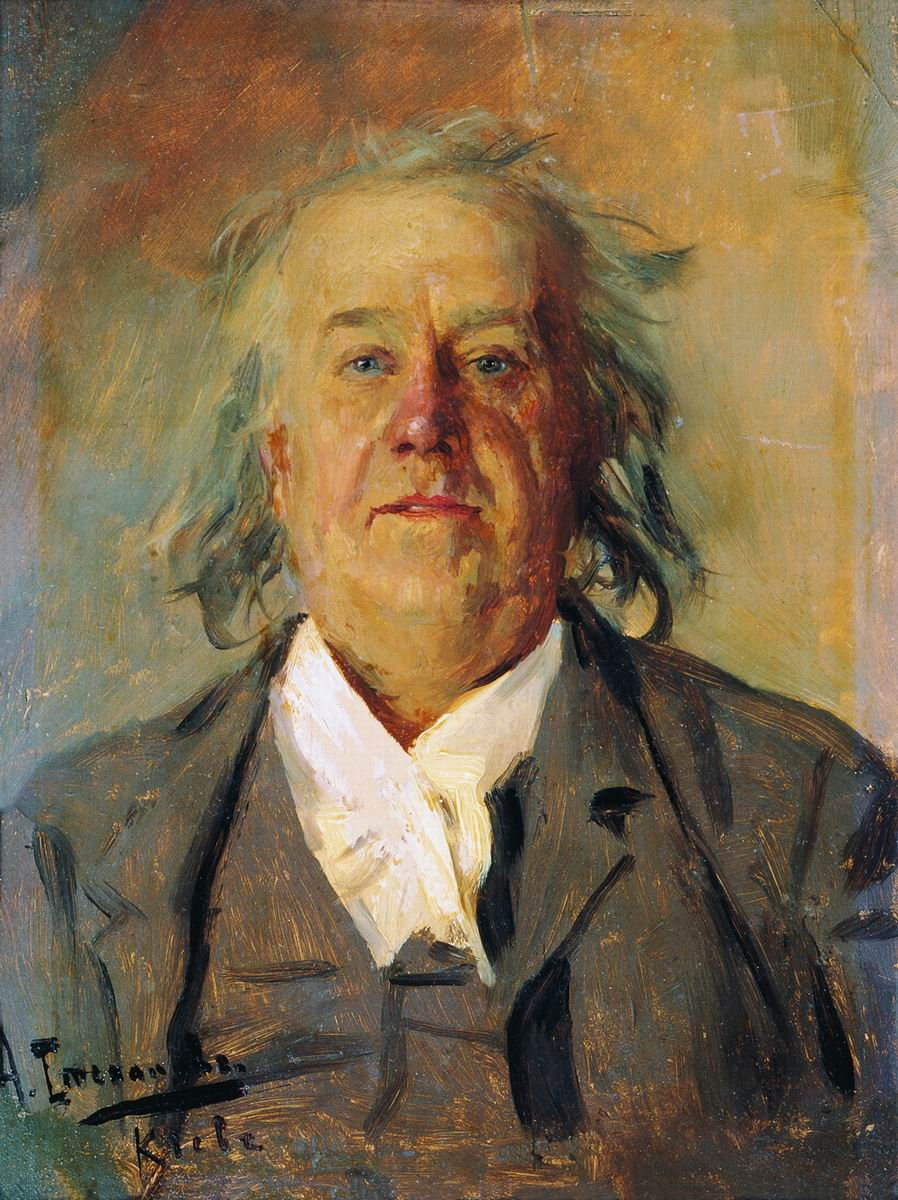
Portrait of his father-in-law, Nikolai Medyntsev (1902)

His father, who was from a noble family, served as an officer in the Crimean War. His mother died not long after his birth, and his father followed in 1863, so he was taken to a special branch of the Moscow Orphanage (for children from military families), located on an estate formerly owned by Count Alexey Razumovsky.

After completing his public school education, Stepanov entered the Konstantin Surveying Institute and graduated as an official surveyor in 1879. From 1880 to 1883, he audited classes given by Illarion Pryanishnikov and Evgraf Sorokin at the Moscow School of Painting, Sculpture and Architecture. While there, he made the acquaintance of Leonid Sabaneyev, who edited the magazine Природа и Охота (Nature and Hunting), for which Stepanov provided over a hundred drawings from 1883 to 1895.

In 1888, he began exhibiting with the Peredvizhniki and, the following year, his painting "Moose Herd" was purchased by Pavel Tretyakov. During that same period, he became a lecturer at the "School of Fine Arts" operated by the architect Anatoly Gunst. Shortly after, Valentin Serov invited him to teach at his old alma mater, the Moscow School of Painting. He was later named a Professor and remained there until 1918. Among his notable students there were Sergey Gerasimov, Boris Ioganson, Pavel Korin and Leonard Turzhansky.

In 1894, he accompanied the art collector Nikolai Medyntsev (1841-1904) and his family on a trip to Europe, visiting Germany, Northern Italy and France, where he was influenced by the Impressionists. The following year, he married Medyntsev's daughter, Lyudmila. In 1903, he was part of the group that defected from the Peredvizhniki to form the "Union of Russian Artists". Two years later, he received the title of "Academician" from the Imperial Academy of Arts for his painting "Morning Greetings". From 1906 to 1914, he spent his summers at his estate in Tver Governorate.

After 1920, he became seriously ill, but continued to work. One of his last paintings "Качели" (The Swing) was acquired by the Carnegie Museums of Pittsburgh.

== Selected paintings ==
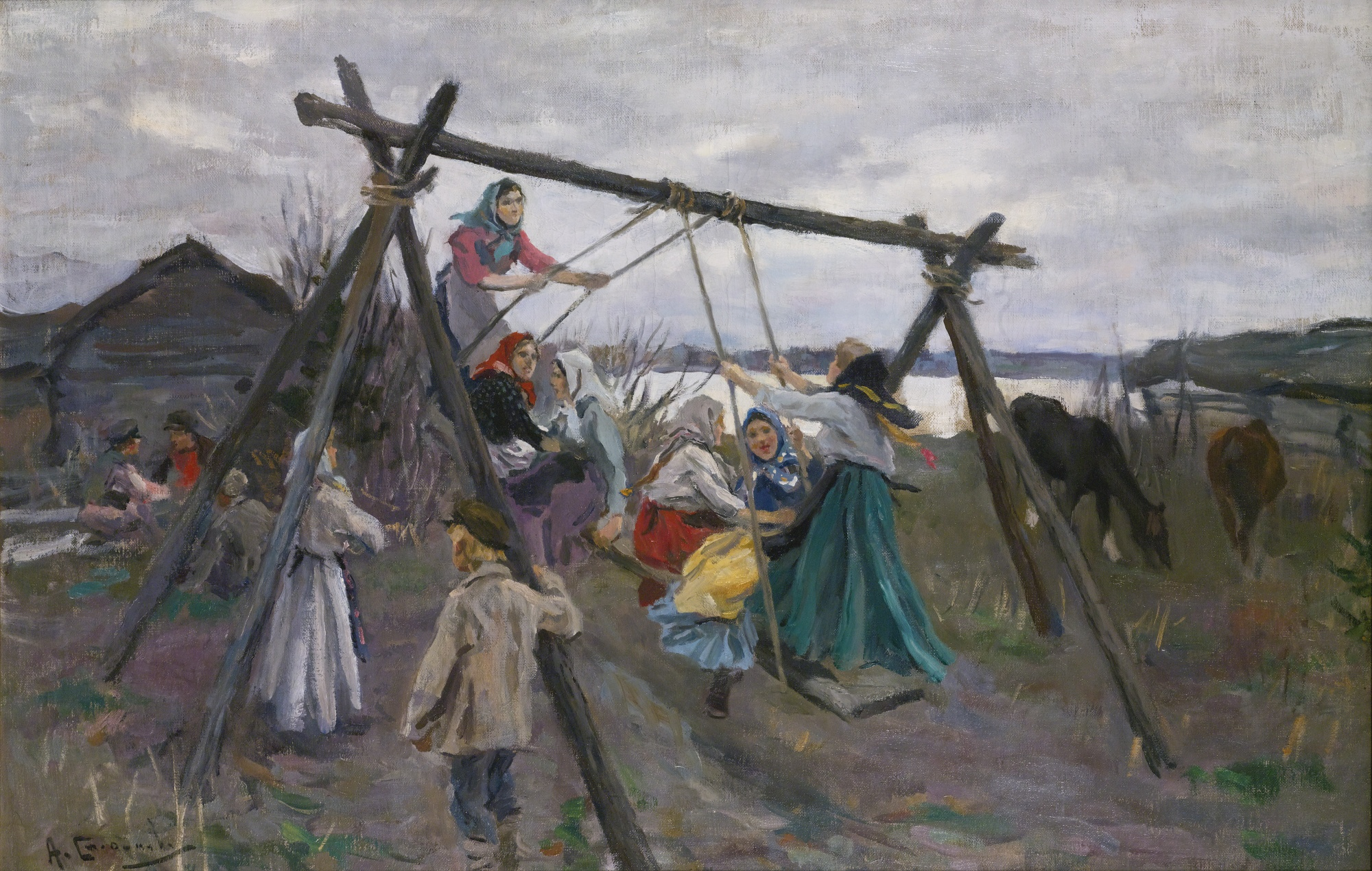
The Swing

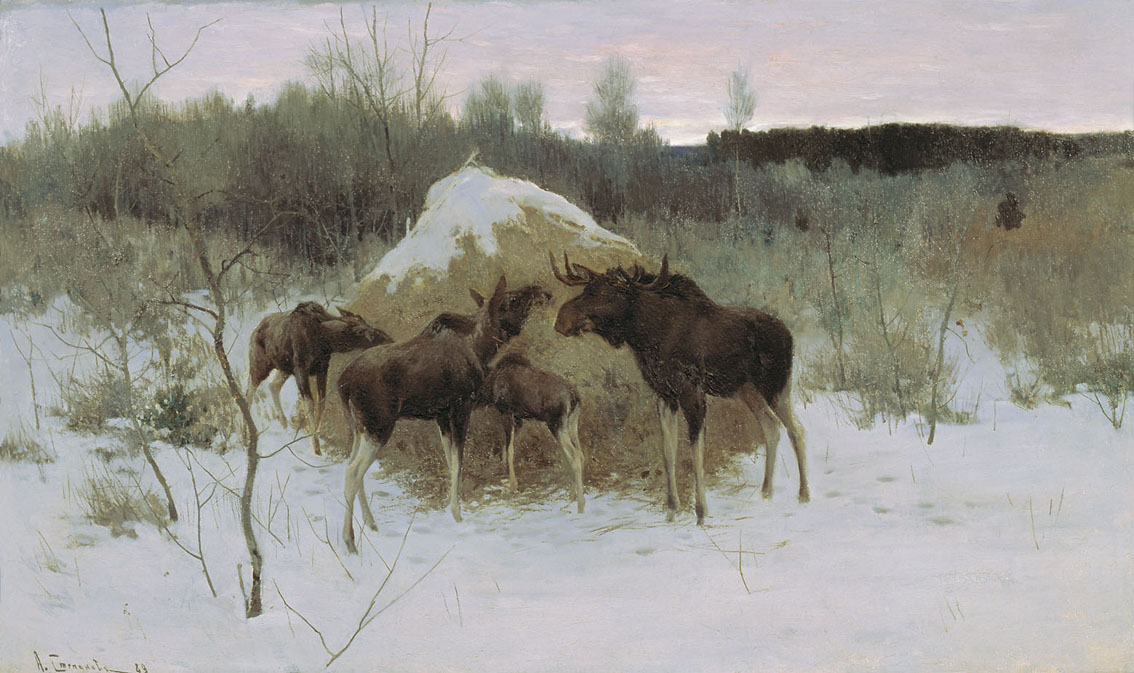
Moose Herd

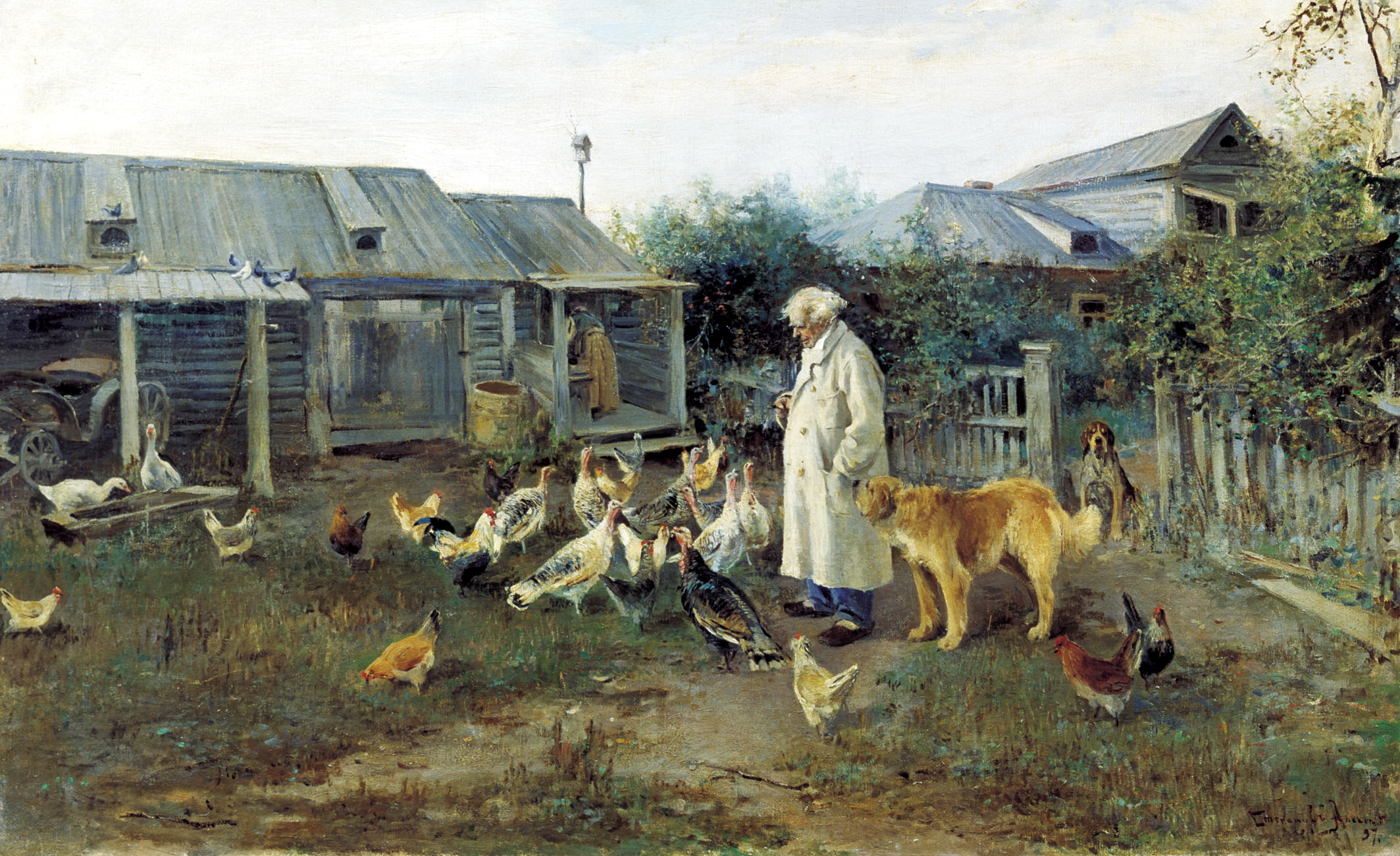
Morning Greetings
