= Leonard Turzhansky =

Russian artist (1875–1945)

Leonard Viktorovich Turzhansky (Russian: Леонард Викторович Туржанский; 1875 in Yekaterinburg – 1945 in Moscow) was an impressionist painter in the Russian Empire and later the Soviet Union.

== Biography ==
Leonard Turzhansky was born to a family of a medical doctor in Yekaterinburg a large Russian city in the Ural Mountains. Since his childhood Leonard was involved with arts and without hesitation he chose the career of a professional artist. Turzhansky studied at the Central School of Technical Drawing in Saint Petersburg (1895); the Stroganov Art school (1896–97); and under such famous artists as Alexei Stepanov, Valentin Serov and Konstantin Korovin at the Moscow School of Painting, Sculpture and Architecture (1898–1909).

Among his early works were portraits (Portrait of Bunin, portrait of actress Petrova) and genre paintings. But later he became an exclusively landscape painter. Many of his landscapes have animalist motifs; with emphasis on domestic animals: horses, cows, goats. Many of his works are inspired by the nature of the Ural Mountains, particular of the Maly Istok village near Yekaterinburg. Even after moving to Moscow he came there every spring. However, Turzhansky also rendered several beautiful landscapes of Russia's Capital, Moscow.

Turzhanovsky exhibited his works with Peredvizhniki and since 1912 became a member of the Union of Russian Artists. Artistically he was strongly connected with traditions of the 19th century Russian art but was one of the first among the Union of Russian Artists members who adopted many methods of impressionism.

== Artwork ==
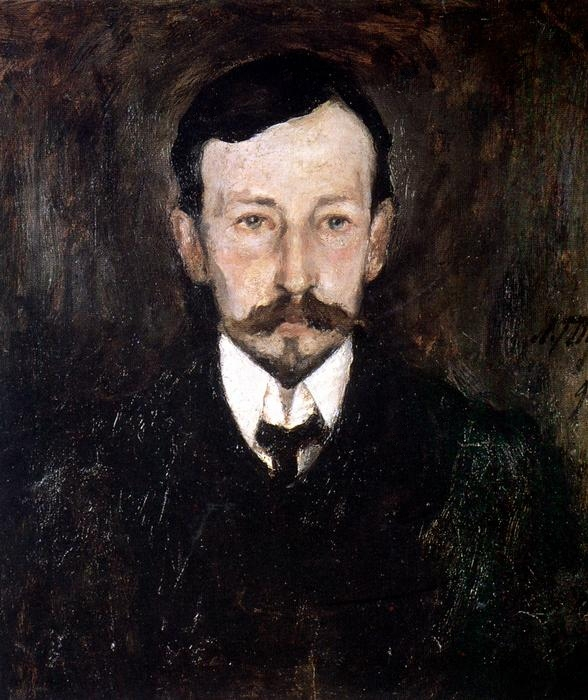
Portrait of Ivan Bunin, 1905

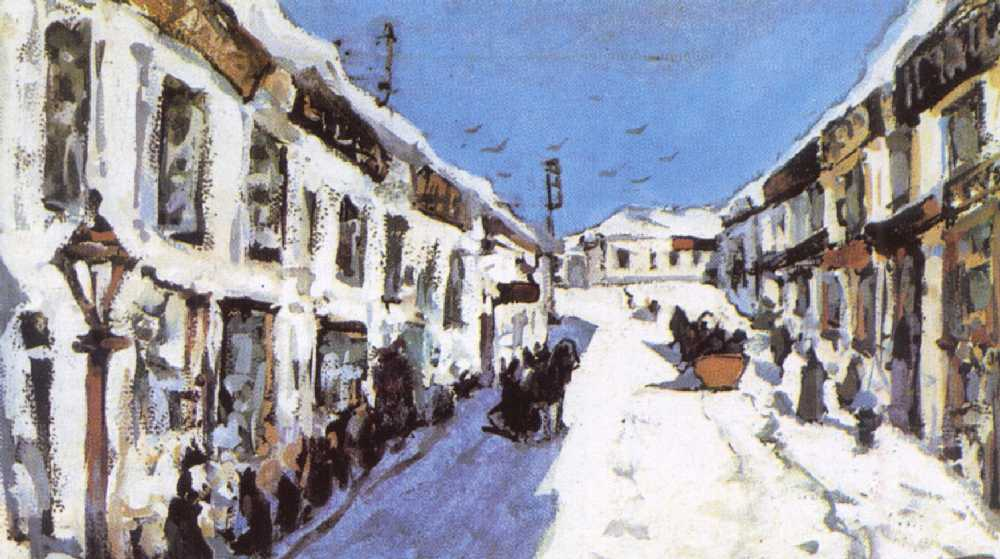
Winter, 1910s

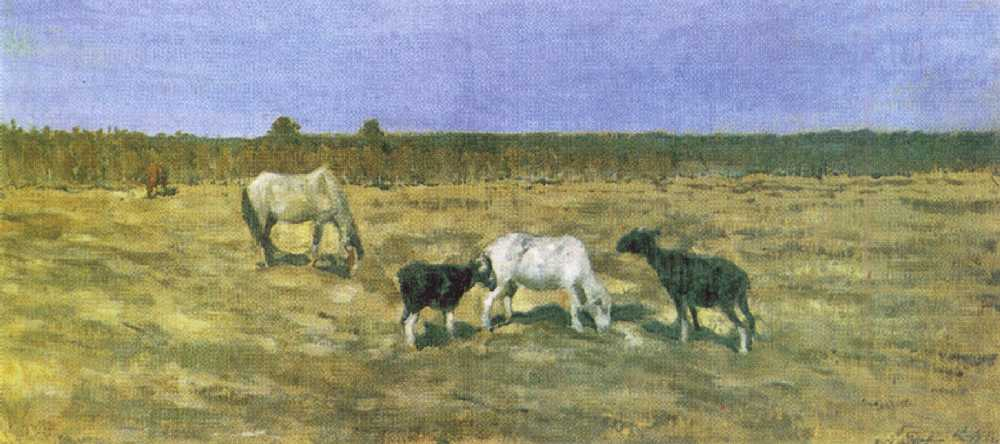
Steppe. Spring, 1911

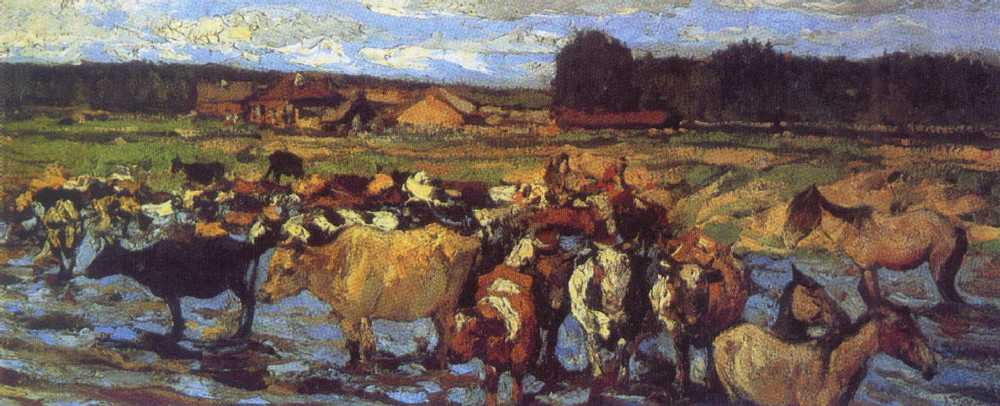
Midday, 1914
