= Fyodor Tolstoy (artist) =

Russian sculptor

Count Fyodor Tolstoy
- Фёдор Толстой
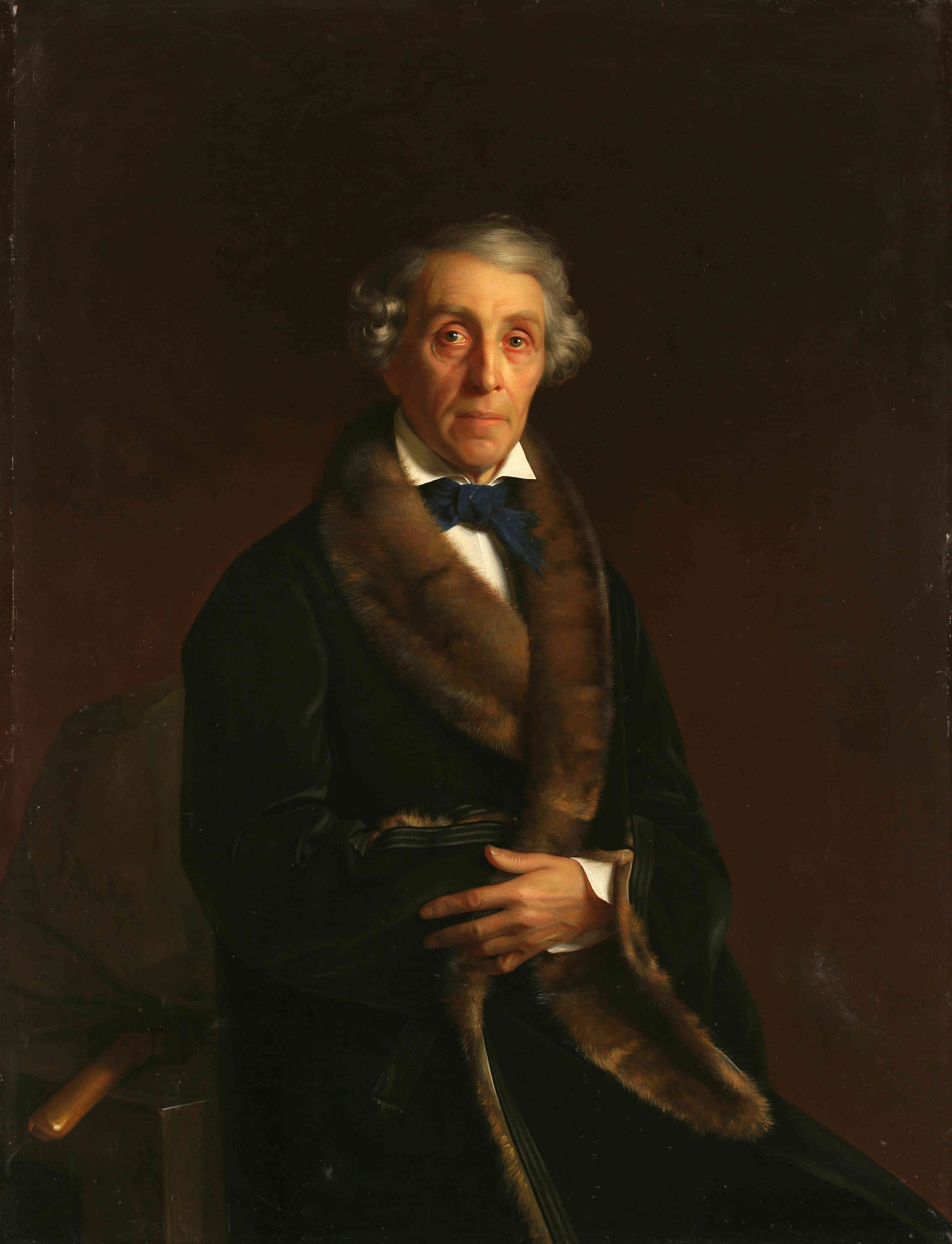
- Count Fyodor Tolstoy by Sergey Zaryanko (1850)
- Born: Fyodor Petrovich Tolstoy; 21 February 1783; St. Petersburg, Russian Empire
- Died: 25 April 1873 (aged 90); St. Petersburg, Russian Empire
- Resting place: Lazarevskoe Cemetery, St. Petersburg
- Known for: medal art
- Style: Neoclassicism
- Spouse(s): Anna Dudina (m. 1810; died 1835) Anastasia Ivanova (m. 1838)
- Children: 4, including Mariya Kamenskaya and Ekaterina Junge

Count Fyodor Petrovich Tolstoy (Russian: Фёдор Петрович Толстой; 21 February 1783 – 25 April 1873) was a Russian artist who served as Vice-President of the Imperial Academy of Arts for forty years (1828–1868). His works – wax-reliefs, watercolours, medallions, and silhouettes – are distinguished by a cool detachment and spare and economical classicism.

== Biography ==
Fyodor Tolstoy came from the Tolstoy family. His father Count Pyotr Andreyevich Tolstoy, governed a ministry of war supplies. Tolstoy early began to paint under the direction of his mother, Elizabeth Barbot-de-Marni. His first drawings, which are now stored in the Tretyakov Gallery, were made when he was 4 years old. At the age of nine he went to the foster care of his rich and influential cousin, Count Pyotr Aleksandrovich Tolstoy.

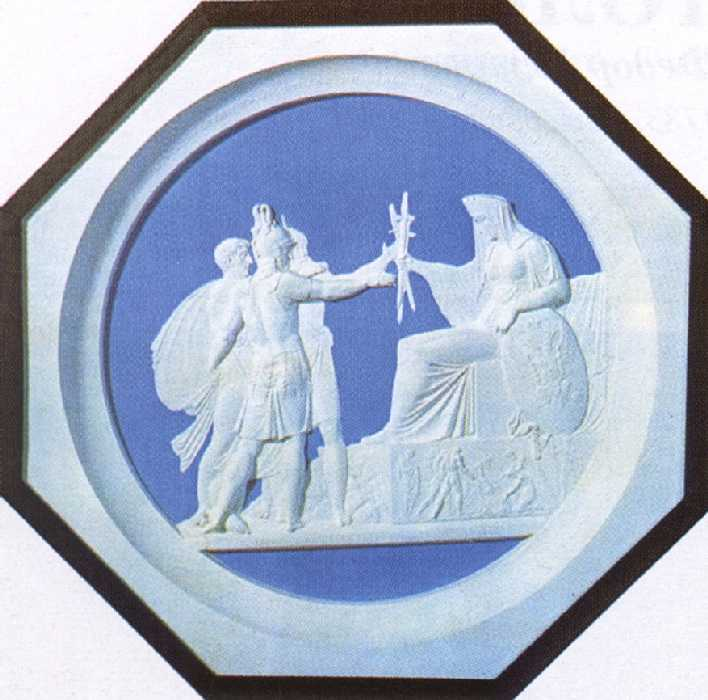
In his colored wax medallion People's militia of 1812 (1816), Tolstoy owes a debt to David's "Oath of the Horatii" and to the ceramics of Josiah Wedgwood.

A year later, Fyodor entered the Jesuit College in Polotsk. Here, he studied painting, as well as the sciences. Upon his accession to the throne, Emperor Paul I summoned Pyotr Tolstoy to Saint Petersburg, and Fyodor Petrovich returned to his parents. At the same time, his father was fired, and the family's circumstances deteriorated.

From June 1798 to June 1802, Fyodor Petrovich was educated in the Naval Cadet Corps. After finishing, he continued his education under the direction of famous scientists. He studied mathematics, astronomy, political economy, zoology, archaeology and numismatics. He also frequented the riding academy, and became a dashing horseman.

In this time, without any supervision, he painted still lives, portraits and landscapes. After his father showed him a cameo depicting Napoleon, he started to learn the art of the medallist. Tolstoy visited the Imperial Academy of Arts' classes of plastic arts. One of his teachers was the most fashionable Russian portraitist of the time, Orest Kiprensky.

In 1804, Fyodor Tolstoy was appointed an adjutant of Admiral Pavel Chichagov, and was forced to retire. From 1806 he worked in the Hermitage Museum. In 1806, he painted the Confidence of Alexander of Macedon to doctor Philippos, the Judgement of Paris, the Labours of Hercules, etc. For his wax bas-relief the Triumphal entrance of Alexander of Macedon into Babylon (1809, now in the Hermitage Museum), Tolstoy was elected an honorable member of the Academy of Arts.

Family Portrait, 1830, oil on canvas; Russian Museum, St. Petersburg

Starting 23 September 1810 he worked in the Department of the Mint and became the founder of medal working in Russia. After the battle of Leipzig, he began a series of twenty-four medallions, devoted to the major battles of the Napoleonic Wars. Tolstoy's medallions acquired wide reputation not only in Russia, but also abroad. He was elected a member of almost all the European academies of fine arts. In 1861, he made his last medal, dedicated to the emancipation of the serfs.

From 1820 to 1833, he employed the Neoclassical technique of "raw sketch," or refined outline drawings without shading and hatchwork, to execute 63 illustrations for the Dushenka of Ippolit Bogdanovich. As regards painting, Tolstoy specialized in interior scenes, full of symmetrical lines and Neoclassical statuary. His Family Portrait (1830) "betrays a Romantic fascination with both psychological detail and tricks of lighting, perspective, and frames".

In 1816, he became involved in freemasonry, eventually participating in the organization of the so-called "Lancasterian schools," designed to propagate literacy. Although he was close to the founding fathers of the Decembrist societies, Tolstoy did not participate in their unsuccessful revolt. In 1826, he wrote two treatises for Nicholas I, About the moral state of troops of Russia and About the state of the Russian Empire in connection to its internal organization, in which he proposed a series of legislative, social and tax reforms.

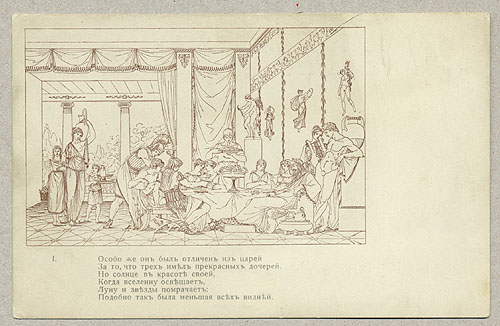
One of Tolstoy's Neoclassical illustrations to Dushenka (1820–33).

In 1838, Tolstoy composed the ballet The Aeolian Harp. He wrote the libretto, carried out sketches for costumes, and, in more than sixty pictures, determined the choreography. In 1842, he composed a second ballet, based on Greek myth, Echo. Unfortunately, neither of them was mounted.

In 1843 his daughter Ekaterina Fedorovna Tolstaya was born. She would become a painter and marry Professor Eduard Junge.

Pushkin, who regarded Tolstoy as the finest of contemporary Russian artists, referred to him, not surprisingly, in his novel Eugene Onegin. In an 1825 letter to his brother, Pushkin asked him to procure a vignette for the new edition of his poems: "What about having it done by Tolstoy's magic brush? No - too expensive, but how terrifically sweet" (the last line is taken from Ivan Dmitriev's fable "The Fashionable Woman").

== Publications ==
- Tolstoy, Fyodor P. (2001). Chekunova, Antonina Ye. (ed.). Записки графа Фёдора Петровича Толстого. История и память (in Russian). Moscow: Russian State Humanitarian University. ISBN 5-7281-0352-9.
