= Medynsky Uyezd =

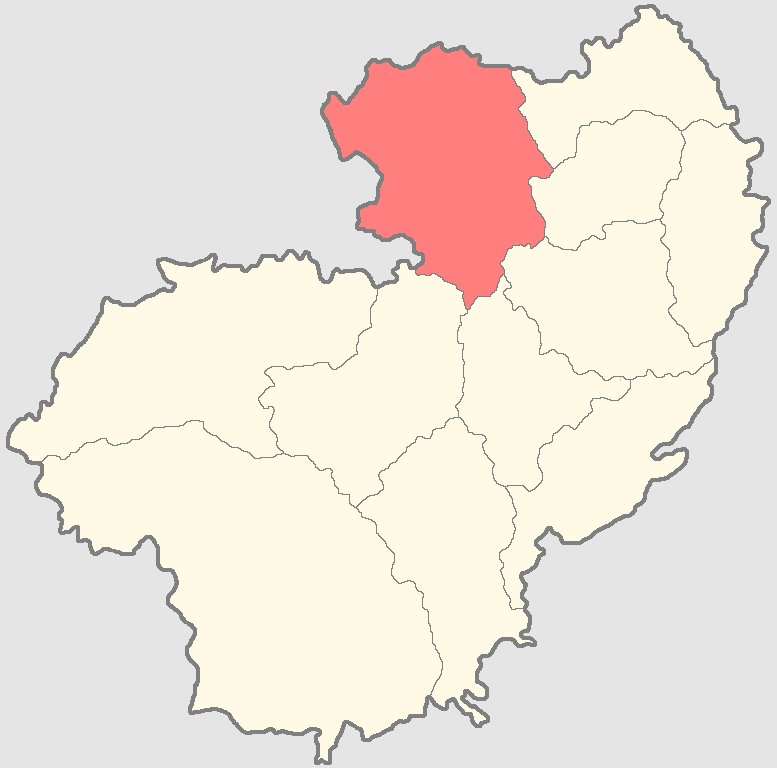

Medynsky Uyezd (Меды́нский уе́зд) was one of the subdivisions of the Kaluga Governorate of the Russian Empire. It was situated in the northern part of the governorate. Its administrative centre was Medyn.

== Demographics ==
At the time of the Russian Empire Census of 1897, Medynsky Uyezd had a population of 103,945. Of these, 99.8% spoke Russian, 0.1% German and 0.1% Romani as their native language.
