= Nikolai Tikhonravov =

Russian philologist and historian of Russian literature

- Николай Саввич Тихонравов
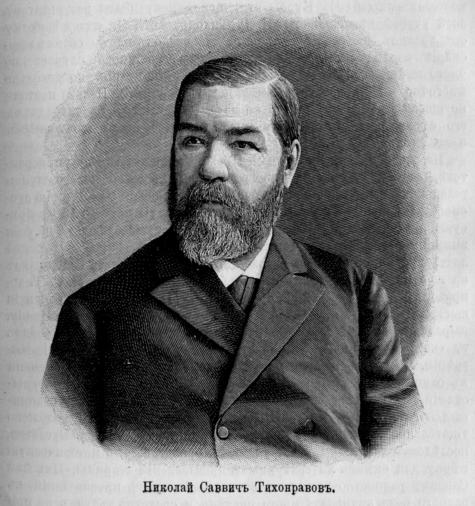
- Born: Nikolai Savvich Tikhonravov; 15 October 1832; Meshchovsky Uyezd, Kaluga Governorate, Russian Empire
- Died: 9 December 1893 (aged 61); Moscow, Russian Empire
- Occupations: philologist, historian of literature

Nikolai Savvich Tikhonravov (Russian: Никола́й Са́ввич Тихонра́вов; 15 October 1832 – 9 December 1893) was a Russian philologist and historian of Russian literature.

Born in the Meshchovsky Uyezd of Kaluga Governorate to a doctor's family, he received secondary education at the Moscow's Third Gymnasium and, while still an 18-year old Pedagogical Institute student, debuted as published author in Moskvityanin with an essay called "Gaius Valerius Catullus and his Works". Among the scholars impressed by it was Mikhail Pogodin who insisted upon his transfer to Moscow University where in 1857, after graduation, Tikhonravov started to read Russian literature.

Tikhonravov, an expert on the so-called 'otrechennaya' (banned by the church) literature, published Chronicles of Russian Ancient Literature (1859-1866, in five volumes) and Monuments of the Banned Literature (1863, in two volumes). Among other acclaimed collections which he was the publisher of, were The Collected Works by Nikolai Gogol (1890, seven volumes) and Works of Russian Drama, 1672—1725 (1874). The history of old Russian theatre has been revived and thoroughly documented by Tikhonravov's efforts exclusively. He authored numerous essays and articles of the works of Antioh Cantemir, Mikhail Lomonosov and Alexander Sumarokov, among others.

In 1882 Tikhonravov was honoured with the title Meritorious Professor of Moscow University, of which he was rector, in 1877–1883. In 1890 he was elected a member of the St Petersburg Academy of Sciences.
