= Maloyaroslavetsky Uyezd =

Maloyaroslavetsky Uyezd (Малояросла́вецкий уе́зд) was one of the subdivisions of the Kaluga Governorate of the Russian Empire. It was situated in the northeastern part of the governorate. Its administrative centre was Maloyaroslavets.

== Demographics ==
At the time of the Russian Empire Census of 1897, Maloyaroslavetsky Uyezd had a population of 41,022. Of these, 99.5% spoke Russian, 0.2% Belarusian, 0.1% Latvian and 0.1% Polish as their native language.
