= Borovsky Uyezd =

Subdivision of Russian Empire

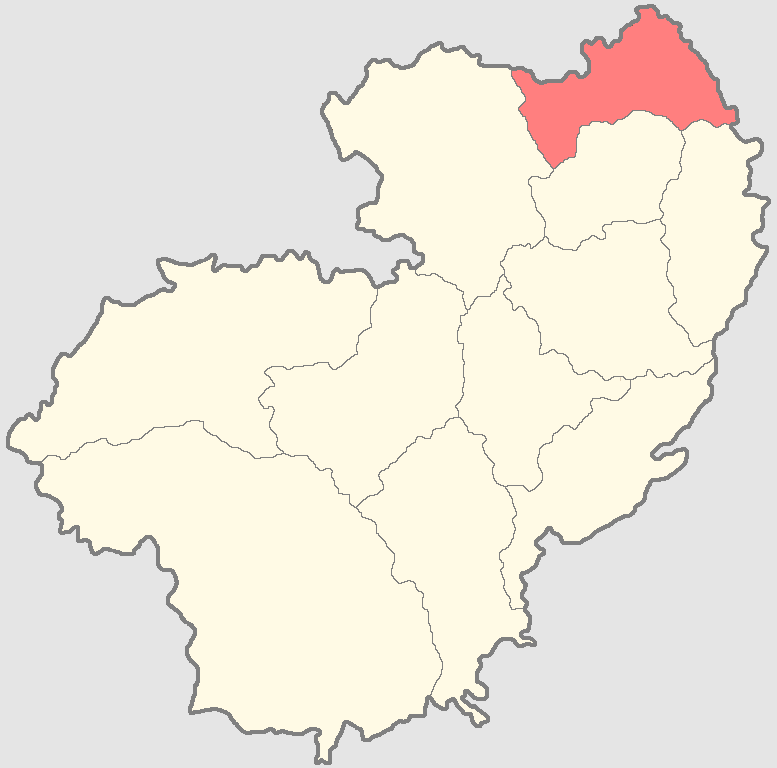
Borovsky Uyezd

Borovsky Uyezd (Бо́ровский уе́зд) was one of the subdivisions of the Kaluga Governorate of the Russian Empire. It was situated in the northeastern part of the governorate. Its administrative centre was Borovsk.

== Demographics ==
At the time of the Russian Empire Census of 1897, Borovsky Uyezd had a population of 53,291. Of these, 99.9% spoke Russian and 0.1% Yiddish as their native language.
