= Kaluzhsky Uyezd =

Kaluzhsky Uyezd (Калу́жский уе́зд) was one of the subdivisions of the Kaluga Governorate of the Russian Empire. It was situated in the northeastern part of the governorate. Its administrative centre was Kaluga.

== Demographics ==
At the time of the Russian Empire Census of 1897, Kaluzhsky Uyezd had a population of 115,321. Of these, 96.5% spoke Russian, 1.3% Polish, 1.1% Ukrainian, 0.6% Yiddish and 0.2% German as their native language.
