= Mosalsky Uyezd =

Mosalsky Uyezd (Моса́льский уе́зд ) was one of the subdivisions of the Kaluga Governorate of the Russian Empire. It was situated in the western part of the governorate. Its administrative centre was Mosalsk.

== Demographics ==
At the time of the Russian Empire Census of 1897, Mosalsky Uyezd had a population of 151,928. Of these, 99.7% spoke Russian and 0.2% Yiddish as their native language.
