= Meshchovsky Uyezd =

Meshchovsky Uyezd (Мещо́вский уе́зд) was one of the subdivisions of the Kaluga Governorate of the Russian Empire. It was situated in the central part of the governorate. Its administrative centre was Meshchovsk.

== Demographics ==
At the time of the Russian Empire Census of 1897, Meshchovsky Uyezd had a population of 96,477. Of these, 99.8% spoke Russian and 0.1% Yiddish as their native language.
