= Kaluga Governorate =

1796–1929 unit of Russia

Coordinates: 54.5333°N 36.2667°E

Kaluga Governorate Калужская губерния
- Governorate of the Russian Empire
- 1796–1929
- Coat of arms

- Location in the Russian Empire
- Capital: Kaluga
- Area
  - 1897: 28,993 km^{2} (11,194 sq mi)
- Population
  - 1897: 1,132,843
- History
  - Established: 12 December 1796
  - Disestablished: 1 October 1929
| Preceded by | Succeeded by |
| Kaluga Viceroyalty | Kaluga Oblast |

Kaluga Governorate (Russian: Калужская губерния, romanized: Kaluzhskaya guberniya) was an administrative-territorial unit (guberniya) of the Russian Empire and the Russian SFSR, which existed in 1796–1929. Its capital was Kaluga.

== Administrative division ==
Kaluga Governorate consisted of the following uyezds (administrative centres in parentheses):

- Borovsky Uyezd (Borovsk)
- Zhizdrinsky Uyezd (Zhizdra)
- Kaluzhsky Uyezd (Kaluga)
- Kozelsky Uyezd (Kozelsk)
- Likhvinsky Uyezd (Likhvin)
- Maloyaroslavetsky Uyezd (Maloyaroslavets)
- Medynsky Uyezd (Medyn)
- Meshchovsky Uyezd (Meshchovsk)
- Mosalsky Uyezd (Mosalsk)
- Peremyshlsky Uyezd (Peremyshl)
- Tarussky Uyezd (Tarusa)

== Demographics ==
At the time of the Russian Empire Census of 1897, Kaluga Governorate had a population of 1,132,843. Of these, 99.4% spoke Russian, 0.2% Polish, 0.1% Yiddish, 0.1% Ukrainian, 0.1% Belarusian and 0.1% German as their native language.
