= Orthodox Encyclopedia =

Russian-language encyclopedia of Eastern Orthodox Christianity

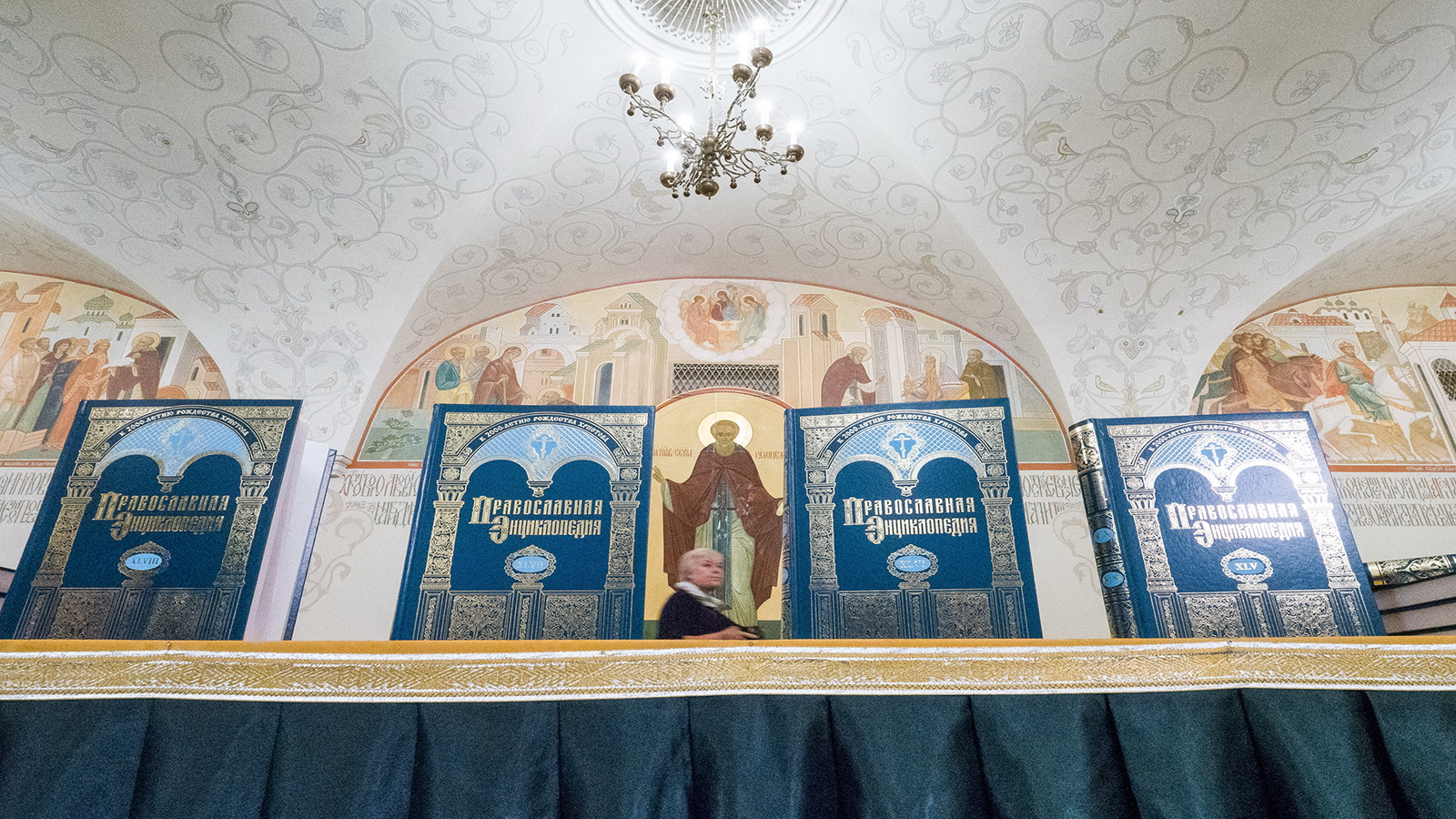

The Orthodox Encyclopedia (Russian: Православная энциклопедия, romanized: Pravoslavnaya entsiklopediya) is a specialized encyclopedia, published by the Church Research Center "Orthodox Encyclopedia" under the general editorship of the Patriarch of Moscow and all Rus' since 2000. As of December 2025, all 75 alphabetical volumes has been released.

The stated objectives of the publication are:

- Provide comprehensive information on the two thousand years of history and the present state of Eastern Orthodoxy;
- Acquaint the reader with the other Christian confessions, non-Christian religions, as well as the phenomena of: science, culture, philosophy, art and politics related to religion.

== History ==
=== 1990s ===
At the end of 1990, on the initiative of hegumen Andronik (Trubachov), the publishing house of the Valaam Monastery was established in Moscow. In February 1991, Patriarch Alexy II of Moscow issued a decree on the establishment of the Valaam Publishing House, which consolidated its legal status. From the very beginning of its activity, the publishing house has been publishing serious scientific and historical works. Monuments of early Christian and Old Russian literature were published, classic works of pre-revolutionary church scientists, which had to be returned to the reader of the end of the XX century. In 1993, it was decided to publish a fundamental "History of the Russian Church" based on the famous work of Metropolitan Macarius (Bulgakov) for the 850^{th} anniversary of Moscow, supplementing it with voluminous scientific commentaries, prefaces and indexes. As the publication of the History of the Russian Church approached its conclusion, the question arose of how to preserve a team of secular and ecclesiastical scientists numbering about twenty people, who had proven themselves well in terms of research activities. According to Sergei Kravets [ru], "a new task arose for them by itself: already since the middle of the XIX century, the Orthodox Church, and not only the Russian Church, but all Local Orthodox Churches, had a grandiose, but never achieved goal – the creation of a fundamental body of knowledge in the form of the "Orthodox Encyclopedia""

10 October 1996, the Holy Synod of the Russian Orthodox Church approved the edition of 25-volume Orthodox Encyclopedia. To implement the project, the following were formed: Supervisory, Trustees, Church-scientific and editorial boards, as well as the Association of philanthropists.

Sergey Kravets stated: "the basic parameters of the upcoming work on the Orthodox Encyclopedia were identified in 1997. From the very beginning the Encyclopedia planned to tackle issue that look far beyond the scope of the Orthodox world: it had to be presented basic information on all Christian denominations and other religions, significant material from the fields of philosophy, morality, ethics, art, music. The edition was to be not only an encyclopedia of the Orthodoxy, but as an encyclopedia of the Orthodox view on the human spirit world, on all human spheres of life".

On 19 February 1998, the first meeting of the Scientific and editorial board for publication of the 25-volume Orthodox Encyclopedia was held under the chairmanship of Patriarch Alexy II in the Throne Room of the Synodal residence in Danilov Monastery. The Scientific Editorial Board approved the thematic division of the Encyclopedia and determined the time of its creation, based on the need to release the first volume on the 2,000^{th} anniversary of the birth of Christ. In addition, it approved the need of interacting with the ecclesiastical and secular academic institutions, the dioceses of the Russian Orthodox Church, as well as with the other local churches. President Boris Yeltsin took the publication under his patronage.

Initially, the authors hoped to rely on the unfinished Orthodox Theological Encyclopedia (1900–1911) by Alexander Lopukhin and Nikolai Glubokovsky, as on well as the Greek Orthodox Encyclopedia "Θρησκευτική και Ηθική Εγκυκλοπαίδεια". But, during the work on glossary, it became clear that the information in the Orthodox Theological Encyclopedia, despite their high scientific value, were outdated, and that information in the Greek encyclopedia was so narrow, national in character that could not be used as the main source for the creation of the conceived common the Orthodox Encyclopedia set.

The entire year 1999 was spent on the preparation of the first, non-alphabetic volume of "Русская православная церковь" ("Russian Orthodox Church"), and the completion of the glossary. In total, 25 volumes were originally planned for publication (including non-alphabetical one), and the project was expected to be completed by 2012.

=== 2000s ===
In the year of the 2,000^{th} anniversary of the Nativity of Christ, a non-alphabetical volume of the encyclopedia dedicated to the Russian Orthodox Church was published. Its presentation took place on May 6 in the Cathedral of Christ the Savior. On November 23, in the Church of St. Nicholas in Tolmachi, Patriarch Alexy II celebrated a thanksgiving prayer on the occasion of the publication of the first alphabetical volume of the encyclopedia.

On March 16, 2001, by the decree of Patriarch Alexy II, the Public Council for the support of the Orthodox Encyclopedia was established, and its first meeting was held on the same day.

On September 12, 2001, the presentation of the second alphabetical volume of the Orthodox Encyclopedia took place in the building of the State Museum of the History of Religion in St. Petersburg.

On May 14, 2002, the presentation of the third volume of the Orthodox Encyclopedia took place in the assembly hall of the Moscow Theological Academy.

On October 1, 2003, in the Cathedral of Christ the Saviour, a joint meeting of the Supervisory, Trustee and Public Councils for the publication of the Orthodox Encyclopedia was held. On the same day, the presentation of the IV, V and VI volumes of the Orthodox Encyclopedia took place.

On May 12, 2004, the 10^{th} anniversary meeting of the public Supervisory and Board of Trustees for the publication of the encyclopedia and the presentation of the 7^{th} volume took place. Patriarch Alexy II announced that the number of volumes will increase by five to six books and reach 30 volumes

On November 30, 2004, in the Cathedral of Christ the Savior, the 11^{th} meeting of the Public, Supervisory and Trustee Councils for the publication of the Orthodox Encyclopedia and the presentation of Volume VIII took place.

On May 31, 2005, in the Cathedral of Christ the Savior, the 12^{th} meeting of the Public, Supervisory and Trustee Councils for the publication of the Orthodox Encyclopedia and the presentation of Volume IX took place.

On November 15, 2005, Patriarch Alexy II of Moscow led the presentation of the X volume of the Orthodox Encyclopedia at the Military Academy of the General Staff of the Armed Forces of the Russian Federation.

On November 29, 2005, the 13^{th} meeting of the Public, Supervisory and Trustee Councils for the publication of the Orthodox Encyclopedia was held, at which Patriarch Alexy II noted the need "next year to increase the pace of scientific and editorial work in order to release not 2, but 3 volumes during the year". The one and a half times increase in the burden on the authors required drastic measures. In March 2006, Patriarch Alexy II sent circular letters to all the theological academies of the Russian Orthodox Church with a proposal to discuss at academic councils the need for a sharp intensification of participation in the work on the publication of the Orthodox Encyclopedia. The Patriarch suggested that the theological academies include the topics of future articles of the Orthodox Encyclopedia in the list of topics for writing theses and candidate's works. It was also decided on the possibility of considering large blocks of articles of the Orthodox Encyclopedia as scientific works when awarding an academic title.

On June 6, 2006, the 14^{th} joint meeting of the Public, Supervisory and Trustee Councils for the publication of the "Orthodox Encyclopedia" and the XI alphabetical volume of the Orthodox Encyclopedia was held in the Cathedral of Christ the Savior.

On November 7, 2006, in the Cathedral of Christ the Saviour, the 15^{th} joint meeting of the Supervisory, Trustee and Public Councils for the publication of the Orthodox Encyclopedia and the presentation of the XII alphabetical volume of the Orthodox Encyclopedia took place.

On March 2, 2007, in the Cathedral of Christ the Saviour, Patriarch Alexy II of Moscow led the presentation of the XIII alphabetical volume of the Orthodox Encyclopedia.

On November 1, 2007, the 17^{th} joint meeting of the Supervisory, Trustee and Public Councils for the publication of the Orthodox Encyclopedia was held in the Cathedral of Christ the Savior. The XIV and XV alphabetical volumes of the Orthodox Encyclopedia were presented.

On March 19, 2008, the 18^{th} joint meeting of the Supervisory, Trustee and Public Councils for the publication of the Orthodox Encyclopedia was held in the Cathedral of Christ the Savior. The meeting was attended by the elected President of Russia Dmitry Medvedev. The XVI volume was presented.

On October 21, 2008, the 19^{th} joint meeting of the Supervisory, Trustee and Public Councils for the publication of the Orthodox Encyclopedia and the presentation of the next alphabetical volumes XVII and XVIII took place in the Cathedral of Christ the Savior. By that time, it was assumed that the total volume of the publication would be 3,000 author's sheets, and the encyclopedia would include more than 70,000 articles in 30 volumes. It was planned to complete the publication of the "Orthodox Encyclopedia" in 2015.

In December 2008, Patriarch Alexy II died. On March 18, 2009, under the chairmanship of the newly elected Patriarch Kirill, the 20^{th} joint meeting of the public, supervisory and trustee councils for the publication of the Orthodox Encyclopedia was held, at which it was announced that the publication of the encyclopedia would continue, despite economic difficulties., the XIX volume was presented On March 31 of the same year, the Holy Synod, at its first meeting after the enthronement of Patriarch Kirill, decided: "To draw the attention of the Right Reverend bishops, heads of educational institutions of the Russian Orthodox Church to the need to purchase an "Orthodox Encyclopedia" for diocesan, parish and monastery libraries, as well as for libraries of educational institutions".

On November 5, 2009, the Patriarchal Chambers of the Cathedral of Christ the Saviour hosted the 21^{st} joint meeting of the Supervisory, Trustee and Public Councils for the publication of the Orthodox Encyclopedia and the presentation of the next alphabetical 20^{th} and 21^{st} volumes.

=== 2010s ===
On April 29, 2010, the 22^{nd} meeting of the Supervisory, Public and Trustee Councils for the publication of the Orthodox Encyclopedia and the presentation of the 22^{nd} alphabetical volume of the encyclopedia took place in the Cathedral of Christ the Savior.

On November 24, 2010, in the Sergiev Hall of the Cathedral of Christ the Saviour, the 23^{rd} joint meeting of the Supervisory, Trustee and Public Councils for the publication of the Orthodox Encyclopedia and the presentation of the 23^{rd} and 24^{th} alphabetical volumes of the Orthodox Encyclopedia took place.

On November 11, 2011, in the Cathedral of Christ the Savior the 24^{th} meeting of the Supervisory, Public and Trustee Councils for the publication of the Orthodox Encyclopedia and the presentation of the XXV, XXVI and XXVII alphabetical volumes of the encyclopedia took place.

On February 28, 2013, the 25^{th} meeting of the Supervisory, Public and Trustee Councils for the publication of the Orthodox Encyclopedia and the presentation of the 28^{th}, 29^{th} and 30^{th} alphabetical volumes of the Orthodox Encyclopedia took place in the Sergiev Hall of the Cathedral of Christ the Saviour.

On February 25, 2014, the 26^{th} joint meeting of the supervisory, public and trustee councils and the presentation of the 31-33 volumes of the encyclopedia took place in the Sergiev Hall of the Cathedral of Christ the Savior in Moscow. A "very important and extremely difficult decision was made to switch to the release of four volumes per year".

On March 11, 2015, the 27^{th} joint meeting of the Supervisory, Public and Trustee Councils for the publication of the Orthodox Encyclopedia was held in the Sergiev Hall of the Cathedral of Christ the Savior in Moscow. Patriarch Kirill announced that 55 volumes are planned for publication.

On March 24, 2016, the 28^{th} joint meeting of the Supervisory, Public and Trustee Councils for the publication of the Orthodox Encyclopedia was held in the Sergiev Hall of the Cathedral of Christ the Savior in Moscow. Patriarch Kirill presented volumes 37–40, noting that the publication had overcome the "fatal line" – the letter К, at which the publication of the pre-revolutionary "Orthodox Theological Encyclopedia" stopped.

On April 6, 2017, the St. Sergius Hall of the Refectory Chambers of the Cathedral of Christ the Saviour hosted the 29^{th} joint meeting of the Supervisory, Public and Board of Trustees for the publication of the Orthodox Encyclopedia and the presentation of the 41-44 volumes published in 2016, as well as the 45^{th} volume released in 2017. Patriarch Kirill noted that this is the first time that five volumes were presented at once.

On June 6, 2018, the 30^{th} meeting of the supervisory, public and trustee Councils for the publication of the Orthodox Encyclopedia was held. The 45-48 alphabetic volumes were presented.

On March 19, 2019, the 31^{st} joint meeting of the Supervisory, Public and Trustee Councils for the publication of the Orthodox Encyclopedia and the presentation of the 49-52 new alphabetical volumes of the encyclopedia took place at the Cathedral of Christ the Savior in Moscow.

=== 2020s ===
On March 28, 2023, after a long break, the 32^{nd} joint meeting of the Supervisory, Public and Trustee Councils for the publication of the Orthodox Encyclopedia took place in the Cathedral of Christ the Savior in Moscow. 53-68 alphabetical volumes of the Orthodox Encyclopedia were presented.

On October 29, 2024, the 33^{rd} joint meeting of the Supervisory, Public and Board of Trustees for the publication of the Orthodox Encyclopedia was held at the Cathedral of Christ the Savior in Moscow. For the first time, the meeting was headed not by the Patriarch, but by the Patriarchal Vicar of the Metropolitanate of Moscow, Metropolitan Paul (Ponomaryov) of Krutitsy and Kolomna. 68-73 alphabetical volumes of the Orthodox Encyclopedia were presented.

On December 5, 2025, the Publishing House of the Moscow Patriarchate announced the sale of the last, 75^{th}, volume of the Orthodox Encyclopedia.
