= Sudakov =

Sudakov (Russian: Судаков) is a Russian surname. The feminine form is Sudakova (Russian: Судакова). Notable people with the surname include:

- Barsanuphius Sudakov (born 1955), Russian bishop of the Russian Orthodox Church
- Benny Sudakov (born 1969), Soviet-born Israeli mathematician
- Heorhiy Sudakov (born 2002), Ukrainian footballer
- Marina Sudakova (born 1989), Russian former handball player
- Oleg Sudakov (born 1962), Russian musician, poet, artist, and publicist
- Yuri Sudakov (1948–2025), Russian boxer and boxing coach

== See also ==
- Sudakovo, a rural locality in the Russian Vologda Oblast
