= Gregory Petrov =

Metropolitan of Voskresensk

- Chancellor of the Moscow Patriarchate
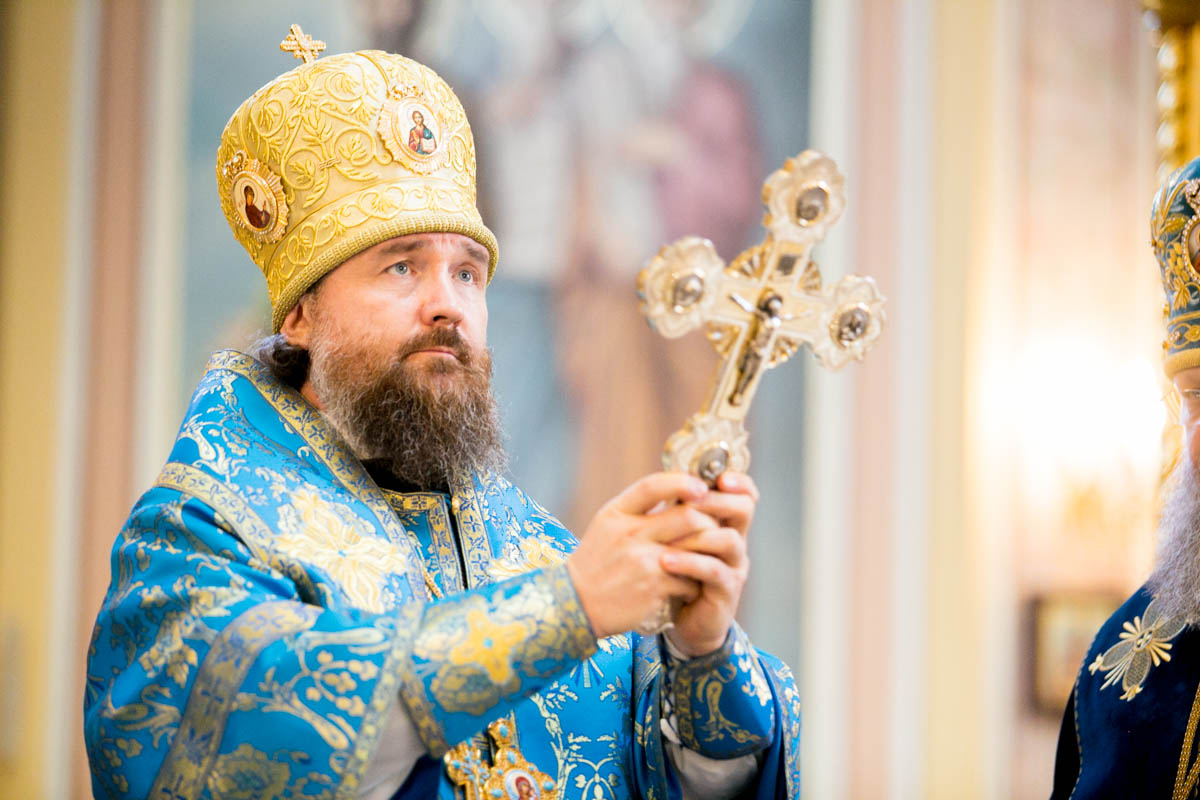
- Church: Russian Orthodox Church
- In office: 23 October 2023
- Predecessor: Dionysius Porubay

Personal details
- Born: Andrey Vladimirovich Petrov; 26 December 1974 (age 51) Lyubim, Yaroslavl Oblast
- Education: Yaroslavl State University; Moscow Theological Seminary; Moscow Theological Academy

Metropolitan Gregory (Russian: Митрополит Григорий, secular name Andrey Vladimirovich Petrov, Russian: Андрей Владимирович Петров); born 26 December 1974 in Lyubim, Yaroslavl Oblast) is a bishop of the Russian Orthodox Church. Titular metropolitan of Voskresensk, first vicar of the Patriarch of Moscow and all Rus' for the city of Moscow. Chancellor of the Moscow Patriarchate (since 2023), permanent member of the Holy Synod of the Russian Orthodox Church and its secretary.

== Biography ==
He was baptized in infancy. From childhood he served at the altar and sang in the choir of the Presentation of Mary Church in Lyubim.

In 1992, after graduating from high school, he entered the physics department of Yaroslavl State University. He combined his studies at the university with performing his duties as a psalm-reader at the Holy Cross Church in the city of Yaroslavl.

After graduating from the university in 1997, he entered the Moscow Theological Seminary. After completing his studies at the seminary in 2000, he entered the Moscow Theological Academy, from which he graduated in June 2004 with a candidate of theology degree for the thesis “The Epistle to the Colossians of the Holy Apostle Paul in Russian Biblical Studies.” The Educational Committee of the Russian Orthodox Church was sent to the Diocese of Perm and appointed as a teacher at the Perm Theological College.

On July 11, 2004, Bishop Irenarch (Grezin) of Perm and Solikamsk ordained him a celibate deacon, and on July 12, 2004, he was ordained a priest.

In 2004-2007 he was the head of the office of the Perm diocesan administration.

On November 1, 2006, he was appointed rector of the Church of St. Mitrophan of Voronezh in Perm. On April 28, 2007, he was appointed vice-rector for academic affairs of the Perm Theological College.

In January 2009, he participated in the 2009 convocation of the Local Council of the Russian Orthodox Church.

On May 3, 2009, he was tonsured a monk with the name Gregory in honor of St. Gregory Palamas.

In March 2010, he was released from obedience in the Diocese of Perm, added to the staff and left for Moscow to carry out church obedience in the newly formed Synodal Department for Prison Ministry, which was headed by Bishop Irenarch (Grezin), who became Bishop of Krasnogorsk, vicar of the Patriarch of Moscow and all Rus'.

On July 26, 2010, by decision of the Holy Synod, he was appointed deputy chairman of the Synodal Department for Prison Ministry.

In June 2011, he completed a two-year advanced training course at the All-Church Postgraduate and Doctoral Studies.

On October 5, 2011, by decision of the Holy Synod, he was released from the post of deputy chairman of the Synodal Department for Prison Ministry and placed at the disposal of the Patriarch of Moscow and All Rus'.

On December 20, 2011, by order of Patriarch Kirill, he was appointed assistant to the head of the Administrative Secretariat of the Moscow Patriarchate.

On May 10, 2012, by decree of Patriarch Kirill, he was appointed full-time priest of the Church of the Life-Giving Trinity, Patriarchal Metochion in Ostankino, Moscow.

On December 26, 2013, by decision of the Holy Synod, he was elected Bishop of Troistk and Yuzhnouralsk. On January 9, 2014, in the Church of All Saints, the Patriarchal and Synodal Residence in Danilov Monastery, Metropolitan Barsanuphius Sudakov of Saransk and Mordovia, he was elevated to the rank of archimandrite. On January 24, 2014, in the Church of All Saints, those who shone in the Russian land, the Patriarchal residence in the Danilov Monastery in Moscow, he was nominated bishop. On March 16, 2014, in the Church of the Nativity of the Blessed Virgin Mary in Krylatskoye, the consecration of Archimandrite Gregory (Petrov) as Bishop of Troitsk and Yuzhnouralsk was performed, which was performed by: Patriarch Kirill, Metropolitan Barsanuphius (Sudakov) of Saransk and Mordovia, Metropolitan Arsenius (Yepifanov) of Istra, Metropolitan Kirill (Nakonechny) of Yekaterinburg and Verkhoturye, Metropolitan Theophan (Ashurkov) of Chelyabinsk and Zlatoust, Bishop Ignatius (Punin) of Vyborg and Priozersk, Bishop Sergius (Chashin) of Solnechnogorsk, Bishop Benjamin (Likhomanov) of Rybinsk and Uglich, Bishop Innocent (Vasetsky) of Magnitogorsk and Verkhneuralsk.

From November 17 to 28, 2014, in Moscow, he attended two-week advanced training courses for newly installed bishops of the Russian Orthodox Church.

On December 28, 2018, by decision of the Holy Synod, he was appointed Bishop of Chelyabinsk and Miass, head of the Metropolinate of Chelyabinsk, with the assignment of temporary management of the Diocese of Troitsk.

On January 3, 2019, in the Dormition Cathedral in the Moscow Kremlin, Patriarch Kirill elevated him to the rank of metropolitan.

On April 15, 2021, he was appointed Metropolitan of Yekaterinodar and Kuban, head of the Metropolitanate of Kuban.

In 2022, he supported Russian invasion of Ukraine. In July 2022, as having “supported Russia’s aggression against Ukraine,” the FBK was added to the list of warmongers, consisting of individuals who “use their religious organizations to promote aggression and mass murder,” with a proposal to impose international sanctions against him.

On October 11, 2023, by decision of the Holy Synod of the Russian Orthodox Church, he was appointed Chancellor of the Moscow Patriarchate and Permanent Member of the Holy Synod of the Russian Orthodox Church with the title “of Voskresensk”, first vicar of the Patriarch of Moscow and All Rus' for the city of Moscow and manager of the Central Vicariate of the Diocese of Moscow city, secretary of the Inter-Council Presence, chairman of the General Church the disciplinary commission under the Patriarch of Moscow and All Rus', the chairman of the Interdepartmental Working Group for coordinating assistance provided to the dioceses of Donbass and adjacent territories located in the conflict zone, and the abbot of the Novospassky Monastery with his release from the management of the Diocese of Yekaterinodar and the Metropolitanate of Kuban and an expression of gratitude for the work incurred.
