= Barsanuphius Sudakov =

Metropolitan of St. Petersburg and Ladoga, Russia

- Metropolitan Barsanuphius of Saint Petersburg and Ladoga
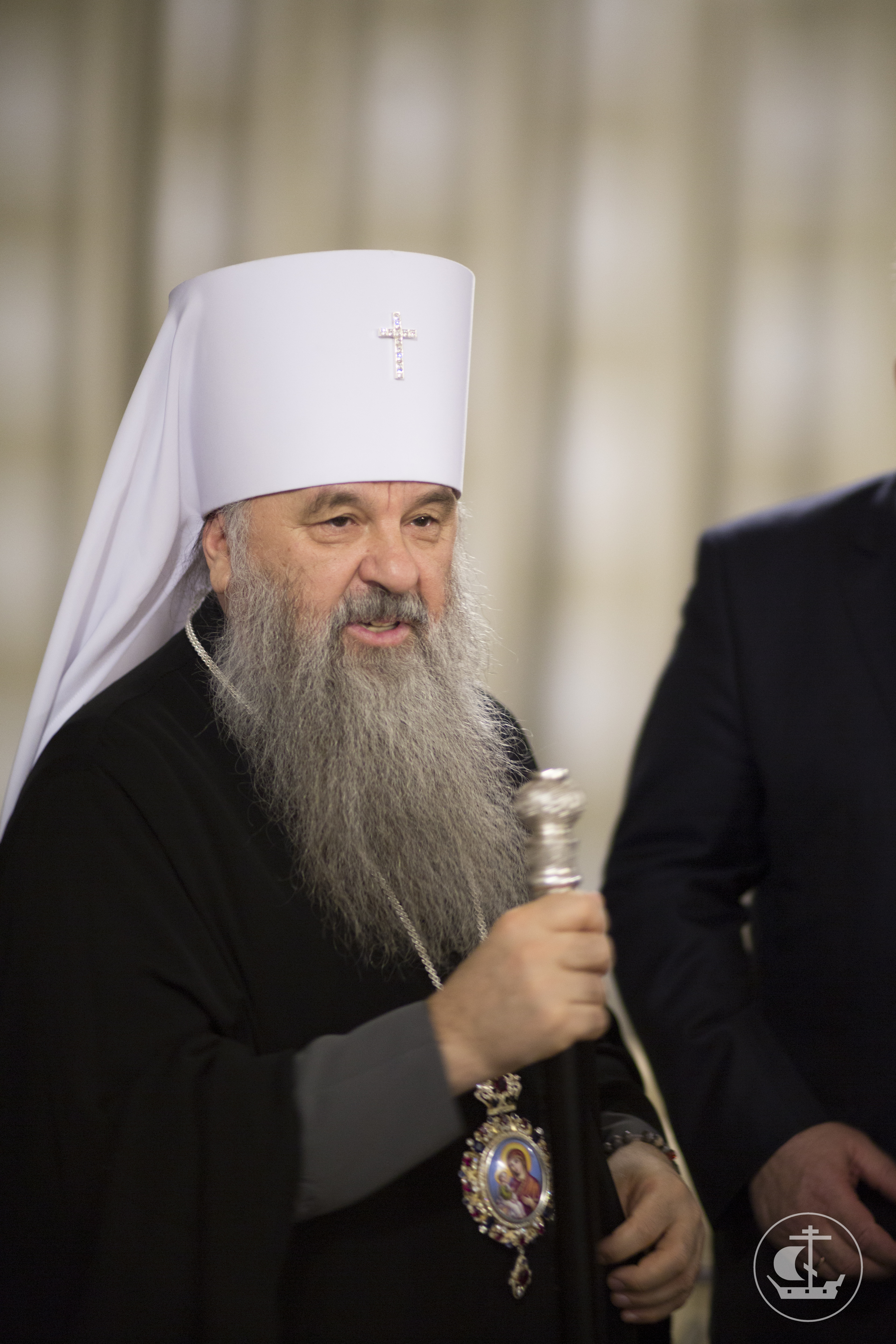
- Native name: Анато́лий Влади́мирович Судако́в
- Church: Russian Orthodox Church
- Metropolis: Metropolitan of St. Petersburg and Ladoga
- In office: 19 March 2014
- Predecessor: Vladimir (Kotlyarov)

Personal details
- Born: Anatoly Vladimirovich Sudakov; 3 June 1955 (age 71) Malinovka, Arkadaksky District, Saratov Oblast
- Education: Moscow Theological Seminary

Metropolitan Barsanuphius (Russian: Митрополит Варсонофий, secular name Anatoly Vladimirovich Sudakov, Russian: Анато́лий Влади́мирович Судако́в; 3 June 1955, Malinovka, Arkadaksky District, Saratov Oblast) is a bishop of the Russian Orthodox Church who is serving as the Metropolitan of St. Petersburg and Ladoga, head of the Metropolitanate of St. Petersburg. Permanent member of the Holy Synod of the Russian Orthodox Church since March 31, 2009. His name day is April 11 (24) (of St. Barsanuphius, Bishop of Tver).

== Biography ==
Born on June 3, 1955, in a large (6 children) peasant family to Vladimir Sudakov and Antonina Leontievna Sudakova-Pozorova. He received his initial religious education from her.

After graduating from Malinovka secondary school in 1972, he worked for a year in his village as a postman and at a brick factory. In the fall of 1973, he was drafted into the Soviet Armed Forces and sent to the Group of Soviet Forces in Germany, where he served as a tank driver in units in Brandenburg and Potsdam.

In November 1975, after being transferred to the reserve, he got a job as an altar boy at the St. Michael the Archangel Cathedral in the city of Serdobsk, Penza Oblast. On the advice of the rector of the cathedral, Archimandrite Modest (Kozhevnikov), he decided to receive spiritual education and take the path of monasticism.

In 1976, he submitted a petition to the Moscow Theological Seminary. Already in the seminary, he finally decided to connect his fate with monasticism and in October 1977 he was accepted as a novice into the brotherhood of the Trinity-Sergius Lavra.

On March 30, 1978, the abbot of the Lavra, Archimandrite Jerome (Zinoviev), tonsured him a monk with the name Barsanuphius in honor of St. Barsanuphius, Bishop of Tver.

On April 27, 1978, Archbishop Vladimir Sabodan of Dmitrov ordained him to the rank of hierodeacon, and on November 26 of the same year, he ordained him a hieromonk. After that, until 1982, he served as an assistant sacristan.

In 1979, he graduated from the Moscow Theological Seminary in three years (instead of four).

While on obedience at the Trinity-Sergius Lavra, hegumen Barsanuphius had a close friendship with the confessors of the monastery, Archimandrites Cyril (Pavlov) and Nahum (Bayborodin). His immediate spiritual superiors were the sacristan Archimandrite Aristarchus Stankevich; dean, and then viceroy, Archimandrite Eusebius (Savvin); Dean Archimandrite Mark (Petrovtsy).

In 1982 he was elevated to the rank of abbot and until 1986 he served as assistant dean.

In 1982 he entered the Moscow Theological Academy.

While studying at Moscow theological schools, Abbot Barsanuphius spent his vacation time annually at the Pühtitsa Convent in Estonia. Here he had to serve Metropolitan Alexy (Ridiger) of Tallinn and Estonia more than once and receive spiritual edification from Abbess Barbara (Trofimova), the long-term abbess of the monastery, and from the sisters of this monastery.

In 1986 he graduated from the Moscow Theological Academy with the defense of his dissertation “Athos - the Great Treasury of Orthodoxy” for the degree of candidate of theology. The head of the scientific work was Archimandrite Innocent (Prosvirnin).

According to his recollections:

After graduating from the Moscow Theological Academy, at the invitation of Archbishop Seraphim of Penza and Saransk, I came to Saransk to help him prepare for the celebration of the 1000th anniversary of the Baptism of Rus'

.

From September 15, 1986, to June 15, 1988, he was rector of the Kazan Church in the city of Kuznetsk, Penza Oblast. In 1987 he was elevated to the rank of archimandrite.

From June 15, 1988, to February 7, 1991, he served as rector of the Assumption Cathedral of Penza, secretary of the Penza diocesan administration. While obedient to the bishop, later Archbishop of Penza Seraphim (Tikhonov), he received many edifying lessons from him in performing divine services, in clerical work, and in administrative activities.

He participated in Local Councils of the Russian Orthodox Church in which were held in 1988 and 1990.

On January 29, 1991, by decision of the Holy Synod of the Russian Orthodox Church, the Diocese of Saransk was formed by separating it from the Diocese of Penza, to which Archimandrite Barsanuphius was appointed.

On February 8, 1991, in the Moscow Epiphany Cathedral, he was consecrated Bishop of Saransk and Mordovia. The consecration was performed by Patriarch Alexy II of Moscow and All Rus', co-served by sixteen bishops. On February 15 of the same year he arrived in Saransk.

He was aware of the affairs in Mordovia well, since in his position as secretary of the Penza diocesan administration he often visited Saransk and the churches of the republic, and had a concrete idea of the economic, political and cultural state of the parishes. Under his leadership, with the help of well-wishers of the Church, more than 200 new parishes and 14 monasteries, the Saransk Theological School were opened, a diocesan press was founded, etc.

In 2000, after the death of Archbishop of Penza and Kuznetsk Seraphim (Tikhonov), he temporarily ruled the Diocese of Penza (until the appointment of Philaret (Karagodin)).

On February 22, 2001, he was elevated to the rank of archbishop.

On March 31, 2009, by decision of the Holy Synod of the Russian Orthodox Church, he was appointed acting Chancellor of the Moscow Patriarchate.

On May 27, 2009, by decision of the Holy Synod of the Russian Orthodox Church, he was appointed chairman of the newly formed award commission under the Patriarch of Moscow and All Rus'.

On July 27, 2009, by decision of the Holy Synod of the Russian Orthodox Church, it was included in the Inter-Council Presence of the Russian Orthodox Church.

On December 25, 2009, he was confirmed as the Chancellor of the Moscow Patriarchate, permanent member and secretary of the Holy Synod of the Russian Orthodox Church.

On February 1, 2010, in the Cathedral of Christ the Savior, “in consideration of the diligent service of the Church of God and in connection with his appointment as the Chancellor of the Moscow Patriarchate,” he was elevated to the rank of metropolitan.

He initiated the creation of two new dioceses on the territory of Mordovia:

To effectively manage a diocese, it should not have more than 150 parishes...By dividing Mordovia into three dioceses, we will solve our main problems. The new bishops will be able to work more consistently and carefully with the parishes.

On May 30, 2011, Holy Synod of the Russian Orthodox Church formed diocese the Ardatov and diocese of Krasnoslobodsk, which were separated from diocese of Saransk. At the same time, he was appointed temporary manager of the diocese of Ardatov, which he ruled until October 14, 2011. On October 6, 2011, he was appointed head of the newly formed Metropolitanate of Mordovia.

In 2013, he was relieved of his position as chairman of the awards commission under the Patriarch of Moscow and All Rus'.

On March 19, 2014, by decision of the Holy Synod the Russian Orthodox Church, he was determined to be the Metropolitan of St. Petersburg and Ladoga, the head of the Metropolitanate of St. Petersburg, with the temporary retention of the post of the Chancellor of the Moscow Patriarchate. A considerable number of priests from his previous place of ministry came to St. Petersburg with him. The discussion on this topic, which took place within the diocese, spilled into the public space in 2015 with the light hand of the then head of St. Isaac's Cathedral, Nikolai Burov.

He believed that there were not enough churches in St. Petersburg: while still Metropolitan of Mordovia, he said that the most appropriate figure was one church per thousand inhabitants, while in St. Petersburg “4 thousand people per church, and this is one of the worst indicators in the country". Therefore, new ones are being built under him, and there is a constant process of reclaiming former church premises. In 2014, at the time of appointment to St. Petersburg, the diocese had 198 parishes and 661 clergy; by February 2019, there were 271 parishes and 814 clergy.

In 2015, he actively promoted the idea of transferring St. Isaac's Cathedral to the Russian Orthodox Church, and repeatedly sent letters to the Governor of Saint Petersburg, Georgy Poltavchenko and Prime Minister Dmitry Medvedev. He encountered opposition from the St. Petersburg public on this issue.

At the beginning of September 2018, against the backdrop of a general deterioration in Russian-Greek relations, it was reported that he was denied a visa for a pilgrimage trip to Greece, to Mount Athos.

On February 26, 2019, the Holy Synod granted the request of Metropolitan Barsanuphius to be relieved of his post as the Chancellor of the Moscow Patriarchate. According to Metropolitan Hilarion Alfeyev: "since he took the Diocese of Saint Petersburg, he had to work for two cities: he spent half the week in St. Petersburg, half the week in Moscow. This constant travel by plane or Sapsan, of course, was extremely tiring for the bishop. Therefore, he asked the Patriarch to relieve him from his post as the Chancellor".

On July 9 of the same year, he was also relieved of his duties as Secretary of the Inter-Council Presence.
