= Grigory Petrov =

Grigory Petrov (Russian: Григорий Петров) may refer to the following notable people:

- Grigory Petrov (priest) (1866–1925), Russian priest, public figure, and publicist
- Grigory Petrov (cleric) (born 1974) - metropolitan, member of the Holy Synod of the Russian Orthodox Church
- Grigory Petrov (revolutionary) (1892–1918), Russian Socialist-Revolutionary activist
