= Patriarchal and Synodal Residence in Danilov Monastery =

- Патриаршая и синодальная резиденция в Даниловом монастыре
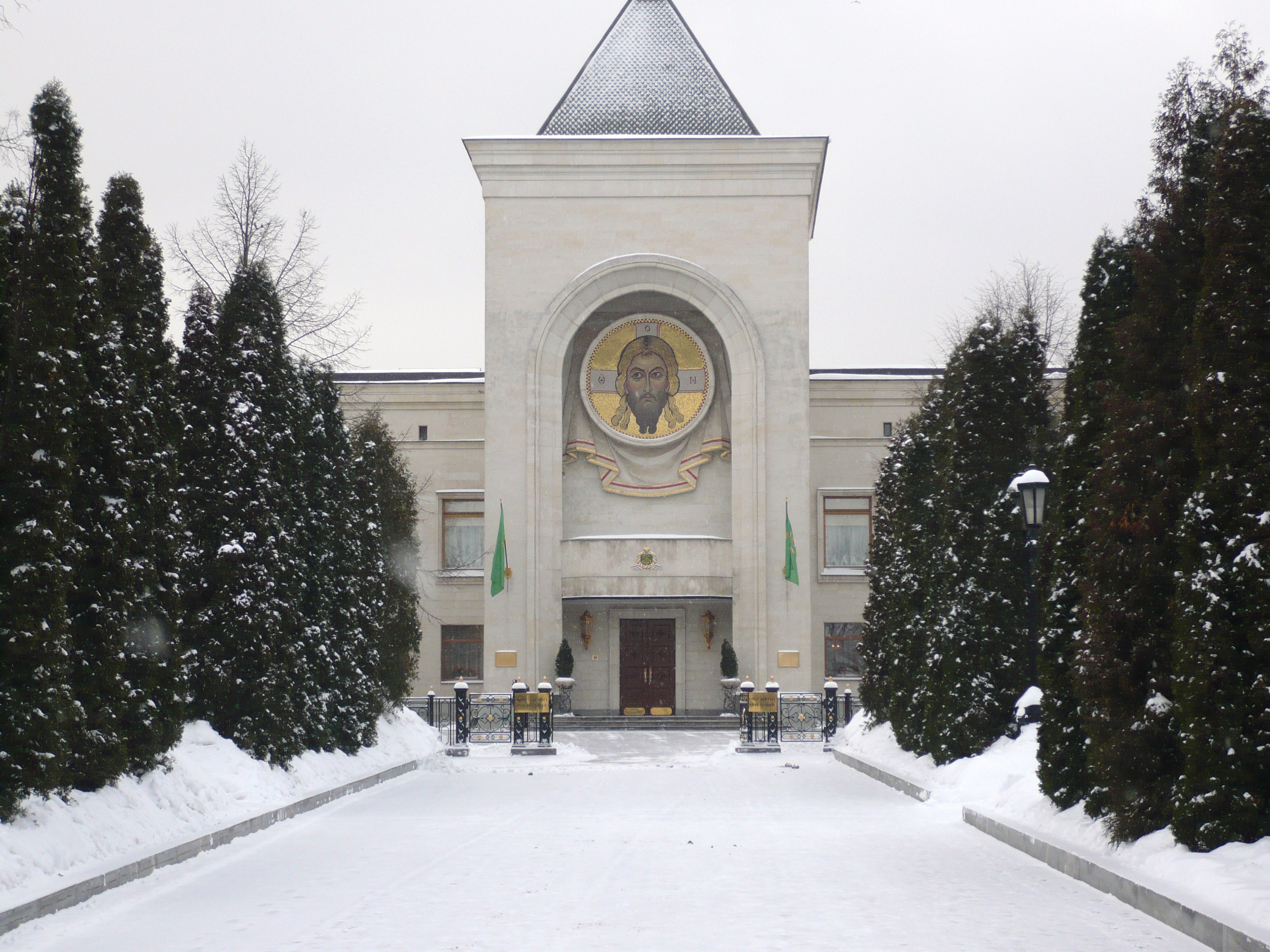
- Interactive map of the Patriarchal and Synodal Residence in Danilov Monastery area

General information
- Type: Residence
- Architectural style: eclectic
- Location: Danilov Monastery, Moscow, Russia
- Coordinates: 55°42′39″N 37°37′40″E
- Construction started: 1985
- Completed: 1988
- Owner: Russian Orthodox Church

Design and construction
- Architect: Yuri Rabayev

The Patriarchal and Synodal residence in Danilov Monastery (Russian: Патриаршая и синодальная резиденция в Даниловом монастыре) is a two-story building located in the western part of the Danilov Monastery in Moscow. On the second floor of the building there is a house church in honor of All Saints who shone in the Russian land. The building is the official residence of the Patriarch of Moscow and all Rus'.

== History ==
In May 1983, Soviet authorities decided to return the Danilov Monastery to the Russian Orthodox Church. The Journal of the Moscow Patriarchate contained material about the visit on May 17 by Patriarch Pimen and those accompanying him to the Chairman of the Council for Religious Affairs under the Council of Ministers of the USSR, Vladimir Kuroyedov. The latter informed the hierarchs that the USSR government had decided to return the Danilov Monastery “to create in it and on the adjacent site the Administrative Center of the Moscow Patriarchate; The construction of new office premises on this territory is also permitted”. According to the plan of Patriarch Pimen, the Patriarchal and Synodal residence, as well as the services of the Moscow Patriarchate, were to be located in the Danilov Monastery

The building project was developed by a team of architects led by Yuri Rabayev from Mosproekt-2 Ivan Vostorgov, combining the style of Soviet architecture of the 1970s-1980s with reinterpretations of the late medieval tradition (the “rest” layout, high roofs). A mosaic was made above the entrance with the image of the Savior made by master E. N. Klyucharyov). The project and its implementation caused very mixed assessments from both experts and ordinary believers. On the second floor of the building, a house church was built in honor of All Saints who shone in the Russian land, consecrated in 1988. In this church, the rite of naming bishops is often performed, and their consecration takes place during the liturgy in the Cathedral of Christ the Savior.

It was here that in early October 1993 negotiations took place between representatives of President Boris Yeltsin and the Supreme Soviet of Russia, conducted through the mediation of the Russian Orthodox Church.

On October 6, 2008, Patriarch of Moscow and all Rus', Alexy II consecrated the new Synodal Chamber, after which he opened the next meeting of the Holy Synod in the restored Synodal Chamber, which was held here for the first time. Patriarch Alexy II noted that this chamber will be used along with other synodal halls - in the Patriarchal Residence in Chisty Lane and in the Cathedral of Christ the Savior.

In 2009, a decision was made to majorly reconstruct the Synodal residence in the Danilov Monastery, which previously hosted official receptions and meetings of the Holy Synod.

On December 27, 2011, before the start of the meeting of the Holy Synod of the Russian Orthodox Church, the consecration of the Synodal residence in the Danilov Monastery took place after its major reconstruction:

the building was completely rebuilt. Only the walls remained, not even the foundation remained, because the building was in a catastrophic situation. Mistakes made during construction, perhaps related to the imperfection of technology at that time, led to the fact that the building began to collapse. So we rebuilt the foundation, resurfaced the entire area around the building, providing the necessary waterproofing, and then moved on to a very deep interior renovation. This building will be the main Synodal residence, as envisioned by its creators back in 1988

.
