= Patriarch Alexy II of Moscow =

15th Patriarch of Moscow and all the Rus', the primate of the Russian Orthodox Church

His Holiness Alexy II
- Patriarch of Moscow and all Rus'
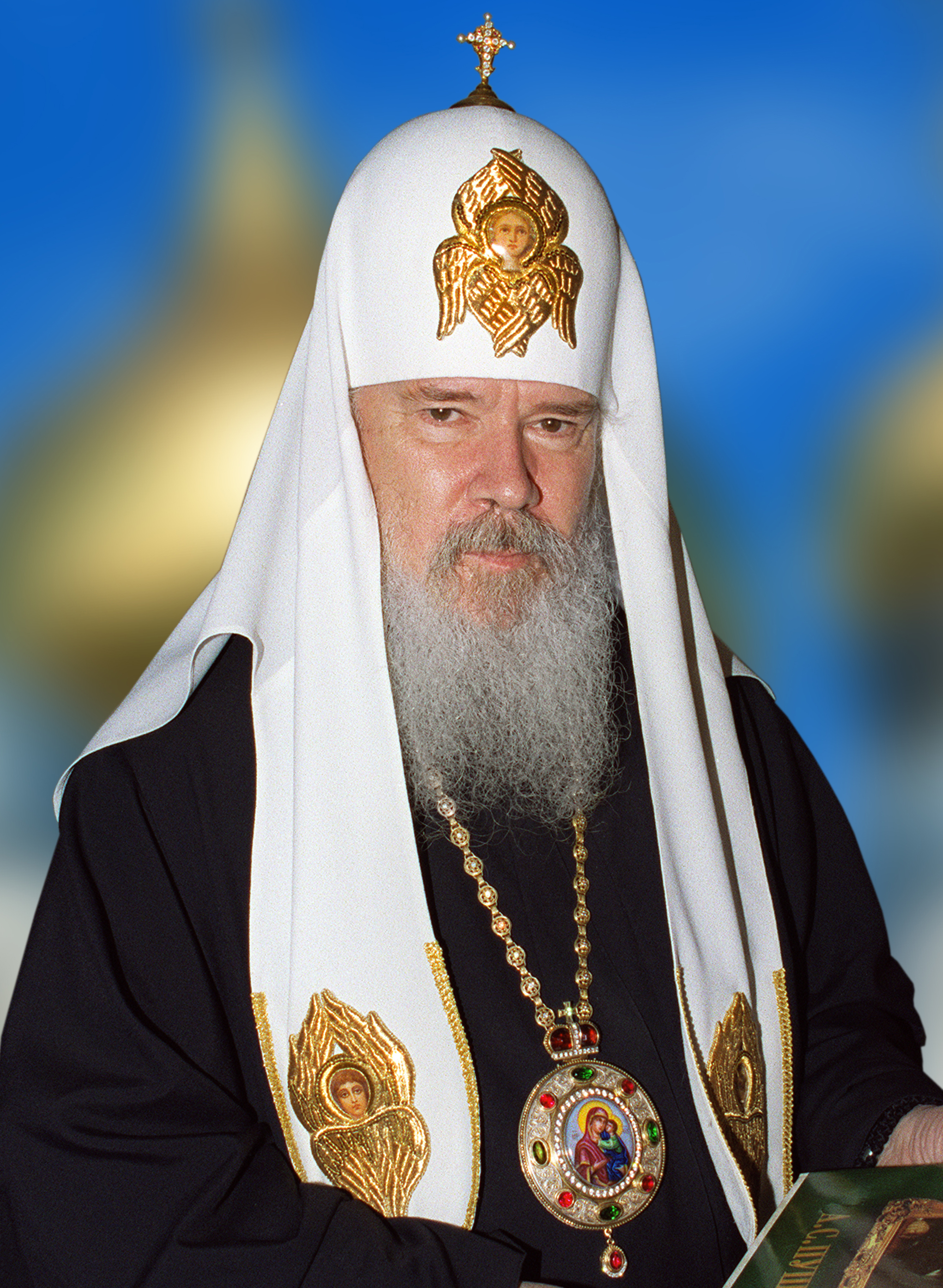
- Alexy II in 1995
- Church: Russian Orthodox Church
- See: Moscow
- Installed: 10 June 1990
- Term ended: 5 December 2008
- Predecessor: Pimen I
- Successor: Kirill

Orders
- Ordination: 17 April 1950
- Consecration: 3 September 1961 by Nikodim of Leningrad

Personal details
- Born: Aleksei Rüdiger; 23 February 1929 Tallinn, Estonia
- Died: 5 December 2008 (aged 79) Peredelkino, Moscow Oblast, Russia
- Buried: Epiphany Cathedral at Elokhovo
- Denomination: Russian Orthodox
- Spouse: Vera Alekseeva (1950–1951)
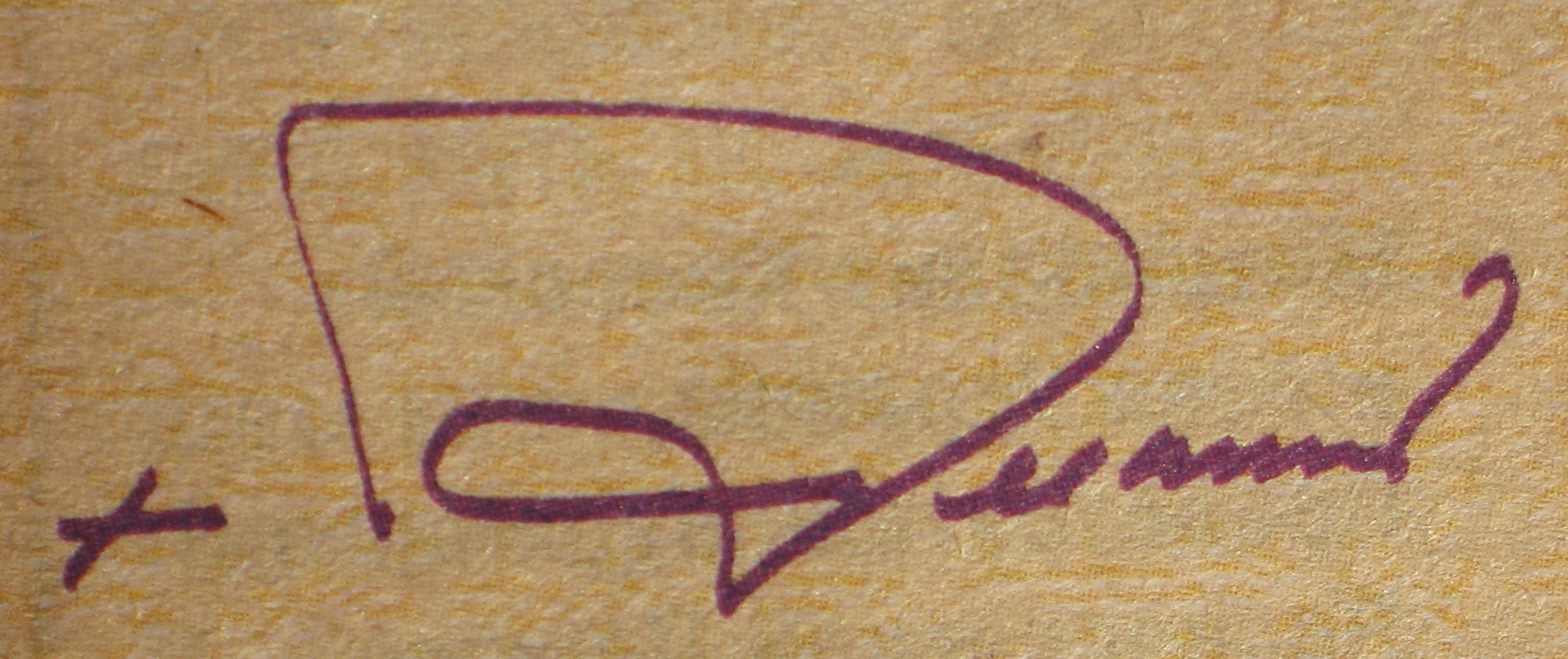
- Signature: Alexy II's signature

- Coat of arms: Alexy II's coat of arms

Patriarch Alexy II (or Alexius II, Russian: Патриарх Алексий II; secular name Aleksei Mikhailovich Ridiger; (Note: In this name that follows East Slavic naming customs, the patronymic is Mikhailovich and the family name is Ridiger.) Russian: Алексей Михайлович Ридигер; 23 February 1929 – 5 December 2008) was the 15th Patriarch of Moscow and all Rus', the primate of the Russian Orthodox Church.

Elected Patriarch of Moscow in 1990, eighteen months before the dissolution of the Soviet Union, he became the first Russian Patriarch of the post-Soviet period.

== Family history ==
Alexey Mikhailovich Ridiger was a patrilineal descendant of a Baltic German noble family. His father, Mikhail Aleksandrovich Ridiger (1900–1960), was a descendant of Captain Heinrich Nikolaus (Nils) Rüdinger, commander of a Swedish fortification in Daugavgrīva, Swedish Livonia who was knighted by Charles XI of Sweden in 1695. Swedish Estonia and Swedish Livonia became part of the Russian Empire in the aftermath of the Great Northern War, in the beginning of the 18th century. Friedrich Wilhelm von Rüdiger (1780–1840), adopted Orthodox Christianity during the reign of Catherine the Great. From the marriage with a Polish woman, Sophie Dorothea Jerzębska, was born the future Patriarch's great-grandfather, Yegor (Georgi) von Rüdiger (1811–1848).

After the October Revolution of 1917, Alexey Ridiger's father Mikhail became a refugee and the family settled in Estonia, first in Haapsalu where a shelter was provided by priest Ralph von zur Mühlen. Later Mikhail moved to Tallinn, the capital of Estonia, where he met and married in 1928 to Yelena Iosifovna Pisareva (1902–1955), who was born and later died there. Alexey Ridiger's father graduated from the theological seminary in Tallinn in 1940 and was ordained a deacon and later a priest and served as the rector of the Church of the Nativity of the Mother of God in Tallinn. Later, he was a member and the chairman of the Diocesan Council in Estonia.

Patrilineal family tree

Heinrich Nikolaus (Nils) Rüdinger (died 1711)	Peter von Rüdinger	Karl Magnus von Rüdinger (1753–1821)	Friedrich Wilhelm (Fyodor Ivanovich) von Rüdiger (1780–1840)	Yegor (Georgi) Fyodorovich Ridiger (1811–1848)	Aleksandr Yegorovich Ridiger (1844–1877)	Aleksandr Aleksandrovich Ridiger (1870–1928)	Mikhail Aleksandrovich Ridiger (1900–1960)	Aleksei Mikhailovich Ridiger (1929–2008)
Christine Elisabeth von Wickede (1680–1721)	Elisabeth Wiesner	Charlotte Margarethe von Maltitz (1758 – 1786)	Sophie Dorothea Jerzębska	Margarethe Hamburger	Yevgenia Germanovna Gizetti (died 1905)	Aglaida Yulievna Balts (1870–1950)	Yelena Iosifovna Pisareva (1902–1955)	Aleksei Mikhailovich Ridiger (1929–2008)

== Biography ==
=== Early life ===
Alexey Ridiger (born Aleksei Rüdiger) was born and spent his childhood in the Republic of Estonia that had become a Russian Orthodox spiritual center and a home to many Russian émigrés after the Russian October Revolution in 1917. He was baptised into the Estonian Apostolic Orthodox Church. From his early childhood Alexey Ridiger served in the Orthodox Church under the guidance of his spiritual father, Archpriest Ioann Bogoyavlensky. He attended Tallinn's Russian Gymnasium.

After the Soviet occupation of Estonia in 1940, Alexey's family was listed for arrest in order to be deported from Estonia according to the Serov Instructions, but were not found by the NKVD because instead of staying in their home they were hiding in a nearby hovel.

During the occupation of Estonia by Nazi Germany (1941–1944) Alexey with his father Mikhail, who had become an Orthodox priest on 20 December 1942, visited the Soviet prisoners of war in German prison camps in Estonia. Such activity was tolerated by the German occupational authorities because it was seen as effective anti-Soviet propaganda. After Soviet forces returned to Estonia in the autumn of 1944, unlike most of the people with Baltic German roots, the Ridiger (Rüdiger) family chose to stay in Estonia instead of evacuating to the West.

During the war Joseph Stalin had revived the Russian Orthodox Church in the Soviet Union. Having been closed during the war time, after the Soviet annexation of Estonia the Alexander Nevsky Cathedral, Tallinn was reopened in 1945. Alexey Ridiger, who had become a Soviet citizen served as an altar boy in the cathedral from May to October 1946. He was made a psalm-reader in St. Simeon's Church later that year; in 1947, he officiated in the same office in the Church of the Kazan Icon of the Mother of God in Tallinn.

=== Ordination and priesthood ===
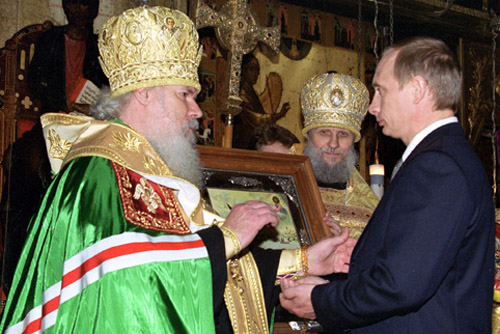
Alexy, in the Kremlin Cathedral of the Annunciation, presents Vladimir Putin with an icon of Saint Alexander Nevsky at the latter's presidential inauguration on 7 May 2000.

He entered the Leningrad Theological Seminary in 1947, and graduated in 1949. He then entered the Leningrad Theological Academy, and graduated in 1953.

On 15 April 1950, he was ordained a deacon by Metropolitan Gregory (Chukov) of Leningrad, and on 17 April 1950, he was ordained a priest and appointed rector of the Theophany church in city of Jõhvi, Estonia, in the Tallinn Diocese. On 15 July 1957, Fr. Alexy was appointed Rector of the Cathedral of the Dormition in Tallinn and Dean of the Tartu district. He was elevated to the rank of Archpriest on 17 August 1958, and on 30 March 1959 he was appointed Dean of the united Tartu-Viljandi deanery of the Tallinn diocese. On 3 March 1961 he was tonsured a monk in the Trinity Cathedral of the Trinity Lavra of St. Sergius.

His name (secular Алексей, clerical Алексий) was not changed when he became a monk, but his patron saint changed from Alexius of Rome to Alexius, Metropolitan of Kiev whose relics repose in the Theophany Cathedral in Moscow.

=== Tenure as bishop ===
On 14 August 1961, he was chosen to be the Orthodox Church Bishop of Tallinn and Estonia, succeeding his father-in-law, John (Alekseev), who was promoted to Archbishop of Gorky and Arzamas. On 23 June 1964, he was elevated to the rank of archbishop. On 22 December 1964, he was appointed Chancellor of the Moscow Patriarchate and, ex officio, a permanent member of the Holy Synod. On 25 February 1968, when he just turned 39 years old, he was elevated to metropolitan.

In 1986 he was released from the post of the Chancellor, which he had held since 1961 and which allowed him to be based in the Moscow Patriarchy's headquarters, and transferred to Leningrad; the decision was effectively made by the Council for Religious Affairs and was later presented by Alexy as punishment for his letter in December 1985 to Mikhail Gorbachev with proposals of reforms to church-state relations. Shortly after Alexy's death, the then Chairman of the Council Kharchev strongly denied that and said the decision was aimed at "defusing the tense emotional atmosphere within Patriarch Pimen's inner circle". In an earlier interview Kharchev suggested the removal had been requested by Patriarch Pimen "for a year".

Alexy was one of the presidents of the Conference of European Churches from 1964. In March 1987 he was elected President of the CEC Presidium and Advisory Committee, in which post he remained until November 1990. Criticized for Ecumenism by some within the Russian Orthodox Church, Alexy responded by saying that such were opinions expressed not by representatives of the church but expressed as private views of free citizens.

==== KGB ====
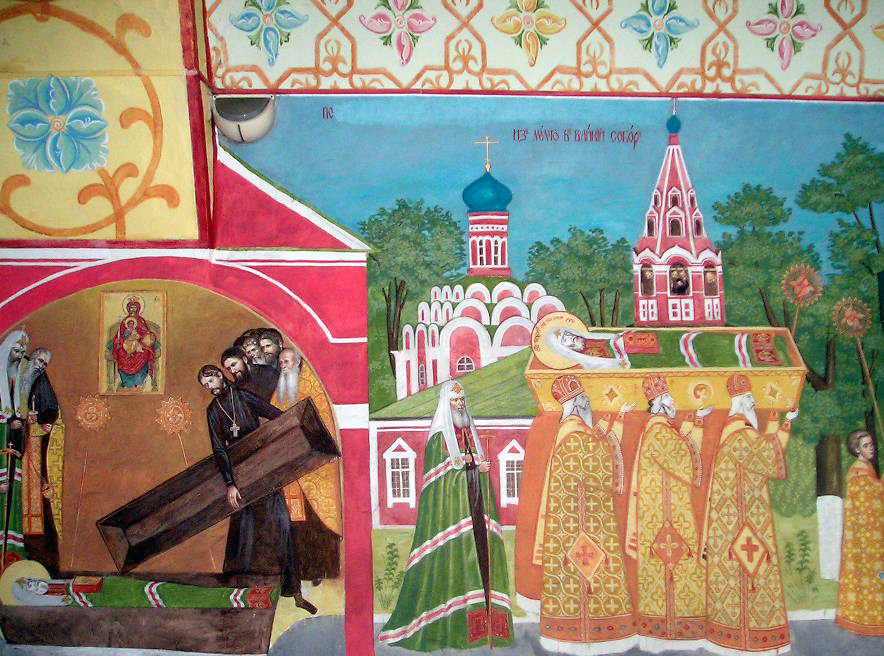
Modern fresco of the Donskoi Monastery, representing Alexy II bringing the relics of Patriarch Tikhon into the monastery.

There have been reports, beginning in the 1990s, that Patriarch Alexy II had been a KGB agent. These reports originate with Gleb Yakunin, a member of the committee created for the investigation of the Soviet coup attempt of 1991 and chaired by Lev Ponomaryov, who thereby gained the access to secret KGB archives. In March 1992 he published materials alleging cooperation between the Moscow Patriarchate and the KGB. He published code names of several KGB agents who held high-rank positions in the Russian Orthodox Church including Patriarch Alexius II. The Russian church defrocked Yakunin in 1993. The allegation was repeated by Yevgenia Albats in 1994. Western media reported on these allegations in 1999 and again in 2007/8. The Patriarch was also named as a "KGB collaborator" in a 2015 interview with defected former KGB general and suspected double agent Oleg Kalugin.

It is alleged that the Estonian branch of the KGB recruited Alexy as an agent on 28 February 1958, just days after his 29th birthday, assigning him the codename "Drozdov" (he had completed his dissertation on Metropolitan Filaret Drozdov). The report detailing his recruitment makes clear that the KGB contacted Alexy, then still a simple priest, because they expected him to succeed John (Alekseev) as Bishop of the Russian Orthodox diocese of Tallinn and Estonia (and he was in fact appointed to this post less than three years later). Among his KGB assignments was one in 1983, when he was sent to the Pskov-Caves Monastery to "pacify" rebellious monks.

The reports further allege that Alexander Grigoryev, a KGB officer in Leningrad under cover as Orthodox priest Fr Alexander was his case officer for a while. According to Oleg Gordievsky, Alexy II worked for the KGB for forty years, and his case officer was Nikolai Patrushev. In February 1988, exactly 30 years after his recruitment, the KGB chairman awarded him the Certificate of Honour.

Patriarch Alexy II acknowledged that compromises were made with the Soviet government by bishops of the Moscow Patriarchate, himself included, and publicly repented of these compromises:

"Defending one thing, it was necessary to give somewhere else. Were there any other organizations, or any other people among those who had to carry responsibility not only for themselves but for thousands of other fates, who in those years in the Soviet Union were not compelled to act likewise? Before those people, however, to whom the compromises, silence, forced passivity or expressions of loyalty permitted by the leaders of the church in those years caused pain, before these people, and not only before God, I ask forgiveness, understanding and prayers."

At the same time, the Patriarch has called the reports making him out to be "KGB agent" mere exaggerations of such necessary compromises he had to make with the Soviet authorities. Similarly, the official spokesman for the Moscow Patriarchy, Father Vsevolod Chaplin, in 2000 claimed that reports of Patriarch Alexy II being an "associate of the special services" are "absolutely unsubstantiated".

Albats (1994) cites Konstantin Kharchev, former chairman of the Soviet Council for Religious Affairs, as saying: "Not a single candidate for the office of bishop or any other high-ranking office, much less a member of Holy Synod, went through without confirmation by the Central Committee of the CPSU and the KGB".

In summary, a degree of "collaboration" with the Soviet authorities was necessary for all bishops. Whether such collaboration represents a necessary "compromise" or suffices to qualify the bishops as "KGB agents" appears to be a matter of interpretation. According to Davis (1995), "If the bishops wished to defend their people and survive in office, they had to collaborate to some degree with the KGB, with the commissioners of the Council for Religious Affairs, and with other party and governmental authorities." When asked by the Russian press about claims that he was a "compliant" bishop, "Aleksi defended his record, noting that while he was bishop of Tallinn in 1961, he resisted the communist authorities' efforts to make the Alexander Nevsky Cathedral in the city a planetarium (which, in truth, they did do elsewhere in the Baltic states) and to convert the Pühtitsa Dormition nunnery to a rest home for miners." Official records do show that during Patriarch Alexy's tenure as bishop, the Tallinn diocese had a lower number of forced Church closings than was typical in the rest of the USSR. In the judgement of Ware (1997), "Opinions differ over the past collaboration or otherwise between the Communist authorities, but on the whole he is thought to have shown firmness and independence in his dealings as a diocesan bishop with the Soviet State."

=== Patriarch of Moscow and all Rus' ===
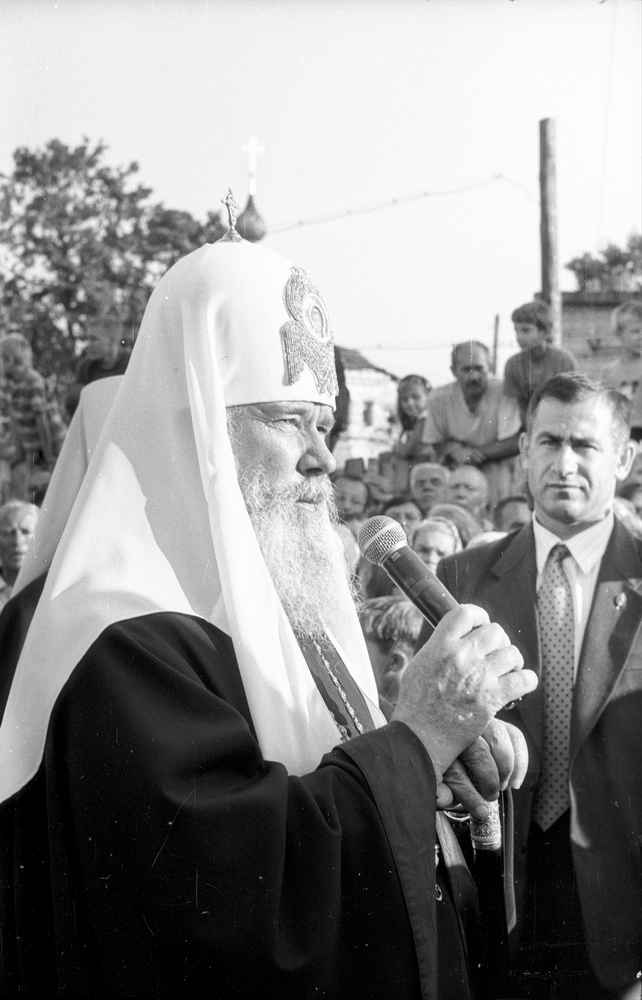
Alexy II speaking to Orthodox believers in Pereslavl (1997)

After the death of Patriarch Pimen in 1990, Alexy was chosen to become the new Patriarch of The Russian Orthodox Church. He was chosen on Local Council on the basis of his administrative experience, and was considered "intelligent, energetic, hardworking, systematic, perceptive, and businesslike." He also "had a reputation as a conciliator, a person who could find common ground with various groups in the episcopate." Archbishop Chrysostom (Martishkin) remarked "With his peaceful and tolerant disposition Patriarch Aleksi will be able to unite us all."

Patriarch Alexy II was "the first patriarch in Soviet history to be chosen without government pressure; candidates were nominated from the floor, and the election was conducted by secret ballot."

Upon taking on the role of Patriarch, Patriarch Alexy II became a vocal advocate of the rights of the church, calling for the Soviet government to allow religious education in the state schools and for a "freedom of conscience" law.

During the attempted coup in August 1991, he denounced the arrest of Mikhail Gorbachev, and anathematized the plotters. He publicly questioned the junta's legitimacy, called for restraint by the military, and demanded that Gorbachev be allowed to address the people. He issued a second appeal against violence and fratricide, which was amplified over loudspeakers to the troops outside the Russian "White House" half an hour before they attacked. Ultimately, the coup failed, which eventually resulted in the breakup of the Soviet Union.

During Alexy II's first official visit to Germany in 1995, the Patriarch publicly apologized for the "Communist tyranny that had been imposed upon the German nation by the USSR". The apology resulted in accusations by Russian Communists and the Russian National Bolshevik Party of insulting the Russian nation and treason.

In July 1998 Alexy II decided not to officiate in the Saints Peter and Paul Cathedral, Saint Petersburg at the burial of the royal family executed by the Bolsheviks in 1918, a ceremony attended by president Boris Yeltsin, citing doubts about the authenticity of the remains.

Under his leadership, the New Martyrs and Confessors of Russia who suffered under Communism were glorified, beginning with the Grand Duchess Elizabeth, Metropolitan Vladimir, and Metropolitan Benjamin (Kazansky) of Petrograd in 1992.

In 2000, after much debate, the All-Russian Council glorified Tsar Nicholas II and his family (see Romanov sainthood), as well as many other New Martyrs. More names continue to be added to list of New Martyrs, after the Synodal Canonization Commission completes its investigation of each case.

Alexy II had complicated relations with Pope John Paul II and the Roman Catholic Church. He had a dispute with Rome over the property rights of the Byzantine Rite Eastern Catholic Churches in Ukraine, which had emerged from Soviet control after the Gorbachev's liberalisation of Russia. He nevertheless had good relations with Latin Catholics in France and was friends with Cardinal Roger Etchegaray, who invited him to the country shortly before his death.

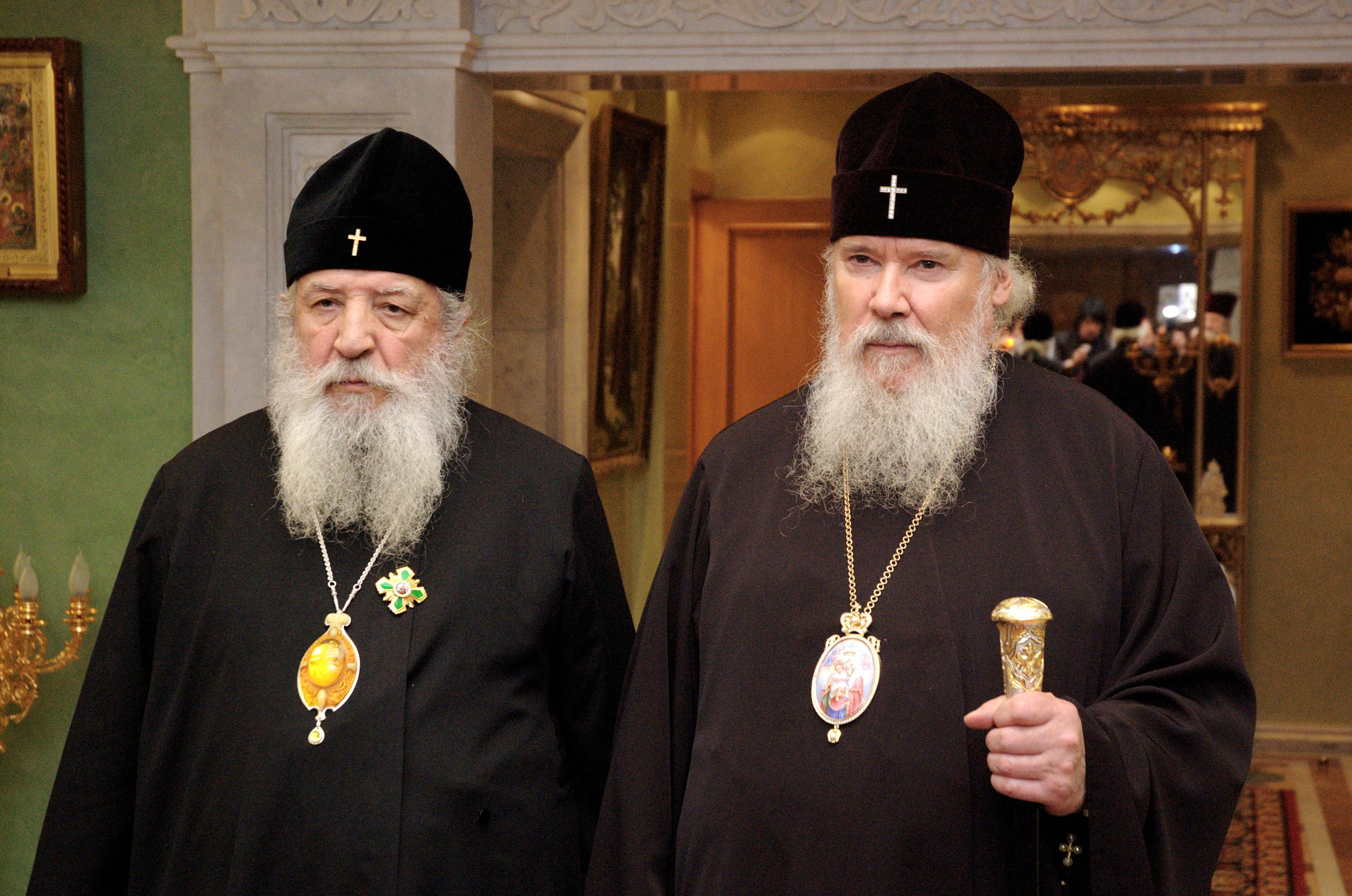
Patriarch Alexy II (right) with Metropolitan Laurus (Škurla), Hierarch of the ROCOR (left) at the Peredelkino residence.

Patriarch Alexy II repeatedly affirmed the traditional stand of the Orthodox Church and opposed the display of homosexuality in Russia, and in particular, opposed gay parades in Moscow and St. Petersburg. The Church, according to the Patriarch, "has invariably supported the institution of the family and condemns untraditional relations, seeing them as a vicious deviation from God-given human nature". He also said, "I am convinced that gays' desire to organize a parade in Moscow will not help strengthen the family as the foundation of a strong state". He also said that homosexuality is an illness, and a distortion of the human personality like kleptomania. Patriarch Alexy II has also issued statements condemning anti-Semitism. In February 2007 a controversy erupted when Diomid, Bishop of Chukotka, condemned the ROC's hierarchy and personally Patriarch Alexy II for ecumenism, supporting democracy and misguided loyalty to the Russian secular authorities. Bishop Diomid also took the position that taxpayer IDs, cell phones, passports, vaccination and globalisation were tools of the antichrist, and that the leaders of the Russian Orthodox Church have "departed from the purity of the Orthodoxal dogma" in its support of the Russian government and of democracy, as well as its ecumenism with other confessions. After a decision of the All-Russian Council, and Bishop Diomid's refusal to appear, he was defrocked in July 2008.

In 2007, Patriarch Alexy II oversaw the reunification of the Moscow Patriarchate with the Russian Orthodox Church Outside Russia (ROCOR). The Act of Canonical Communion was signed on 17 May 2007. The ROCOR had been established in the early 1920s by Russian bishops forced into exile after the Russian Civil War, and was highly critical of the Moscow Patriarchate's loyalty to the Bolshevik regime after Stalin's revival of the church in 1943 in an attempt to intensify the patriotic war effort. Shortly before the signing of the Act of Canonical Communion, there were some reports in Russian media claiming that Patriarch Alexy II was in critical condition or even dead. This was soon revealed as a hoax, apparently designed to disrupt the reunification of the two branches.

=== Personal life ===
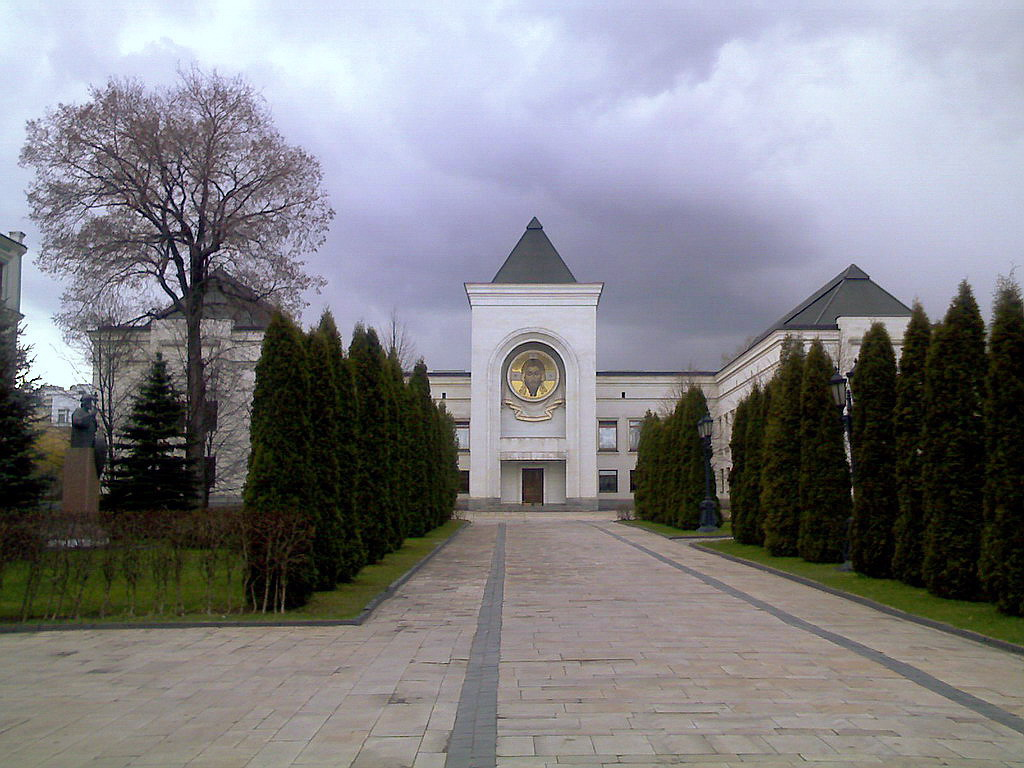
Danilov Monastery, the residence of the Patriarch and the Holy Synod

On 11 April 1950, he married Vera Alekseeva, daughter of Georgi Alekseev, who would serve as bishop John of Tallinn from 1955 to 1961.

The wedding took place on the Tuesday of Bright Week when marriages are normally prohibited according to Church tradition; however, permission was granted by Metropolitan Gregory of Leningrad, at the request of Bishop Roman of Tallinn and the fathers of both the bride and groom (both of whom were priests, and who concelebrated the marriage together). Moskovskiye Novosti has alleged that according to a denunciation written by a priest-inspector Pariysky to the Leningrad Council of Religious Affairs, the marriage had been expedited in order for Ridiger to become a deacon and avoid being drafted into the Soviet Military (marriage is impossible after ordination in Orthodoxy). Up until 1950, seminarians were given a deferment from the draft, but in 1950 this was changed, and only clergy were exempt. For reasons which have remained private, they divorced less than a year later.

The Patriarch's private residence was located in the village of Lukino (near Peredelkino), now a western suburb of Moscow; it includes a 17th-century church, a museum, and a spacious three-storey house built in the late 1990s. According to the Patriarch's May 2005 interview on the residence's compound, nuns drawn from the Pühtitsa Convent take care of all the household chores.

There was also a working residence in central Moscow—a 19th-century town mansion, which had been turned over to the Patriarchate by Stalin's order in September 1943. Both residences acted as living quarters and Patriarch's office at the same time. He commuted in an armored car and was under the protection of federal agents (FSO) since January 2000.

The formal residence (infrequently used for some official functions) is located in the Moscow Danilov Monastery – a two-storey Soviet building erected in the 1980s.

=== Death and burial ===
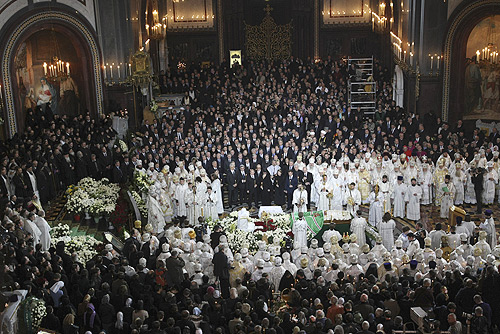
Funeral of Alexy II at the Cathedral of Christ the Saviour on 9 December 2008.

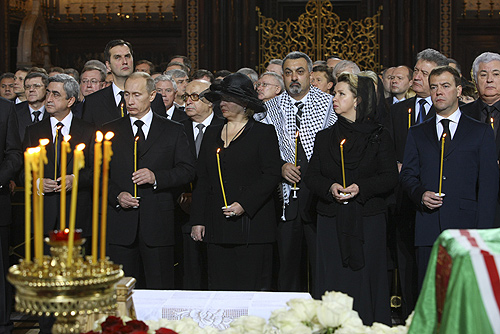
Mourners at the funeral of Alexy II including Serzh Sargsyan, Vladimir Putin, Dmitry Medvedev and Vladimir Voronin.

Alexy II died at his home at his Peredelkino residence on 5 December 2008, reportedly of heart failure. He died 80 days short of his 80th birthday (23 February 1929 – 5 December 2008), being just one single day older at death than his predecessor, Pimen (Izvekov), who had died 81 days short of his 80th birthday (23 July 1910 – 3 May 1990).

On 7 December 2008, Russian president Medvedev issued a decree which "enjoined" that on the day of the Patriarch's burial Russia's cultural establishments and broadcasters should cancel entertaining programs and assistance be furnished to the Patriarchate on the part of the federal and city governments for organization of the burial. However, the order did not amount to a formal national mourning.

On 9 December 2008, the Order for the Burial (funeral service) of the deceased patriarch was presided over by the Ecumenical Patriarch Bartholomew I at the Cathedral of Christ the Saviour, whereafter he was interred in the southern chapel of the Epiphany Cathedral at Elokhovo in Moscow.

During the service in the Christ the Saviour Cathedral, which was broadcast live by Russia's state TV channels, after Kathisma XVII had been chanted and Metropolitan Kirill set about doing the incensing round the coffin, he appeared to teeter and, being propped up by two bishops, was ushered into the sanctuary and was absent for about an hour. Reuters reported: "Kirill was helped away by aides at one point and a Kremlin official said he had apparently fainted. The metropolitan later rejoined the funeral." The ROC official spokesman Vsevolod Chaplin lashed out at the news media that had reported the incident "incorrectly" insisting that Kirill had not fainted, but merely had "felt unwell".

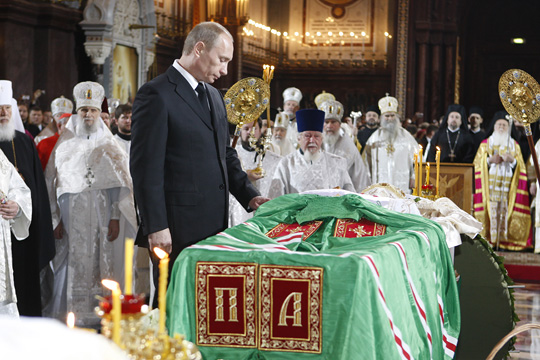
Prime Minister Putin at the coffin of Patriarch Alexy.

The following is a selection of quotes from notable obituaries:

- Russian Prime-minister Vladimir Putin: "Patriarch Alexy II had been a prominent figure in the history of the Russian Orthodox Church, as well as a great statesman <...> he made a very considerable contribution to relations between various faiths. It would not be an exaggeration to say that he had friendly relations with representatives of all traditional faiths in Russia". Putin also acknowledged that Alexy II "did a great deal to help establish a new governance system in Russia".
- Toomas Hendrik Ilves, President of Estonia: "I will always remember Alexius II as an especially wise man who was respected by people from the religious and secular worlds alike."
- The BBC published an anonymous obituary entitled "Double life of Russia's patriarch": "Patriarch Alexy II had an extraordinary career, in which he switched from suppressing the Russian Orthodox Church to being its champion. A favourite of the KGB, he was promoted rapidly through the Church hierarchy, doing the Kremlin's bidding at a time when dissident priests were thrown into jail. As the Church's effective foreign minister, he helped cover up the repression of Russian Christians, defending the Soviet system to the outside world. He rose quickly through the ranks, being elected head of the Russian Orthodox Church at a crucial time, in 1990, with the Soviet Union on the path to collapse. Surprisingly, perhaps, he seized the moment, and went on to oversee the revival and flowering of the Church."
- Rabbi Arthur Schneier, a leader in the American Jewish community, was asked by church officials to attend the Patriarch's funeral. In a statement, he stated that Alexy II "served as the ethical pulse of the religious community in the former Soviet Union under a regime that neither welcomed nor tolerated people of faith and the leaders of organized religion."

== Awards and honors ==
- 2000 – Russia, the national Man of the Year prize and the Outstanding People of the 1990–2000 Decade.
- 2003 – Estonian civilian order, the Order of the Cross of Terra Mariana, 1st Class.
- 2005 – The first laureate of the State Prize of the Russian Federation for humanitarian work.
- 2006 – The Muslim Board of the Caucasus Allahshukur Pashazade, the highest Muslim Order of Sheikh ul-Islam.

Patriarch Alexy II was an honorary member of the Theological Academies in St. Petersburg, Moscow and Crete, Greece. He was made Doctor of Theology honoris causa at the Debrecen Reformed Theological University in Debrecen, Hungary. He also was honored by St. Vladimir's Seminary and St. Tikhon's Seminary an at the Alaska Pacific University, Anchorage in the USA. He was given the title of honorary professor by the Omsk State University and the Moscow State University. He was given an honorary Doctorate of Philology by Saint Petersburg State University. He was given an honorary Doctorate of Theology by the Theological Faculty of the University of Belgrade. He was given an honorary Doctorate of Theology by the Tbilisi Theological Academy in Georgia. He received a Golden Medal from the Faculty of Orthodox Theology of the Kosice University in Kosice, Slovakia, and was an honorary member of the International Charity and Health Foundation.

Awards of the Russian Orthodox Church and other local churches

- Order of St. Andrew with a diamond star
- Order "Glory and Honor" (2005)
- Order of the Holy Prince Daniel of Moscow, 1st class
- Order of St. Alexis the Metropolitan of Moscow and All Russia, 1st class
- Order of St. Macarius the Metropolitan of Moscow and All Russia, 1st class
- Order of St. Prince Vladimir Equal, 1st class (27 May 1968) and 2nd class (11 May 1963)
- Order of St. Sergius, 1st class (21 February 1979)
- Order of St. Innocent Metropolitan of Moscow and Kolomna, 1st class
- Order of Saint Blessed Prince Dimitry Donskoy great, 1st class (2005)
- Order of Saints Cyril and Methodius, 1st class (Czechoslovak Orthodox Church, 20 October 1962)
- Order of St. John of Rila, 1st class (Bulgarian Orthodox Church, May 1968)
- Order of St. Mark (Orthodox Church of Alexandria, 1969)
- Order of the Holy Cross, 1st and 2nd classes (Jerusalem Orthodox Church, 1968, 1984)
- Order of St. George, 1st and 2nd classes (Georgian Orthodox Church, 1968, 1972)
- Order of the Apostles Peter and Paul, 2nd class (Antiochian Orthodox Church, 1 September 1981)

Other orders Metropolitan Patriarch of Antioch

- Order of St. John the Martyr Archbishop of Riga, 1st class (Latvian Orthodox Church, 28 May 2006)
- Medal of 1,500th anniversary of the Patriarchate of Jerusalem (1965)
- Gold medal, 1st class the Holy Great Martyr Demetrius of Thessalonica (Greece, 25 September 1980)
- Gold Medal of the I degree Archdiocese of St. Catherine of Katerini (Greece, 4 May 1982)
- Medal "15 years of Kemerovo and Novokuznetsk dioceses" (Diocese of Kemerovo and Novokuznetsk, 22 March 2008)

State awards of the Russian Federation

- Order of St. Andrew (19 February 1999) – for outstanding contribution to the spiritual and moral rebirth of Russia, to preserve peace and harmony in society
- Order of Merit for the Fatherland, 1st class (23 February 2004) – for outstanding contribution to strengthening peace and harmony between peoples, the restoration of historical and cultural heritage of Russia; 2nd class (11 September 1997) – for outstanding contribution to the achievement of unity and harmony in society and long-term peacekeeping efforts
- Order of Friendship of Peoples (22 February 1994) – for his great personal contribution to the spiritual revival of Russia and active peacemaking
- State Prize of the Russian Federation for outstanding achievements in the field of humanitarian action in 2005 (9 June 2006, presented 12 June).

State awards of the USSR

- Order of the Red Banner of Labour
- Order of Friendship of Peoples (22 November 1979)

Awards of the Russian Federation

- Order of the "Key of Friendship" (Kemerovo region)
- Order of the White Lotus (Kalmykia, 1997)

Departmental awards

- Commemorative Medal Gorchakov (Russian Foreign Ministry, 2002)
- Badge "For mercy and charity" (Ministry of Education and Science of the Russian Federation, 2003) [137].
- Medal "For contributions to the development of agro-industrial complex" I degree (Ministry of Agriculture of Russia, 2005) [138]
- Medal of Anatoly Koni (Russian Ministry of Justice, 2000) [139]

Foreign awards

- Order of "Glory" (Azerbaijan, 14 September 2005) – for services in the development of friendly relations between the peoples of Azerbaijan and Russia
- Order of the Cross of Terra Mariana, 1st class (Estonia, 29 September 2003)
- Order of the Three Stars, 1st class (Latvia, 27 May 2006)
- Order of Friendship of Peoples (Belarus, 26 March 2004) – for the fruitful work of rapprochement and mutual enrichment of national cultures, and his great personal contribution to the spiritual and intellectual potential of the fraternal peoples of Belarus and Russia
- Order of Francisc Skorina (Belarus, 23 September 1998) – for outstanding achievements in developing and strengthening friendly relations between nations
- Medal of Honour (Belarus, 2008)
- Medal of Francysk Skaryna (Belarus, 22 July 1995) – for outstanding contribution to the Orthodox Church in the spiritual revival of the Belarusian people
- Order of the Republic (Moldova, 12 November 2005)
- National Order of the Cedar (Lebanon, 6 October 1991)
- Order of the Lithuanian Grand Duke Gediminas, 1st class (Lithuania, 1997)
- Order Dostyk, 1st class (Kazakhstan, 2002)
- Order of the Republic (PMR, 8 February 1999) – for his invaluable contribution in promoting the true Orthodox faith of our fathers, a huge, sustained attention, and displaying to the children of the One Holy Catholic Apostolic Church of our State, and in connection with the 70th anniversary of the birth

Community Awards

- Diploma of the Soviet Peace Fund (23 August 1969)
- Medal and certificate of the Soviet Peace Foundation (13 December 1971)
- Commemorative medal inscribed board of the Soviet Peace Fund (1969)
- Medal of the World Peace Council (1976) – in connection with the 25th anniversary of the peace movement
- Medal of the Soviet Peace Committee (1974) – in connection with the 25th anniversary of the Committee
- Diploma of the Soviet Peace Committee (November 1979)
- Certificate of Merit and a commemorative medal of the Soviet Peace Fund (November 1979)
- Commemorative medal of the World Peace Council (1981) – in connection with the 30th anniversary of the peace movement
- Honour Board of the Soviet Peace Foundation (15 December 1982) – for active participation in the fund
- Charter of the Soviet-Indian friendship
- KGB Certificate of Honour (February 1988)
- Honorary citizenship of Moscow, St. Petersburg, Novgorod, Sergiev Posad, the Republic of Kalmykia, of the Republic of Mordovia, of the Leningrad Region, the Republic of Karelia (2006), Dimitrov (2003), Murom (Vladimir Region, 2006), Kemerovo Region (2005) and Podolsk, Moscow Region (2001)

Honorary degrees

- Honorary Doctor of the Baku Slavic University, [163]
- Honorary Doctor of Petrozavodsk State University (2000) [164]
- Planck's Order of St. Pervozvannogo
- Order "For merits before Fatherland" I degree
- Order "For merits before Fatherland" II degrees
- Order of Red Banner of Labor Order of Friendship Order of Friendship of Peoples
- Medal Anatoly Koni
- Medal for contributions to the development of agriculture
- Band to White Lotus (Kalmykia). Png
- Order of "Glory" (Azerbaijan)
- Order of Friendship of Peoples (Belarus)
- Order Skarina
- Order of Merit (Belarus)
- Medal of Francis Skorina rib.png
- Order of the Republic (PMR)
- Grand Cross of the Order of the Cross Mary's Land
- Knight Grand Cross of the Order of Three Stars
- Knight Grand Cross of the Order of the Lithuanian Grand Duke Gediminas
- Dostyk Order of 1st degree
- Most of the National Order of the Cedar tape
- Order of the Republic (Moldova)
- Tape "15 years of the Diocese of Kemerovo and Novokuznetsk". Png
- Russian Federation State Prize
- Order "Glory and Honor"
- The Order of St. Alexis the Metropolitan of Moscow and All Russia, I degree
- Order of St. Prince Vladimir Equal-I degree (ROC)
- Order of St. Prince Vladimir Equal-II degree (ROC)
- Order of the Holy Prince Daniel of Moscow, I degree
- The Order of St. Innocent, Metropolitan of Moscow and Kolomna, a degree
- The Order of Saint Blessed Prince Dimitry Donskoy great I degree
- Order of St. Sergius I of a degree
- Honorary citizen of Moscow

== Notes ==
Eastern Orthodox Church titles
Preceded by John Alekseev	Metropolitan of Tallinn and Estonia; 1961–1986	Succeeded by Cornelius Jakobs
Preceded by Pimen	Patriarch of Moscow and all Russia; 1990–2008	Succeeded by Kirill
