= Chancellery of the Moscow Patriarchate =

Chancellery of the Moscow Patriarchate (Chancellery of the Moscow Patriarchy, Russian: Управление делами Московской патриархии) is a subdivision of the Moscow Patriarchate, acting as a synodal institution. Since 1961 the Chancellor of the Moscow Patriarchate (Russian: Управляющий делами Московского Патриархата) is a permanent member and secretary of the Holy Synod of the Russian Orthodox Church (ex officio).

== History ==
After the establishment of the Provisional Patriarchal Holy Synod in 1927, the position of Chancellor of the Synod was created under the Deputy Patriarchal Locum Tenens Metropolitan Sergius (Stragorodsky). On May 18, 1935, due to the forced liquidation of the Provisional Patriarchal Holy Synod, the position of the Chancellor of the Provisional Patriarchal Holy Synod was renamed the Chancellor of the Moscow Patriarchate.

On March 16, 1961, the Holy Synod of the Russian Orthodox Church decided to include among its permanent members the Chancellor of the Moscow Patriarchate and the chairman of the Department of External Church Relations. These positions were now to be filled by persons in the rank of bishop. On July 18, 1961, the Council of the Russian Orthodox Church, following a report by Metropolitan Pitirim (Sviridov) of Krutitsy, approved this resolution and made appropriate changes to paragraphs 18 and 19 of the "Regulations on the Administration of the Russian Orthodox Church".

On March 5, 2010, the Holy Synod of the Russian Orthodox Church adopted a Regulation on the Chancellery of the Moscow Patriarchate.

On July 26, 2010, by the decision of the Holy Synod Russian Orthodox Church, the control and analytical service for the Chancellery of the Moscow Patriarchate was established.

On May 30, 2019, the Holy Synod approved a new version of the Regulation on the Chancellery of the Moscow Patriarchate.

== Chancellors ==
- Archpriest Alexander Lebedev (18 May 1935 — 19 August 1937) was arrested on April 14, 1937.
- Archbishop Sergius (Voskresensky) (8 October 1937 — 24 February 1941)
- Protopresbyter Nikolai Kolchitsky (1 April 1941 — 5 July 1960)
- Archbishop Pimen (Izvekov) (5 July 1960 — 14 November 1961)
- Archbishop Cyprian (Zernov) (14 November 1961 — 25 February 1964)
- Metropolitan Pimen (Izvekov) (25 February — 22 December 1964)
- Metropolitan Alexy (Ridiger) (22 December 1964 — 29 July 1986)
- Metropolitan Sergius (Petrov) (29 July 1986 — 30 December 1987)
- Metropolitan Vladimir (Sabodan) (30 December 1987 — 27 May 1992)
- Metropolitan Sergius (Fomin) (17 July 1996 — 26 December 2003)
- Metropolitan Clement (Kapalin) (26 December 2003 — 31 March 2009)
- Metropolitan Barsanuphius (Sudakov) (31 March 2009 — 26 February 2019)
- Metropolitan Sabbas (Mikheev) (26 February — 29 October 2019)
- Metropolitan Dionysius (Porubay) (29 October 2019 — 11 October 2023)
- Metropolitan Gregory (Petrov) (since 11 October 2023)
