= Volodymyr Sabodan =

Ukrainian bishop and Primate (1935–2014)

Hero of Ukraine His Beatitude Volodymyr
- Metropolitan of Kyiv and all Ukraine
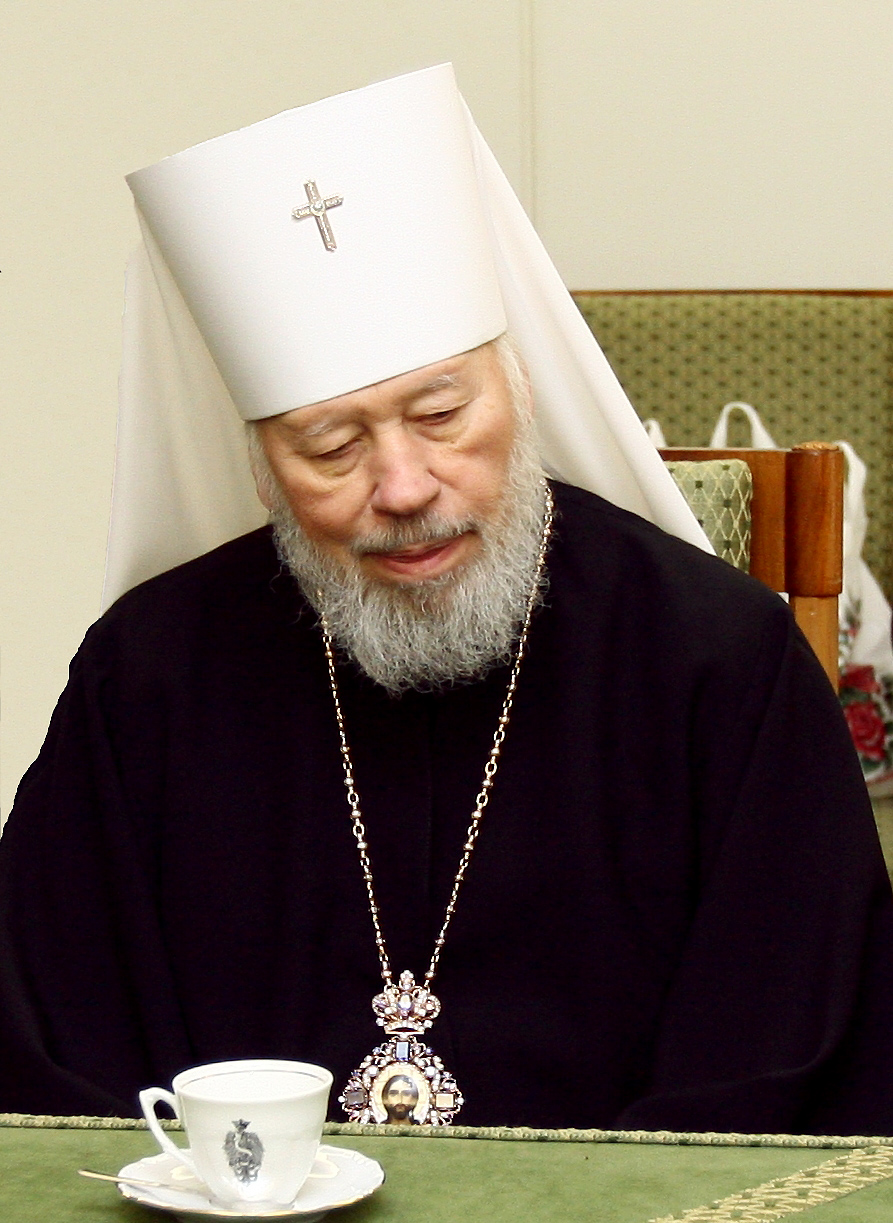
- Volodymyr in 2008
- Church: Ukrainian Orthodox Church (Moscow Patriarchate)
- Elected: 27 May 1992
- Predecessor: Filaret
- Successor: Onufriy

Orders
- Ordination: 15 June 1961
- Consecration: 9 July 1966 by Pimen I of Moscow

Personal details
- Born: 23 November 1935 Markivtsi, Ukrainian SSR, Soviet Union
- Died: 5 July 2014 (aged 78) Kyiv, Ukraine

Metropolitan Vladimir (Volodymyr; secular name Viktor Markianovich Sabodan, Russian: Виктор Маркианович Сабодан, Ukrainian: Віктор Маркіянович Сабодан, 23 November 1935 – 5 July 2014) was the Metropolitan of Kiev and the Exarch of Ukraine in the Patriarchate of Moscow, and, ex officio, the head of the Ukrainian Orthodox Church (Moscow Patriarchate) (UOC-MP) from 1992 to 2014. He was styled "His Beatitude, Vladimir, Metropolitan of Kyiv and all Ukraine". At that time, the Church in Ukraine was the only Eastern Orthodox Church inside Ukraine to have canonical standing (legal recognition) in Eastern Orthodoxy worldwide.

== Early life ==
Viktor Sabodan was born on 23 November 1935 in a peasant family in Letychiv Raion of Vinnytsia Oblast (today - Khmelnytskyi Oblast). In the late 1950s and early 1960s, he studied at Odesa and later at Leningrad Theological Seminary. In 1965, he completed the post-graduate course at the Moscow Theological Academy and was appointed Rector of the Odesa Theological Seminary and elevated to the rank of Archimandrite. In 1966, he was appointed Deputy Head of the Russian Orthodox Ecclesiastical Mission in Jerusalem.

== Episcopacy ==
In 1966 Sabodan was appointed Bishop of Zvenigorod. His episcopal consecration was conferred on 9 July 1966 by Pimen I of Moscow in the Trinity Lavra of St. Sergius. In 1969 he was nominated Bishop of Chernihiv and temporary administrator of Sumy Diocese. On 9 September 1973 he was elevated to the rank of Archbishop of Moscow Diocese and Rector of the Moscow Theological Academy and Seminary.

On 16 July 1982 he was appointed to Rostov-on-Don Diocese and elevated to the rank of Metropolitan. From 1984 he was Patriarchal Exarch of Western Europe, and from 1987, Chancellor of Moscow Patriarchate and a permanent member of the Holy Synod of the Russian Orthodox Church (ex officio).

In 1992, he was elected by the Kharkiv Council of the Ukrainian Orthodox Church as Metropolitan of Kyiv, and Primate of the Ukrainian Orthodox Church. Later than year he was enthroned as Metropolitan of Kyiv and all Ukraine, replacing Metropolitan Filaret who was excommunicated for "participating in schismatic activities."

Sabodan was the author of numerous research papers on theology, the majority of which were included in the six-volume edition of his works published in 1997–1998.

Sabodan enjoyed singing and collected recordings of Ukrainian folk songs as well as stamps and postcards.

In January 2008, Sabodan performed the service of consecration of the altar and temple in the parliament (Verkhovna Rada) of Ukraine.

In 2011 Sabodan was awarded the title Hero of Ukraine.

== Death ==
Sabodan died on 5 July 2014, at the age of 78, from internal bleeding. Metropolitan Onuphrius was elected his successor on 13 August 2014.

== State awards ==
- Hero of Ukraine (The Order of the State) (2011)
- Member of the Order of Liberty
- The Order of Prince Yaroslav the Wise 1st (2008), 2nd (2005), 3rd (2002), 4th (2000) and 5th (1999) cl.

== See also ==
- Ukrainian Orthodox Church (Moscow Patriarchate)
- History of Christianity in Ukraine
