= Diocese of Penza =

Diocese of Penza Пензенская епархия
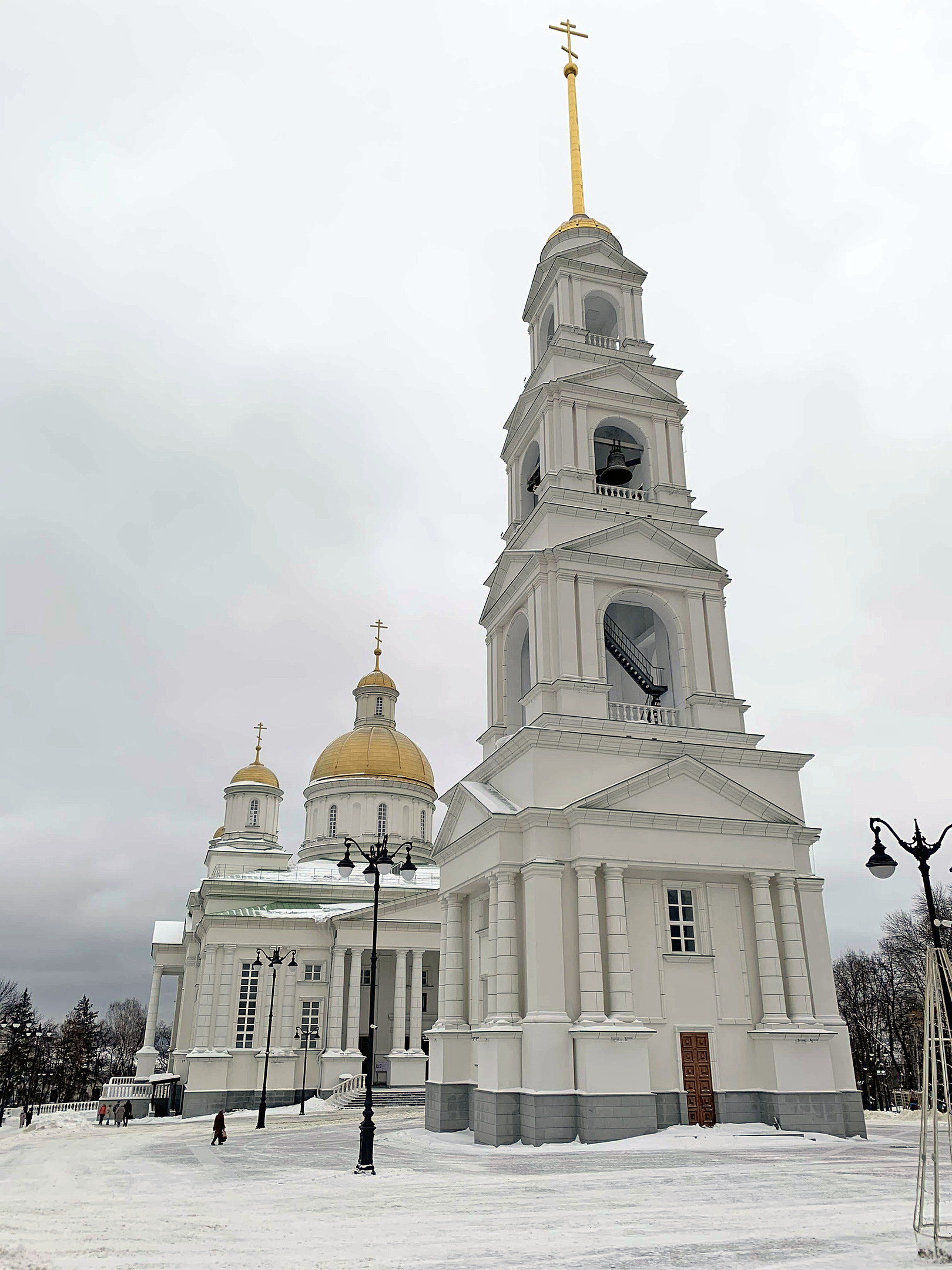
- Spassky Cathedral in Penza

Location
- Deaneries: 10
- Headquarters: Penza

Information
- Denomination: Eastern Orthodox
- Sui iuris church: Russian Orthodox Church
- Established: 4 December 1803
- Cathedral: Spassky Cathedral
- Language: Church Slavonic

Current leadership
- Governance: Eparchy
- Bishop: Serafim (Domnin) since 25 December 2013

Website
- пензенская-епархия.рф

The Diocese of Penza (Russian: Пензенская епархия) is a diocese (eparchy) of the Russian Orthodox Church, uniting parishes and monasteries in the middle part of the Penza region (within the borders of Bessonovsky, Gorodishchensky, Kamensky, Mokshansky, Nizhnelomovsky, Penza and Shemysheysky districts). It is part of the Penza Metropolitanate.

The ruling bishop is Metropolitan Serafim (Domnin) of Penza and Nizhnelomov (since December 25, 2013). In 1745, the territory of the modern Penza diocese came under the jurisdiction of the Astrakhan bishop and remained as such until 1758.

== History ==
On October 27 (October 16, old style), 1799, the Saratov and Penza Orthodox Diocese was formed, but due to the absence of a bishop's house and premises for a consistory in the provincial city of Saratov, the department was located in the district city of Penza, where there were such buildings. The first archpastor of the newly formed diocese was His Grace Archbishop Gaius (Takaov). Starting from December 4, 1803, the diocese began to be called Penza and Saratov, and from November 12, 1828, it already acquired an independent status and began to be called Penza and Saransk, and it retained this name until 1991, when a separate Saransk and Saratov diocese was separated from its composition. Mordovian diocese, and the Penza bishops began to be called Penza and Kuznetsk.

Over the more than 200-year period of existence of the Penza diocese, it was successively ruled by 44 Eminences, 18 before 1917 and 27 after the revolution.

The Penza Diocese was virtually eliminated on February 14, 1938, when Bishop Irakli (Popov), who had been appointed to the Penza See the year before, was shot. In fact, he was no longer a bishop, but a bishop of one Mitrofan Church. There was no connection with the diocese, since any contact, if the authorities wanted, could turn into a counter-revolutionary conspiracy. Despite the terror unleashed by the Bolshevik regime against the clergy and believers, during the Great Patriotic War, Orthodox residents of Penza took a large part in replenishing the country's Defense Fund (they contributed 500 thousand rubles to the tank column named after Dimitri Donskoy alone)

The diocese was revived in the spring of 1944, with two operating churches (in 1948 their number in the Penza Oblast increased to 32). However, in 1962 (during the Khrushchev anti-religious campaign), the Commissioner of the Council for the Affairs of the Russian Orthodox Church for the Penza Region proposed closing the Penza Diocesan Administration, since only 48 Orthodox churches and houses of worship operated in the Penza Region and the Mordovian Autonomous Soviet Socialist Republic.

In 1982 in the Penza region there were 36 priests and 14 psalm-readers, and in 1987 there were 38 and 20, respectively. Moreover, the educational level was very high - in 1986, among the Penza ministers of the Orthodox cult, three were candidates of theology. In 1989, the Narovchatsky Trinity Scan Monastery began its work.

In 2000, the government of Penza Oblast transferred 176 churches to the diocese, the vast majority of which are in disrepair or dilapidated condition.

By the decision of the Holy Synod of July 26, 2012, the Kuznetsk and Serdobsk dioceses were separated from the Penza diocese and included in the newly formed Penza Metropolis.

== Bishops ==
- Gaiy (Takaov) (October 16, 1799 - January 10, 1808)
- Moses (Gemini-Platonov) (March 25, 1808 - May 28, 1811)
- Afanasy (Korchanov) (September 5, 1811 - January 8, 1819)
- Innokenty (Smirnov) (March 22 - October 10, 1819)
- Ambrose (Ornatsky) (November 9, 1819 - September 4, 1825)
- Iriney (Nestorovich) (January 31, 1826 - July 26, 1830)
- John (Dobrozrakov) (August 17, 1830 - January 19, 1835)
- Ambrose (Morev) (January 19, 1835 - October 15, 1854)
- Varlaam (Uspensky) (December 4, 1854 - October 7, 1862)
- Anthony (Smolin) (November 9, 1862 - August 21, 1868)
- Grigory (Mediolansky) (August 21, 1868 - April 24, 1881)
- Anthony (Nikolaevsky) (May 14, 1881 - April 15, 1889)
- Vasily (Levitov) (April 22, 1889 - July 12, 1890)
- Mitrofan (Nevsky) (July 12, 1890 - November 13, 1893)
- Pavel (Vilchinsky) (November 13, 1893 - June 4, 1902)
- Tikhon (Nikanorov) (June 4, 1902 - July 25, 1907)
- Mitrofan (Simashkevich) (July 25, 1907 - January 10, 1915)
- Vladimir (Putyata) (January 10, 1915 - August 2, 1917)
- Theodore (Lebedev) (February - March 1918) v/u, Bishop of Priluki
- Grigory (Sokolov) (March - April 1918) v/u, Bishop of Krasnoslobodsky
- John (Pommer) (April 22, 1918 - July 1921)
- Boris (Lentovsky) (summer 1921 - June 1922)
- Leonty (Ustinov) (May - June 1922) v/u, Bishop of Krasnoslobodsky
- Peter (Sokolov) (1923) temporary, Bishop of Serdobsk
- Philip (Perov) (December 2, 1923 - November 9, 1927)
- Kirill (Sokolov) (September 6, 1928 - November 21, 1933)
- Alexy (Kuznetsov) (November 21, 1933 - March 27, 1934)
- Iriney (Shulmin) (April 26, 1934 - May 21, 1935)
- Abraham (Churilin) (May 21 - October 6, 1935) did not arrive due to arrest
- Feodor (Smirnov) (October 6, 1935 - February 16, 1937)
- Irakli (Popov) (February 22, 1937 - February 14, 1938)
- 1938-1944 - department widowed
- Kirill (Pospelov) (April 1 - July 1944)
- Mikhail (Postnikov) (July 1944 - January 27, 1947)
- Kirill (Pospelov) (January 27, 1947 - December 18, 1953)
- Jerome (Zakharov) (December 1953 - February 9, 1954) v/u
- Leonid (Lobachev) (February 9, 1954 - March 22, 1960)
- Feodosius (Pogorsky) (March 22, 1960 - July 30, 1968)
- Polycarp (Priymak) (July 30, 1968 - December 16, 1969)
- Hilarion (Prokhorov) (December 16, 1969 - June 25, 1970)
- Melchizedek (Lebedev) (June 25, 1970 - October 10, 1978)
- Seraphim (Tikhonov) (October 18, 1978 - July 3, 2000)
- Barsanuphius (Sudakov) acted temporarily
- Filaret (Karagodin) (December 28, 2000 - May 31, 2010)
- Veniamin (Zaritsky) (May 31, 2010 - December 25, 2013)
- Seraphim (Domnin) (from December 25, 2013)
