= Aristarchus Stankevich =

Aristarchus (Stankevich)
- Native name: Aristarkh Stankevich
- Church: Belarusian Orthodox

Personal details
- Born: July 9, 1941 Asavieckaja Buda, Mazyr Raion, Gomel Oblast, Byelorussian SSR
- Died: April 22, 2012 (aged 70)

Archbishop Aristarkh (secular name Andrey Yevdokimovich Stankevich, Russian: Андре́й Евдоки́мович Станке́вич, Belarusian: Андрэй Еўдакімавіч Станкевіч; 9 July 1941 – 22 April 2012) was the Belarusian Orthodox bishop of Gomel and Zhlobin, Belarus.
