= Danilov Monastery =

Monastery in Moscow

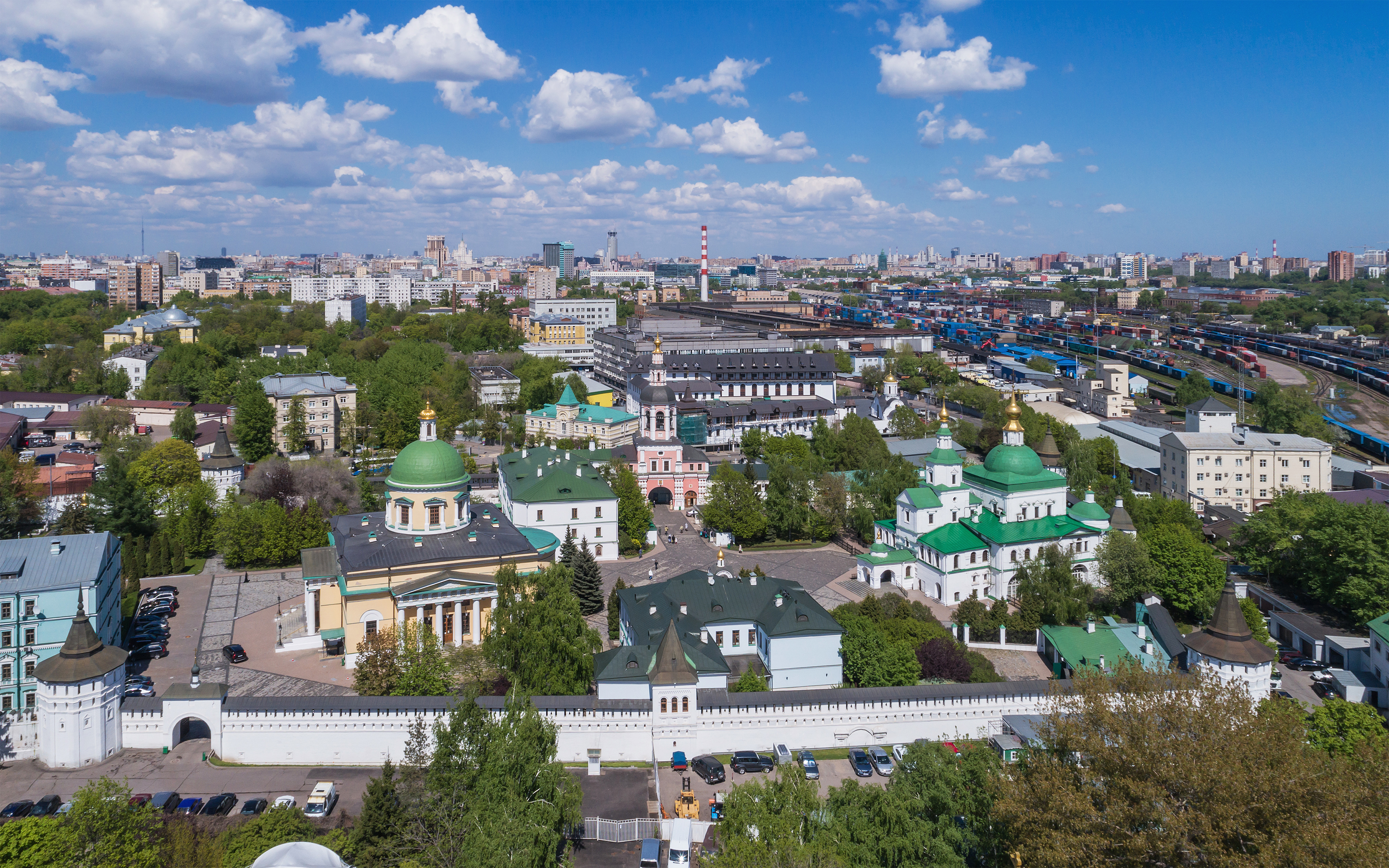
- Interactive map of Danilov Monastery

Monastery information
- Other name: Holy Danilov Monastery
- Order: Orthodox
- Established: 13th century
- Diocese: Moscow

People
- Founder: Daniil
- Abbot: Archimandrite Alexius

Site
- Location: Moscow, Russia
- Coordinates: 55°42′40″N 37°37′45″E
- Other information: Headquarters of the Russian Orthodox Church since 1983.

Danilov Monastery (also Svyato-Danilov Monastery or Holy Danilov Monastery; Russian: Данилов монастырь, Свято-Данилов монастырь, romanized: Danilov monastyr', Svyato-Danilov monastyr') is a walled monastery on the right bank of the Moskva River in Moscow. Since 1983, it has functioned as the headquarters of the Russian Orthodox church and the official residence of the Patriarch of Moscow and all Rus'.

== History ==
Danilov Monastery is claimed to have been founded in the late 13th century by Alexander Nevsky's son Daniel. Shortly before his death in 1303, Daniel is supposed to have taken monastic vows and been buried there. The Russian Orthodox church venerates him as a saint. Daniel's successors had this monastery relocated to the Kremlin. All that remained at the original location was a graveyard.

In 1560, Ivan the Terrible visited the village of Danilovskoye and noticed the neglected graveyard. Upon learning about the old monastery, he invited monks to settle there again. In 1591, when the armies of a Crimean khan Kaza Giray approached Moscow, the grounds were fortified and used as a mobile camp.

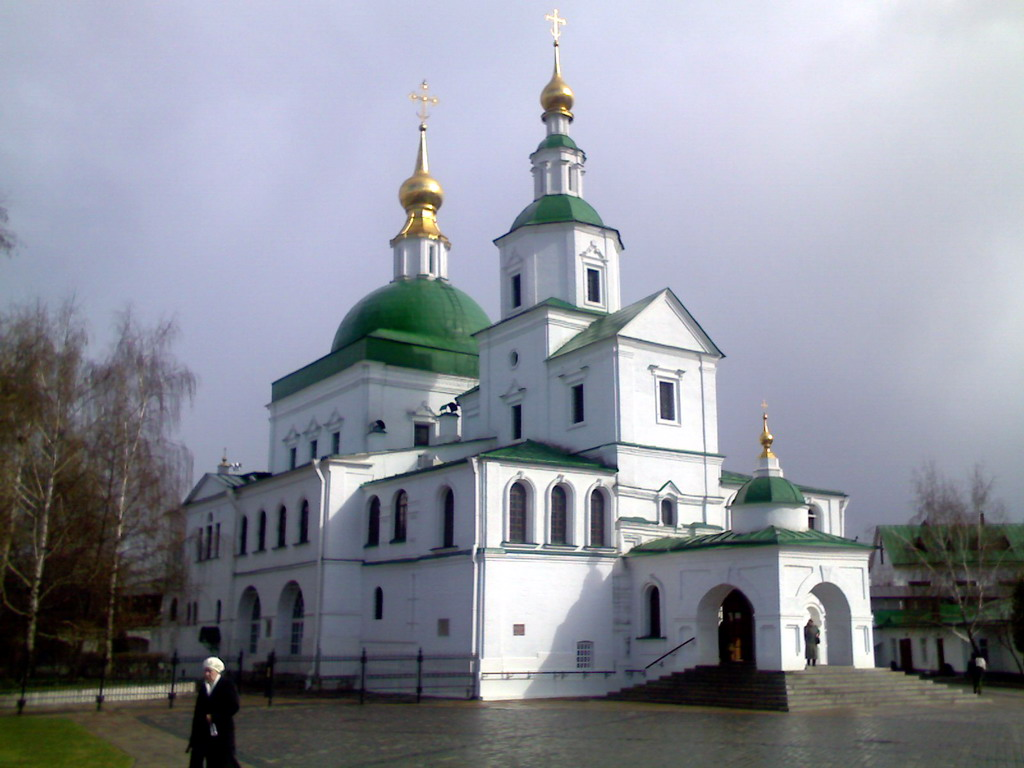
The katholikon consists of three churches: one below and two above.

In 1606, the rebels led by Ivan Bolotnikov and Istoma Pashkov collided with the army of Vasili IV not far from the monastery. In 1607, an impostor by the name of Ileyka Muromets, who had pretended to be tsarevich Peter (son of Feodor I of Russia), was executed next to Danilov Monastery. Being in the center of many military events during the Time of Troubles, the monastery was severely damaged in 1610. In the early 17th century, it was surrounded by a brick wall with seven towers.

In 1710, there were 30 monks in Danilov Monastery. In 1764, there were only twelve of them on staff. By 1900, however, the number rose to seventeen. Among the monks who lived in Danilov Monastery during its history was the renowned Greek scholar Nikephoros Theotokis, who retired to this monastery in 1792 from his bishop's position in South Russia, and lived here until his death in 1800.

In 1805, an almshouse for elderly women was established at the monastery; later it was turned into an almshouse for elderly clergymen and their widows.

In 1812, the monastery was ransacked by the French army. The monasterial sacristy and treasury, however, had been transported to Vologda and Troitse-Sergiyeva Lavra shortly before the French occupied Moscow.

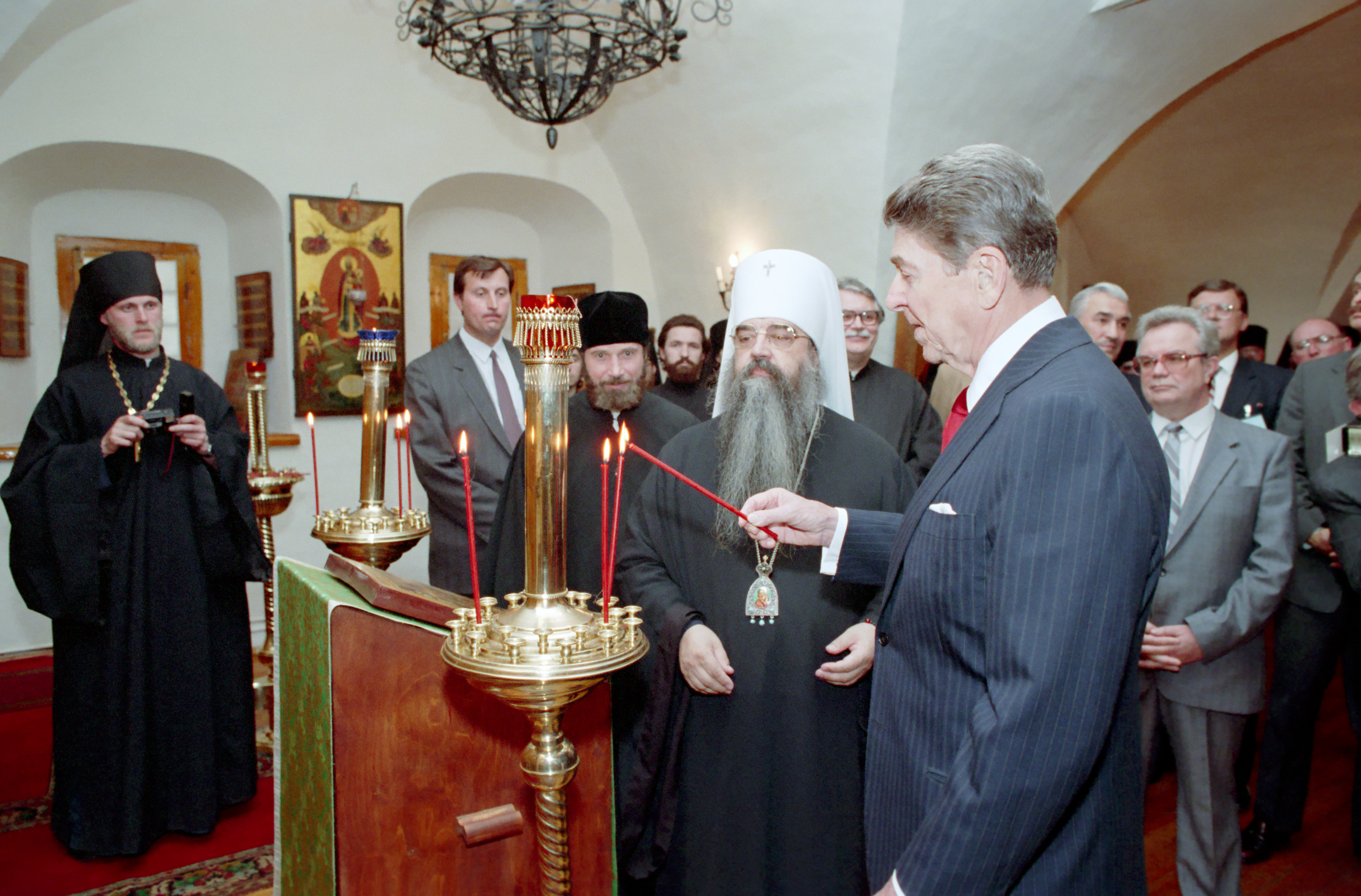
A visit by Ronald Reagan in 1988

First documented information on Danilov Monastery's landownership can be traced back to 1785, when it owned 18 desyatinas of land. By the end of the 19th century, the monastery had already possessed 178 desyatinas and a few buildings in Moscow.

In the second half of the 19th century, Danilov Monastery's cemetery was a final resting place for many writers, artists and scientists, such as Nikolai Gogol, Nikolai Yazykov, Vasili Perov, Nikolai Rubinstein, Vladimir Solovyov and many others. The remains of most of them, however, were transported in Soviet years to the Novodevichy Cemetery. By 1917, Danilov Monastery had 19 monks and four novices and owned 164 desyatinas of land.

After the October Revolution, the monastery housed archimandrites who had been deprived of their pulpits. In 1930, the monastery (the last remaining in Moscow) was closed and used as a NKVD reception facility for detained street children and for children whose parents had been arrested (приёмник-распределитель НКВД, or priyomnik-raspredelitel' NKVD).

The monastery became the first one in Moscow to be returned in 1983 to the Moscow Patriarchy and became a spiritual and administrative centre of the Russian Orthodox Church. In 1988, the monastery was restored. A residence was built for the Patriarch and Synod, as well as a funeral chapel and a chapel in commemoration of the 1000 years of Russia's baptism.

== Buildings ==
Apart from the 17th-century defensive towers and walls, the surviving buildings include the katholikon (main church), the Neoclassical cathedral of the Holy Trinity (1833–1838), the Baroque gate church and belltower of St Simeon Stylites (1681, 1732), a group of 19th-century dwellings for monks and the father superior, and the extensive modern residence of the Holy Synod and the Patriarch (1988). Right next door is the large parish church of the Renovation of the Temple in Jerusalem, built in 1832–1837 to Neoclassical designs by Fyodor Shestakov.

The oldest building is the katholikon dedicated to the Holy Fathers of the First seven ecumenical councils (a dedication not found anywhere else in the Christian world). The lower temple was built during the reign of Tsar Alexis as a church dedicated to the feast of the Intercession. Two Baroque upper churches were completed in 1730 and 1752, respectively. The katholikon is the only building in Moscow to feature two distinct churches above another church on the ground floor.

== Bells ==
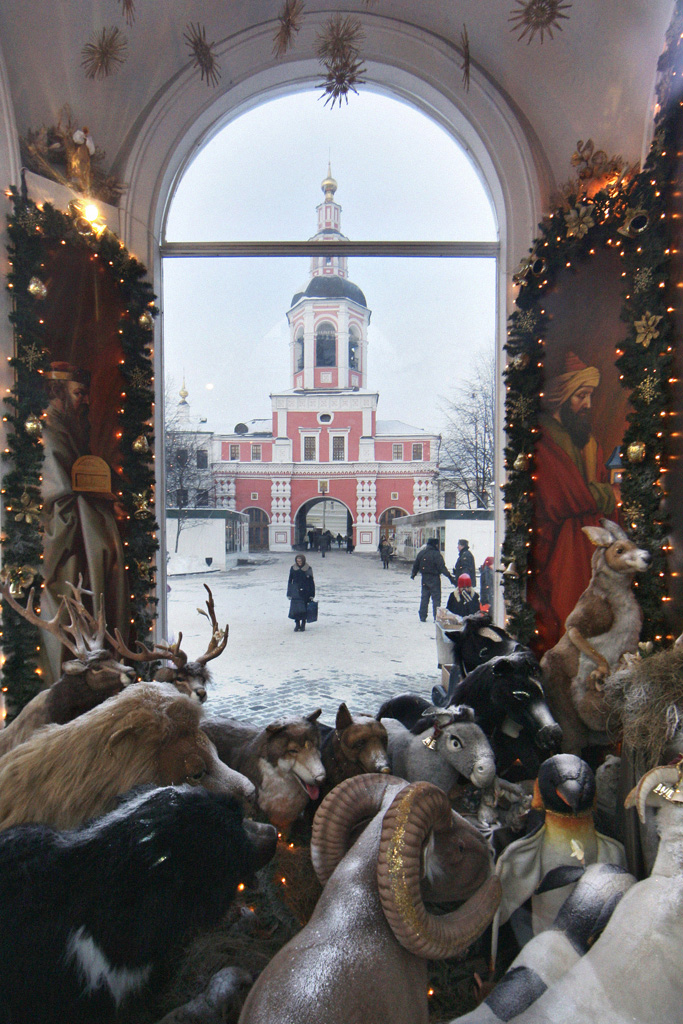
The belltower (as seen from a crèche)

When the monastery was closed in 1929 and 1930, its bell set was saved from Communist melting through the purchase by American industrialist Charles R. Crane. The largest of the bells, Bolshoi (or The Big One - called The Mother Earth Bell at Harvard), weighs 13 tonnes and has a 320 kg clapper. The smallest weighs just 10 kilos. Crane donated the bells to Harvard University and they were installed in the main tower of Harvard's Lowell House and at the Harvard Business School's Baker Library. Beginning in the 1980s, with openness under Gorbachev, there were calls to return the bells, and after numerous meetings over the years, the bells were returned to the Russian Orthodox Church in the fall of 2008. Russian industrialist Viktor Vekselberg, famous for buying up a number of Faberge Eggs, agreed to pay for the repatriation of the 18 bells and for the cost of casting replacements of them in Russia to be hung at Harvard. The first of the bells, known as the Everyday (or Weekday) Bell, weighing 2.2 tonnes, arrived at the Danilov Monastery on September 12, 2007; the remaining seventeen were returned on September 12, 2008.

== See also ==
- 16th-century Western domes
