= Holy Synod of the Russian Orthodox Church =

Governing body of the Russian Orthodox Church

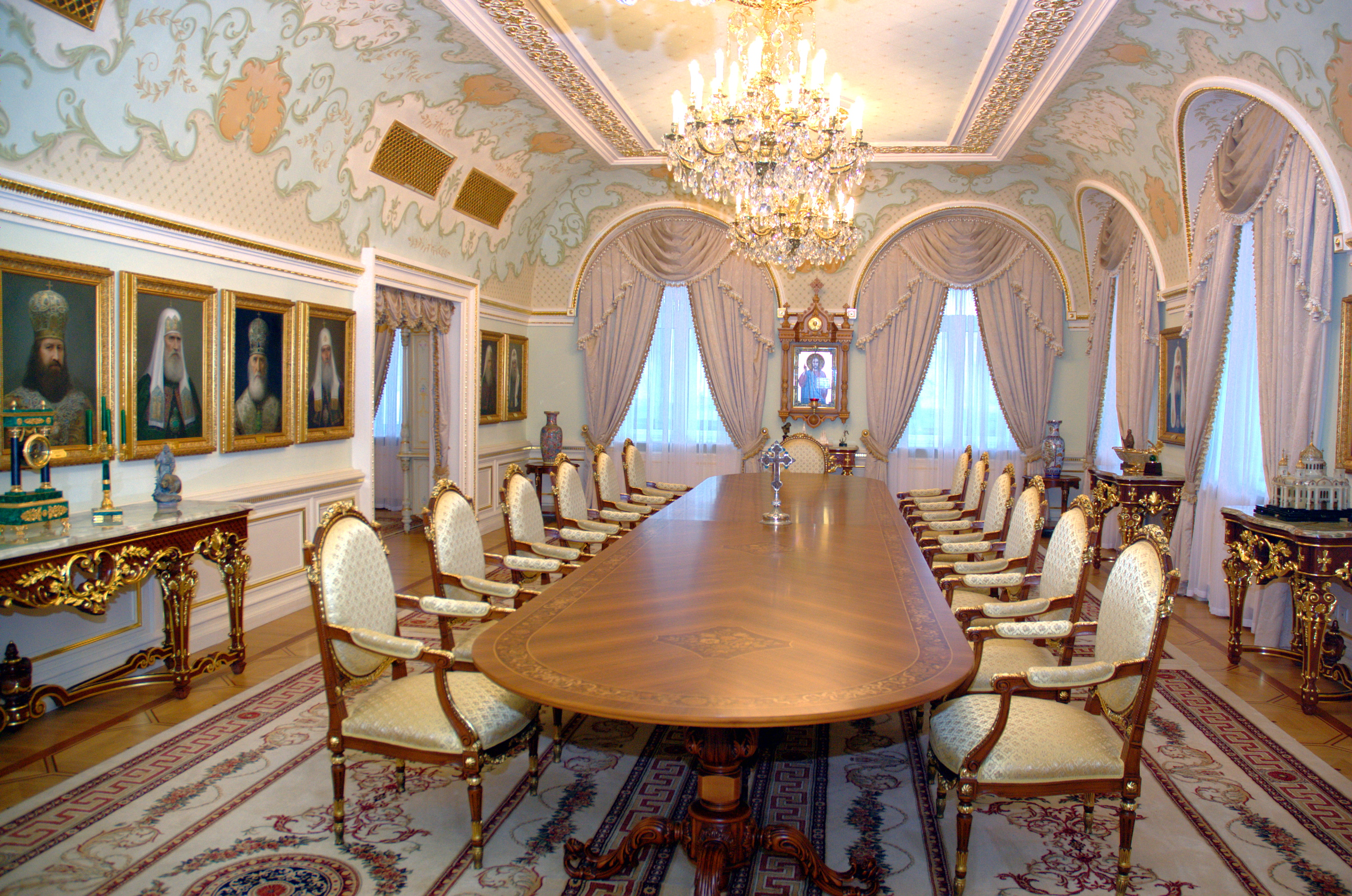
The meeting place of the Holy Synod in Peredelkino, Moscow Oblast.

The Holy Synod of the Russian Orthodox Church (Russian: Священный синод Русской православной церкви, romanized: Svyashchennyy sinod Russkoy pravoslavnoy tserkvi) serves by Church statute as the supreme administrative governing body of the Russian Orthodox Church in the periods between Bishops' Councils.

== Members ==
=== Chairman ===
- Kirill – Patriarch of Moscow and All Russia

=== Permanent members ===
by the cathedra

- Onuphrius – Metropolitan of Kyiv and all Ukraine (listed, but actually did not participate since February 2022)
- Pavel – Metropolitan of Krutitsy and Kolomna, Patriarchal vicar for the Moscow Metropolia
- Varsofony – Metropolitan of St. Petersburg and Ladoga
- Veniamin – Metropolitan of Minsk and Zaslavl, Patriarchal Exarch of All Belarus
- Vladimir – Metropolitan of Chișinău and All Moldova
- Alexander – Metropolitan of Astana and Kazakhstan, Head of the Metropolitan Area in the Republic of Kazakhstan
- Vikenty – Metropolitan of Central Asia, Head of the Central Asian Metropolitan Area

ex officio

- Grigory, Metropolitan of the Voskresensk, First Vicar of the Patriarch of Moscow and All Russia, Chancellor of the Moscow Patriarchy and Secretary of the Synod
- Anthony, Metropolitan of Volokolamsk, chairman of the Department for External Church Relations of the Moscow Patriarchate
- Nikandr, Metropolitan of Vladimir and Suzdal, vicar of the Patriarch of Moscow and All Russia, Chairman of the Financial and Economic Department of the Moscow Patriarchate (since 2024)

=== Temporary members ===
- Konstantin, Metropolitan of Cairo and North Africa, Patriarchal Exarch of Africa, Administrator of the diocese of Southern Africa
- Stefan, Bishop of Kanash and Belovolzhka
- Mitrofan, Bishop of Gatchina and Luga
- Sergy, Bishop of Novorossiysk and Gelendzhik, Dean of Crimea
- Serafim, Bishop of Biysk and Belokurikha

== See also ==
- Most Holy Synod
