= Nicander Pilishin =

Nikandr Pilishin
- Metropolitan
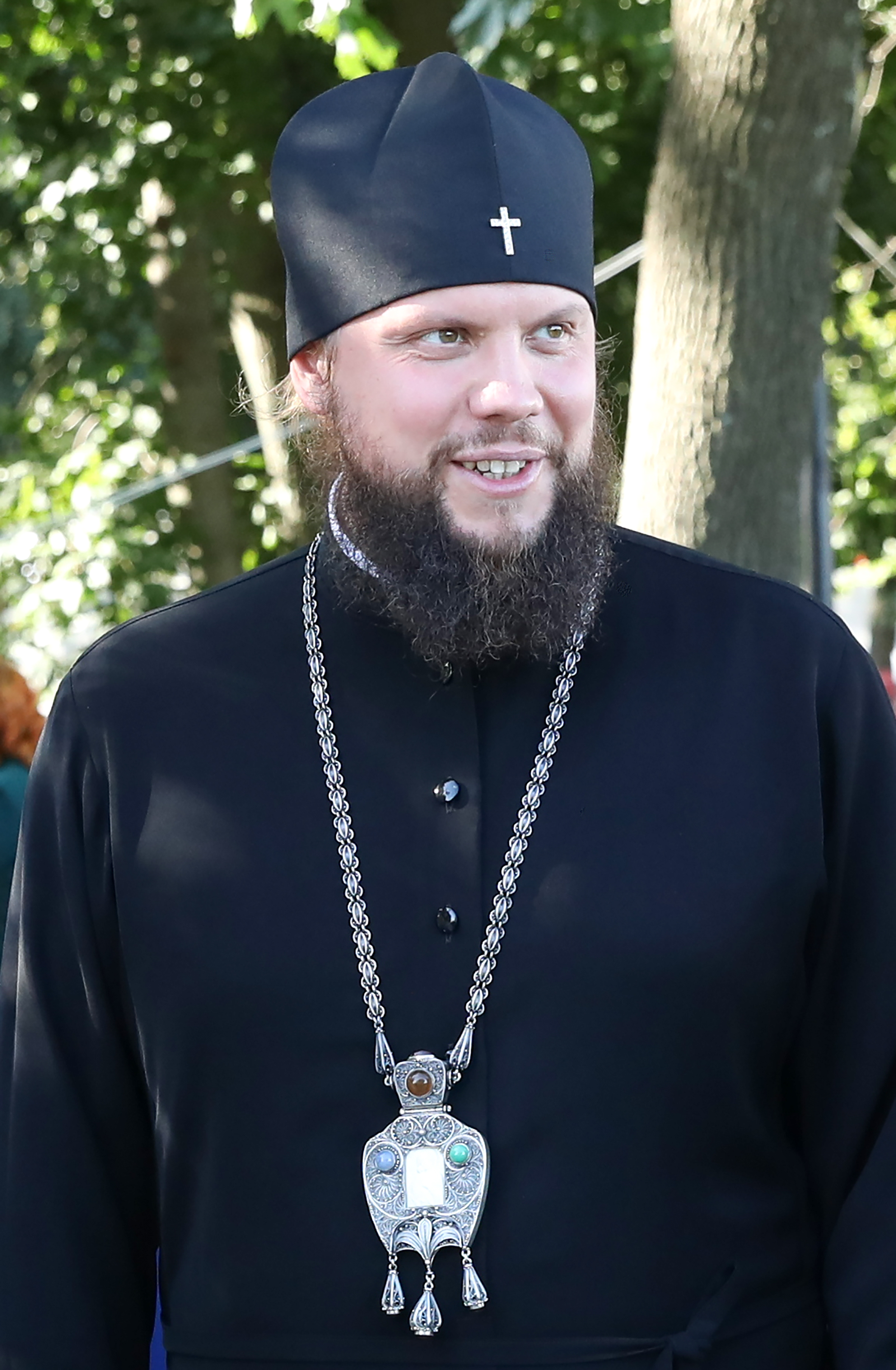
- Metropolitan Nicander at Kitovras book festival in Vladimir. 2025.
- Native name: Никандр (Пилишин)
- Church: Russian Orthodox Church
- See: Vladimir
- Predecessor: Tikhon (Emelyanov)

Orders
- Ordination: 4 December 2016

Personal details
- Born: Sergei Sergeevich Pilishin; 9 September 1986 (age 40) Shakhty, Soviet Union
- Education: Saint Petersburg Mining University; South Russian State Polytechnic University; Moscow Theological Academy

Metropolitan Nicander (Russian: Митрополит Никандр, secular name Sergey Sergeyevich Pilishin, Russian: Серге́й Серге́евич Пили́шин; born September 9, 1986, Shakhty, Rostov Oblast) is a bishop of the Russian Orthodox Church, Metropolitan of Vladimir and Suzdal since December 27, 2024. He is also chairman of the Financial and Economic Administration of the Moscow Patriarchate since 2023 and a permanent member of the Holy Synod of the Russian Orthodox Church ex officio since 2024.

== Biography ==
Born on September 9, 1986 in the city of Shakhty, Rostov Oblast to a family of workers. He was baptized in infancy.

In 2003, he graduated from high school in Shakhty. In 2003-2005, he studied at the Industrial and Humanitarian College of the South Russian State Polytechnic University, specializing in "economics and accounting". In 2005-2009, he studied at the Plekhanov St. Petersburg State Mining Institute, specializing in "mining".

In 2009, he entered the Moscow Theological Academy. In 2009-2010, he underwent professional retraining at the Peoples' Friendship University of Russia under the "journalism" program.

In 2011-2014, he served as a subdeacon to the Patriarch of Moscow and all Rus', Kirill of Smolensk. In 2014-2016, he was a licensing specialist for the Educational Committee of the Russian Orthodox Church.

On April 3, 2015, at the Trinity Cathedral of the Trinity Lavra of St. Sergius, Archbishop Eugene (Reshetnikov) of Vereya, Rector of the Moscow Theological Academy, tonsured him into monasticism with name Nicander in honor of the martyr Nicander of Egypt. On April 20, 2015, he was ordained a hierodeacon by the same bishop.

On June 27, 2016, he completed his Master of Divinity (магистр богословия) thesis at the Moscow Theological Academy, entitled “The Coptic Church during the Second Half of the Twentieth Century,” written under the supervision of priest Ioann Kechkin.

On August 1, 2016, he was accepted into the clergy of the Diocese of Astrakhan and appointed a full-time cleric of the Bishop's Metochion of the Assumption Cathedral in Astrakhan. He served as the head of the diocesan department for Church-Society and Media Relations. On November 25, 2016, he was included in the staff of the Diocese of Astrakhan with the right to transfer to the Diocese of Vologda.

On November 28, 2016, he was accepted into the clergy of the Diocese of Vologda and enrolled in the brotherhood of the Spaso-Prilutsky Dimitriev Monastery in the city of Vologda. On December 4, 2016, he was ordained a hieromonk by Metropolitan Ignatius (Deputatov) of Vologda and Kirillov. From December 15, 2016 he served a steward of the Spaso-Prilutsky Monastery.

From December 5, 2016 to May 4, 2018 he was the rector of the Bishop's Metochion of the Holy Spirit Monastery in the city of Vologda, concurrently. From May 4, 2018 to March 20, 2020 - rector of the Bishop's Metochion "Zaonikieva Hermitage" in the village of Luchnikovo, Vologodsky District, Vologda Oblast, part-time.

In September 2017, he was sent to continue his studies in graduate school at the Moscow Theological Academy. In January 2018, he was transferred to graduate school at the Saint Petersburg Theological Academy due to a change in the direction of his research.

After Metropolitan Ignatius (Deputatov) was transferred to the Diocese of Saratov on August 25, 2020, he followed him. Until November 8, 2021, he served as the rector of the Church of the Church of Our Lady of Vladimir in Saratov, honorary rector of the Bishop's Metochion - Intercession Cathedral in Saratov, vice-rector for strategic development and additional education at the Saratov Theological Seminary.

On November 8, 2021, he was appointed acting deputy chairman of the Financial and Economic Administration of the Moscow Patriarchate.

On November 10, 2021, he was appointed rector of the Church of the Holy Martyr Blasius in Old Konyushennaya Sloboda in Moscow.

On April 28, 2023, by decree of Patriarch Kirill, he was appointed acting chairman of the Financial and Economic Administration, and on August 24, by decision of the Holy Synod, he was approved in this position. He became an ex-officio member of the Supreme Church Council of the Russian Orthodox Church.

On August 28, 2023, in the Patriarchal Dormition Cathedral in the Kremlin, Patriarch Kirill elevated him to the rank of archimandrite.

=== Bishopric ===
On October 11, 2023, by decision of the Holy Synod of the Russian Orthodox Church, he was elected Vicar of the Patriarch of Moscow and all Rus' with the title of "Naro-Fominsk", as well as the Administrator of the North-West Vicariate of the City of Moscow.

On October 13, 2023, he was appointed to the post of Chairman of the Commission on Church Property and Land Ownership under the Diocesan Council of the City of Moscow.

On October 18, 2023, in the Cathedral of Christ the Saviour, he was consecrated a titular bishop of Naro-Fominsk. The consecration was performed by: Patriarch Kirill, Metropolitan Gregory (Petrov) of Voskresensk, Metropolitan Anthony (Sevryuk) of Volokolamsk, Metropolitan Leo (Tserpitsky) of Novgorod and Staraya Russa, Metropolitan Ambrose (Yermakov) of Tver and Kashin, Metropolitan Ignatius (Deputatov) of Saratov and Volsk, Bishop Nicholas (Pogrebnyak) of Balashikha and Orekhovo-Zuyevo, Bishop Constantine (Ostrovsky) of Zaraysk, Bishop Silouan (Vyurov) of Pavlovsky Posad, Bishop Arsenius (Perevalov) of Pskov and Porkhov, Bishop Sabbas (Tutunov) of Zelenograd.

On November 9, 2023, by decree of the Patriarch, he was appointed acting rector of the Church of the Great Martyr Demetrius of Thessaloniki in the village of Dmitrovskoye, Moscow Oblast. On November 10, 2023, in addition to his current obediences, he was appointed acting rector of the Metochion of the Patriarch of Moscow and All Rus' at the Church of St. Nicholas of Myra in the village of Nikolina Gora, Moscow Oblast.

On March 12, 2024, by decision of the Holy Synod, he was included in the number of permanent members of the Holy Synod of the Russian Orthodox Church ex officio. On March 24, 2024, on the Sunday of Orthodoxy, in connection with his inclusion in the number of permanent members of the Synod, Patriarch Kirill elevated him to the rank of metropolitan in the Cathedral of Christ the Savior in Moscow.

On April 11, 2024, by decree of the Patriarch, he was appointed Administrator of the Northern Vicariate of the city of Moscow.

On December 27, 2024, by decision of the Holy Synod of the ROC, he was appointed Metropolitan of Vladimir and Suzdal, head of the Metropolitanate of Vladimir, while retaining the positions of Chairman of the Financial and Economic Administration of the Moscow Patriarchate and permanent member of the Holy Synod.
