= Nikandr =

Nikandr is a given name from Greek: Νίκανδρος, Latin: Nicander. Notable people with the name include:

- Nikandr Molchanov (1852–1910), Russian Orthodox Archbishop of Vilnius and Lithuania
- Nikandr Chibisov (1892–1959)
- Nikandr Petrovsky (1891–1968), Russian teacher best known for his Dictionary of Russian Names
- Nikandr Pilishin (born 1986), Russian Orthodox Metropolitan of Vladimir and Suzdal

== See also ==
- Nicander (name)
