= Nicander (name) =

Nicander of Colophon (fl. 2nd century BC) was a Greek poet, physician, and grammarian.

Nicander may also refer to:

- Nicander of Sparta (fl. 8th century BC), king of Sparta
- Saint Nicander (?), martyr, feast day November 6
- Karl August Nicander (1799–1839), Swedish poet
- Morris Williams (writer) (1809–1874), Welsh bard commonly known as Nicander
- Nicander Pilishin (born 1986), Russian Orthodox Metropolitan of Vladimir and Suzdal

== See also ==
- Nikandr
