= Kudryavtsevo, Vologodsky District, Vologda Oblast =

Kudryavtsevo Кудрявцево
- Village
- Location within Vologda Oblast Location within Russia
- Coordinates: 59°20′N 39°52′E
- Country: Russia
- Region: Vologda Oblast
- District: Vologodsky District
- Time zone: UTC+3:00

Kudryavtsevo (Russian: Кудрявцево) is a rural locality (a village) in Novlenskoye Rural Settlement, Vologodsky District, Vologda Oblast, Russia. As of 2002, the population was 7.

== Geography ==
Kudryavtsevo is located 16 kilometers (10 mi) north of Vologda (the district's administrative center) by road. The nearest rural locality is Luchnikovo.
