= Council of Florence =

Ecumenical Council of the Catholic Church (1431–1449)

Council of Basel-Ferrara-Florence
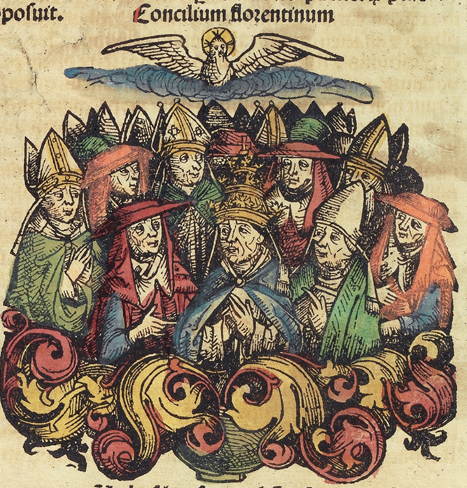
- Council of Florence, from the Nuremberg Chronicle by Hartmann Schedel
- Date: 1431–1445
- Accepted by: Catholic Church; Old Catholic Church; Traditional Catholic Churches
- Previous council: Council of Constance
- Next council: Fifth Council of the Lateran
- Convoked by: Pope Martin V
- President: Julian Cesarini
- Attendance: Very light in first sessions, eventually 117 Latin and 31 Greek delegations
- Topics: Hussites, East–West Schism, conciliarism
- Documents and statements: Several papal bulls, brief reunion with the Eastern Orthodox Church, reunion with delegation from the Armenian Apostolic Church

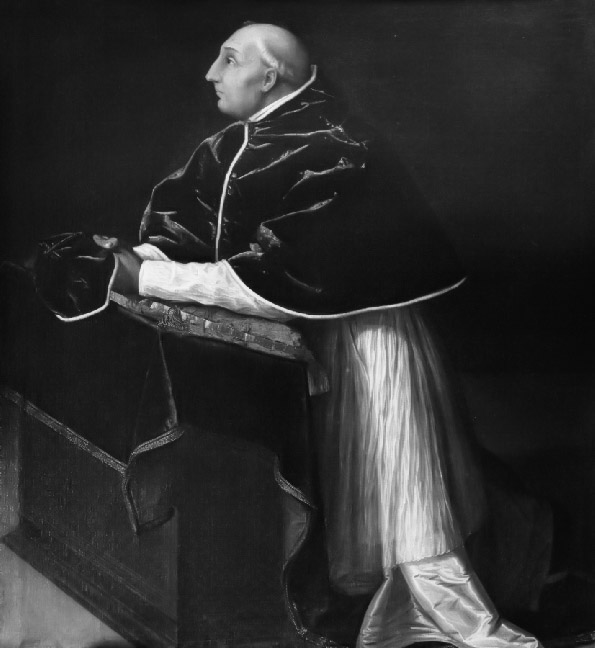
Pope Martin V convoked the Council of Basel in 1431: it became the Council of Ferrara in 1438 and the Council of Florence in 1439

The Council of Florence was the seventeenth ecumenical council recognized by the Catholic Church, held between 1431 and 1445. It was convened in territories under the Holy Roman Empire. Italy became a venue of a Catholic ecumenical council after a gap of about two centuries (the last ecumenical council to be held in Italy was the 4th Council of the Lateran in Rome's Lateran Palace in 1215). It was convoked in Basel as the Council of Basel by Pope Martin V shortly before his death in February 1431 and took place in the context of the Hussite Wars in Bohemia and the rise of the Ottoman Empire. At stake was the greater conflict between the conciliar movement and the principle of papal supremacy.

The Council entered a second phase after Emperor Sigismund's death in 1437. Pope Eugene IV translated the Council to Ferrara on 8 January 1438, where it became the Council of Ferrara and succeeded in drawing some of the Byzantine delegates who were in attendance at Basel to Italy. Some Council members rejected the papal decree and remained at Basel: this rump Council suspended Eugene, declared him a heretic, and in November 1439 elected an antipope, Felix V.

After becoming the Council of Florence (having moved to avoid the bubonic plague in Ferrara), the Council concluded in 1445 with the promulgation of a decree of union with delegates of the Eastern Orthodox Church.

The union was not universally accepted among the Eastern Christian churches. The delegates of the Georgian Orthodox Church and the Church of Alexandria did not sign the decree of union. The Serbian Orthodox Church rejected the union and was not represented at the council. Although delegates from the Patriarchate of Jerusalem and the Patriarchate of Antioch signed the decree, their patriarchs later rejected the union, maintaining that the delegates had not been authorized to make such commitments on behalf of their churches.

The union also met strong opposition in Constantinople, where the overwhelming majority of both clergy and laity rejected it, accusing the emperor and the patriarch of betrayal. As a result, the attempted resolution of the Great Schism proved short-lived and failed to gain broad acceptance in the Eastern Christian world, despite representing a significant political achievement for the papacy.

In 1447, Sigismund's successor Frederick III commanded the city of Basel to expel the Council of Basel; the rump Council reconvened in Lausanne before dissolving itself in 1449.

== Background ==
The initial location in the Prince-Bishopric of Basel reflected the desire among parties seeking reform to meet outside territories directly controlled by the pope, the emperor or the kings of Aragon and France, whose influences the council hoped to avoid. Ambrogio Traversari attended the Council of Basel as legate of Pope Eugene IV.

Under pressure for ecclesiastical reform, Pope Martin V sanctioned a decree of the Council of Constance (9 October 1417) obliging the papacy to summon general councils periodically. At the expiration of the first term fixed by this decree, Pope Martin V complied by calling a council at Pavia. Due to an epidemic the location transferred almost at once to Siena (see Council of Siena) and disbanded, in circumstances still imperfectly known, just as it had begun to discuss the subject of reform (1424). The next council fell due at the expiration of seven years in 1431; Martin V duly convoked it for this date to the town of Basel and selected to preside over it the cardinal Julian Cesarini, a well-respected prelate. Martin himself, however, died before the opening of the synod.

== Council of Basel ==
The Council was seated on 14 December 1431, at a period when the conciliar movement was strong and the authority of the papacy weak. The Council at Basel opened with only a few bishops and abbots attending, but it grew rapidly and to make its numbers greater gave the lower orders a majority over the bishops. It adopted an anti-papal attitude, proclaimed the superiority of the Council over the Pope, and prescribed an oath to be taken by each new Pope. On 18 December Martin's successor, Pope Eugene IV, tried to dissolve it and open a new council on Italian soil at Bologna, but he was overruled.

The council was held in the Cathedral of Basel, where benches were placed for the 400 and more members, and general congregations were held either in the cathedral or in its chapter house. The clerks of ceremonies were Enea Silvio Piccolomini and Michel Brunout.

Sigismund, King of Hungary and titular King of Bohemia, had been defeated at the Battle of Domažlice in the fifth crusade against the Hussites in August 1431. Under his sponsorship, the Council negotiated a peace with the Calixtine faction of the Hussites in January 1433. Pope Eugene acknowledged the council in May and crowned Sigismund Holy Roman Emperor on 31 May 1433. The divided Hussites were defeated in May 1434. In June 1434, the pope had to flee a revolt in Rome and began a ten-year exile in Florence.

== Replacement by the Council of Florence ==
In 1438, Pope Eugene convened a new council at Ferrara, which however was transferred to Florence in 1439 because of the danger of plague at Ferrara and because Florence had agreed, against future payment, to finance the Council.

== Rump Council of Basel ==
Most of the original Council moved from Basel to Ferrara in 1438. Some remained at Basel, still claiming to be the Council. They elected Amadeus VIII, Duke of Savoy, as Pope Felix V. He is considered an antipope, and was the only claimant to the papal throne who ever took the Basel oath. Driven out of Basel in 1448, they moved to Lausanne. In 1449, Felix V resigned and the rump Council formally closed.

== Meeting in Florence ==
The Council had meanwhile successfully negotiated reunification with several Eastern Churches, reaching agreements on such matters as the Western insertion of the phrase "Filioque" to the Nicene-Constantinopolitan Creed, the definition and number of the sacraments, and the doctrine of Purgatory. Another key issue was papal supremacy, which involved the universal and supreme jurisdiction of the Bishop of Rome over the whole Church, including the national churches of the East (Serbian, Byzantine, Moldo-Wallachian, Bulgarian, Russian, Georgian, Armenian, Coptic, Syriac etc.), and secular matters such as the promise of military assistance against the Ottoman Empire.

On 6 July 1439, the union was proclaimed (in both Latin and Greek) in the document Laetentur Caeli ("Let the Heavens Rejoice"), which was signed by Pope Eugene IV and by the Byzantine Emperor John VIII Palaiologos. All but one of the bishops were present. Some Greek bishops, perhaps feeling political pressure from the Byzantine Emperor, reluctantly accepted the decrees of the Council. Other Eastern bishops did so out of sincere conviction, such as Isidore of Kiev, who subsequently suffered greatly for it. Among the Eastern bishops, Mark of Ephesus refused to accept the union, becoming the leader of the opposition back in Byzantium. A representative of the Georgian Orthodox Church, Gregory, Metropolitan of Tbilisi, who attended the council on behalf of David III, Catholicos-Patriarch of Georgia, shared the position of Mark of Ephesus and likewise refused to sign the decree of union. Bishop Isaiah of Stavropol likewise opposed the union and fled from Florence.

The Serbian Patriarch, Teofan I, did not even attend the council. The only Russian prelate present, Avraamy of Suzdal, signed the union, but Russian sources claimed that this was under duress from Metropolitan Isidore. The Russian Orthodox Church, upon learning of the union, angrily rejected it and ousted any prelate who was even remotely sympathetic to it, declaring itself autocephalous (i.e., autonomous), with subsequent Russian sources portraying the actions of Grand Prince Vasily II of Moscow as protecting the purity of the faith.

Despite the religious union, Western military assistance to Byzantium was ultimately insufficient, and the fall of Constantinople occurred in May 1453. The Council declared the Basel group heretics and excommunicated them, and affirmed the superiority of the Pope over the Councils in the bull Etsi non dubitemus of 20 April 1441.

The council also decided to terminate the dietary prohibition on Gentile converts to Christianity from consuming blood issued by the apostle James at the apostolic council of Jerusalem. This law although observed by the Eastern Orthodox Church, had been practically obsolete in the West since the popes' rejection of the Quinisext Council.

[The council] also declares that the apostolic prohibition, to abstain from what has been sacrificed to idols and from blood and from what is strangled, was suited to that time when a single church was rising from Jews and gentiles, who previously lived with different ceremonies and customs. This was so that the gentiles should have some observances in common with Jews, and occasion would be offered of coming together in one worship and faith of God and a cause of dissension might be removed, since by ancient custom blood and strangled things seemed abominable to Jews, and gentiles could be thought to be returning to idolatry if they ate sacrificial food. In places, however, where the Christian religion has been promulgated to such an extent that no Jew is to be met with and all have joined the church, uniformly practicing the same rites and ceremonies of the gospel and believing that to the clean all things are clean, since the cause of that apostolic prohibition has ceased, so its effect has ceased.

— Bull of Union with the Copts, 1442

== Composition ==
The democratic character of the assembly at Basel was a result of both its composition and its organization. Doctors of theology, masters and representatives of chapters, monks and clerks of inferior orders constantly outnumbered the prelates in it, and the influence of the superior clergy had less weight because instead of being separated into "nations", as at Constance, the fathers divided themselves according to their tastes or aptitudes into four large committees or "deputations" (deputationes). One was concerned with questions of faith (fidei), another with negotiations for peace (pacis), the third with reform (reformatorii), and the fourth with what they called "common concerns" (pro communibus). Every decision made by three "deputations" (the lower clergy formed the majority in each) received ratification for the sake of form in general congregation and, if necessary led to decrees promulgated in session. Papal critics thus termed the council "an assembly of copyists" or even "a set of grooms and scullions". However, some prelates, although absent, were represented by their proxies.

Nicholas of Cusa was a member of the delegation sent to Constantinople with the pope's approval to bring back the Byzantine emperor and his representatives to the Council of Florence of 1439. At the time of the council's conclusion in 1439, Cusa was 38 years old and thus, compared to the other clergy at the council, a fairly young man though one of the more accomplished in terms of the body of his complete works.

== Attempted dissolution ==
From Italy, France and Germany, the fathers came late to Basel. Cesarini devoted all his energies to the war against the Hussites until the disaster of Taus forced him to evacuate Bohemia in haste. Pope Eugene IV, Martin V's successor, lost hope that the council could be useful owing to the progress of heresy, the reported troubles in Germany, the war that had lately broken out between the dukes of Austria and Burgundy, and finally, the small number of fathers who had responded to the summons of Martin V. That opinion and his desire to preside over the council in person, induced him to recall the fathers from Germany, as his poor health made it difficult for him to go. He commanded the council to disperse, and appointed Bologna as their meeting place in eighteen months' time, with the intention of making the session of the council coincide with some conferences with representatives of the Orthodox Church of the Byzantine East, scheduled to be held there with a view to ecumenical union (18 December 1431).

That order led to an outcry among the fathers and incurred the deep disapproval of the legate Cesarini. They argued that the Hussites would think the Church afraid to face them and that the laity would accuse the clergy of shirking reform, both with disastrous effects. The pope explained his reasons and yielded certain points, but the fathers were intransigent. Considerable powers had been decreed to Church councils by the Council of Constance, which amid the troubles of the Western Schism had proclaimed the superiority, in certain cases, of the council over the pope, and the fathers at Basel insisted upon their right of remaining assembled. They held sessions, promulgated decrees, interfered in the government of the papal countship of Venaissin, treated with the Hussites, and, as representatives of the universal Church, presumed to impose laws upon the sovereign pontiff himself.

Eugene IV resolved to resist the Council's claim of supremacy, but he did not dare openly to repudiate the conciliar doctrine considered by many to be the actual foundation of the authority of the popes before the schism. He soon realized the impossibility of treating the fathers of Basel as ordinary rebels, and tried a compromise; but as time went on, the fathers became more and more intractable, and between him and them gradually arose an impassable barrier.

Abandoned by a number of his cardinals, condemned by most of the powers, deprived of his dominions by condottieri who shamelessly invoked the authority of the council, the pope made concession after concession and ended on 15 December 1433 with a pitiable surrender of all the points at issue in a papal bull, the terms of which were dictated by the fathers of Basel, that is, by declaring his bull of dissolution null and void and recognising that the synod as legitimately assembled throughout. However, Eugene IV did not ratify all the decrees coming from Basel, nor make a definite submission to the supremacy of the council. He declined to express any forced pronouncement on this subject, and his enforced silence concealed the secret design of safeguarding the principle of sovereignty.

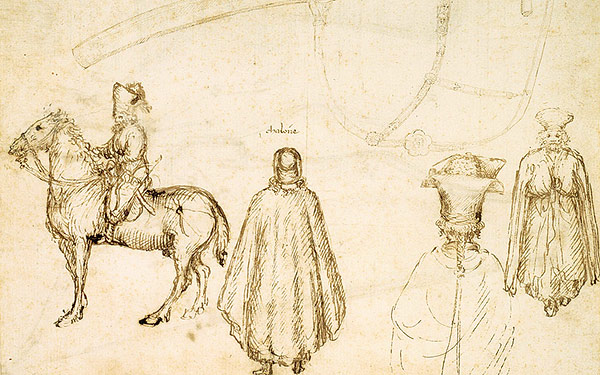
Sketches by Pisanello of the Byzantine delegation at the Council

The fathers, filled with suspicion, would allow only the legates of the pope to preside over them on condition of their recognizing the superiority of the council. The legates submitted the humiliating formality but in their own names, it was asserted only after the fact, thus reserving the final judgment of the Holy See. Furthermore, the difficulties of all kinds against which Eugene had to contend, such as the insurrection at Rome, which forced him to escape by means of the Tiber, lying in the bottom of a boat, left him at first little chance of resisting the enterprises of the council.

== Issues of reform ==
Emboldened by their success, the fathers approached the subject of reform, their principal object being to further curtail the power and resources of the papacy. They took decisions on the disciplinary measures that regulated the elections, on the celebration of divine service and on the periodical holding of diocesan synods and provincial councils, which were usual topics in Catholic councils. They also made decrees aimed at some of the assumed rights by which the popes had extended their power and improved their finances at the expense of the local churches. Thus the council abolished annates, greatly limited the abuse of "reservation" of the patronage of benefices by the Pope and completely abolished the right claimed by the pope of "next presentation" to benefices not yet vacant (known as gratiae expectativae). Other conciliar decrees severely limited the jurisdiction of the court of Rome and even made rules for the election of popes and the constitution of the Sacred College. The fathers continued to devote themselves to the subjugation of the Hussites, and they also intervened, in rivalry with the pope, in the negotiations between France and England, which led to the treaty of Arras, concluded by Charles VII of France with the duke of Burgundy. Also, circumcision was deemed to be a mortal sin. Finally, they investigated and judged numbers of private cases, lawsuits between prelates, members of religious orders and holders of benefices, thus themselves committing one of the serious abuses for which they had criticized the court of Rome.

== Papal primacy ==
The Council clarified the Latin dogma of papal primacy:

"We likewise define that the holy Apostolic See, and the Roman Pontiff, hold the primacy throughout the entire world; and that the Roman Pontiff himself is the successor of blessed Peter, the chief of the Apostles, and the true vicar of Christ, and that he is the head of the entire Church, and the father and teacher of all Christians; and that full power was given to him in blessed Peter by our Lord Jesus Christ, to feed, rule, and govern the universal Church."

== Eugene IV's eastern strategy ==
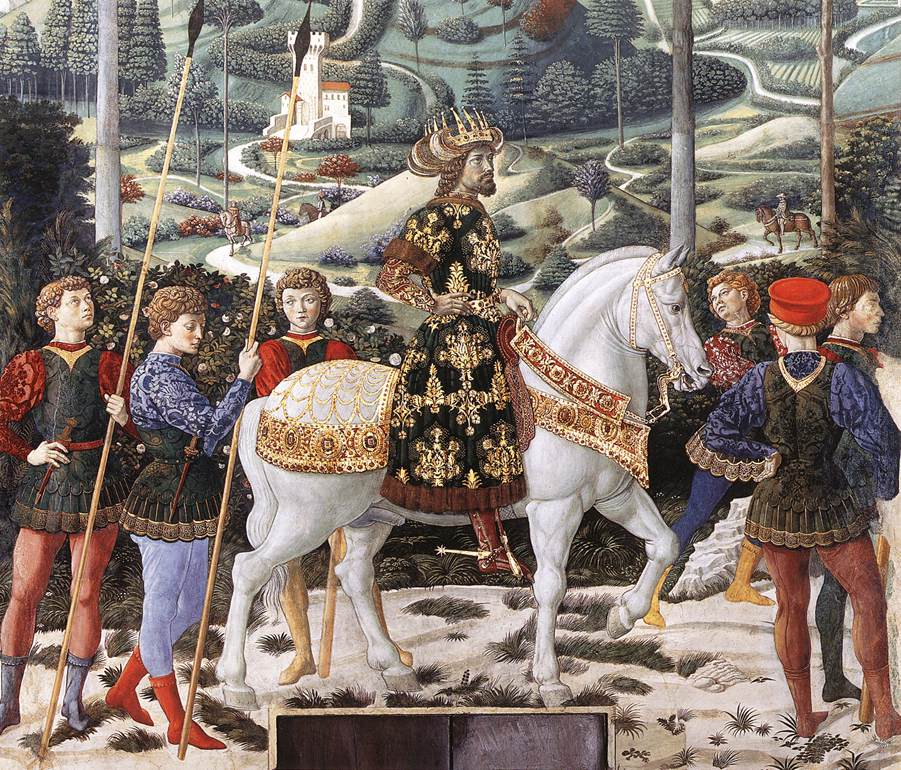
A figure in Benozzo Gozzoli's 1459 Journey of the Magi is assumed to portray John VIII Palaiologos.

Eugene IV, however much he may have wished to keep on good terms with the fathers of Basel, found himself neither able nor willing to accept or observe all their decrees. The question of the union with the Byzantine church, especially, gave rise to a misunderstanding between them which soon led to a rupture. The Byzantine emperor John VIII Palaiologos, pressed hard by the Ottoman Turks, was keen to ally himself with the Catholics. He consented to come with the principal representatives of the Byzantine Church to some place in the West where the union could be concluded in the presence of the pope and of the Latin council. There arose a double negotiation between him and Eugene IV on the one hand and the fathers of Basel on the other. The council wished to fix the meeting place at a place remote from the influence of the pope, and they persisted in suggesting Basel, Avignon or Savoy. On the other hand, the Byzantines wanted a coastal location in Italy for their ease of access by ship.

== Council transferred to Ferrara and attempted reunion with the Eastern Orthodox Church ==
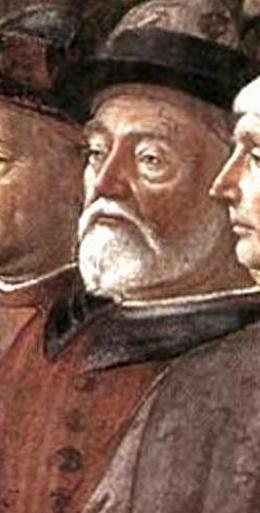
John Argyropoulos was a Greek Byzantine diplomat who attended the Council of Florence in 1439.

As a result of negotiations with the East, Emperor John VIII Palaiologos accepted Pope Eugene IV's offer. By a bull dated 18 September 1437, Pope Eugene again pronounced the dissolution of the Council of Basel and summoned the fathers to Ferrara in the Po Valley.

The first public session at Ferrara began on 10 January 1438. Its first act declared the Council of Basel transferred to Ferrara and nullified all further proceedings at Basel. In the second public session (15 February 1438), Pope Eugene IV excommunicated all who continued to assemble at Basel.

In early April 1438, the Byzantine contingent, over 700 strong, arrived at Ferrara. On 9 April 1438, the first solemn session at Ferrara began, with the Eastern Roman Emperor, the Patriarch of Constantinople and representatives of the Patriarchal Sees of Antioch, Alexandria and Jerusalem in attendance and Pope Eugene IV presiding. The early sessions lasted until 17 July 1438 with each theological issue of the East–West Schism (1054) hotly debated, including the Processions of the Holy Spirit, the Filioque clause in the Nicene Creed, purgatory, and papal primacy. Resuming proceedings on 8 October 1438, the Council focused exclusively on the Filioque matter. Even as it became clear that the Byzantine Church would not consent to the Filioque clause, the Byzantine Emperor continued to press for a reconciliation.

Initially, the seating arrangements were meant to feature the pope in the middle with the Latins on one side and Greeks on the other, but the Greeks protested. It was decided to have the altar with the open Bible in the center of the one end of the chamber, and the two high ranking delegations facing each other on the sides of the altar, while the rest of the delegations were below further in chamber. The Byzantine Emperor's throne was opposite that of the Holy Roman Emperor (who never attended), while the Patriarch of Constantinople faced opposite a cardinal, and the other high-ranking cardinals and bishops faced the Greek metropolitans. The throne of the pope was set slightly apart and higher.

== Council transferred to Florence and the near East–West union ==
With finances running thin and on the pretext that the plague was spreading in the area, both the Latins and the Byzantines agreed to transfer the council to Florence. Continuing at Florence in January 1439, the Council made steady progress on a compromise formula, known as "ex filio".

In the months to follow, an agreement was reached on the Western doctrine of Purgatory and a return to the pre-schism prerogatives of the papacy. On 6 July 1439, an agreement (Laetentur Caeli) was signed by all the Eastern bishops but one, Mark of Ephesus, delegate for the Patriarch of Alexandria, who, contrary to the views of all others, held that Rome continued in both heresy and schism.

To complicate matters, Patriarch Joseph II of Constantinople had died the previous month. The Byzantine Patriarchs were unable to assert that ratification by the Eastern Church could be achieved without a clear agreement of the whole Church.

Upon their return, the Eastern bishops found their attempts toward agreement with the West broadly rejected by the monks, the general populace, and by civil authorities (with the notable exception of the Emperors of the East who remained committed to union until the fall of the Byzantine Empire to the Turkish Ottoman Empire in 1453). Facing the imminent threat, the Union was officially proclaimed by Isidore of Kiev in Hagia Sophia on 12 December 1452.

The Emperor, bishops and people of Constantinople accepted this act as a temporary provision until the removal of the Ottoman threat. Yet, it was too late: on 29 May 1453 Constantinople fell. To prevent the Eastern Orthodox Christians from seeking military assistance from the Catholic states of Europe, the Ottoman Sultans appointed anti-unionists into high church-positions, who justified the Ottoman conquest as divine punishment for the Byzantine emperors decision to pursue unity with heretics (meaning, the Catholic Church). The union signed at Florence remained, and remains, unimplemented by the Orthodox Churches.

=== Copts and Ethiopians ===
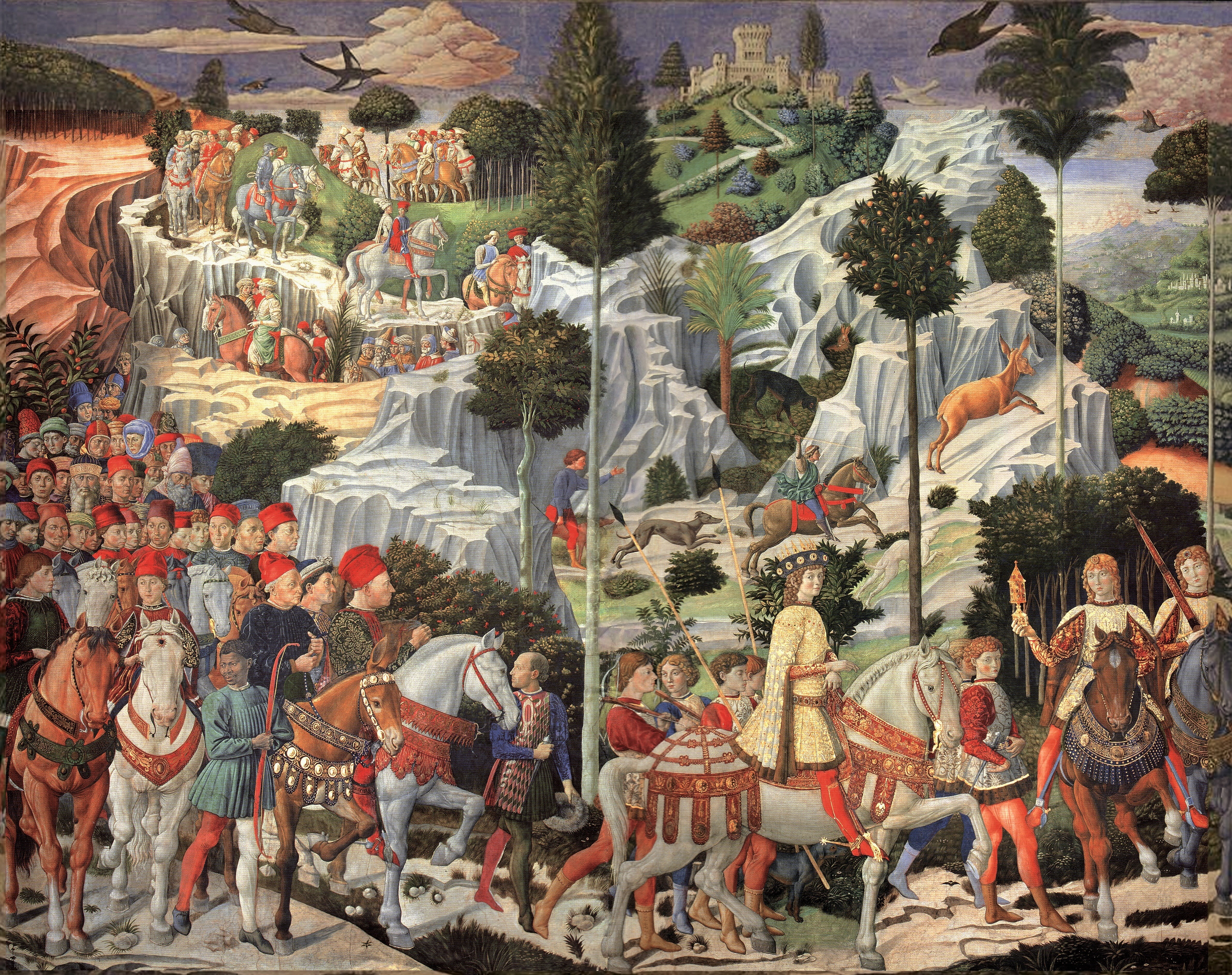
The multinational character of the Council inspired Benozzo Gozzoli's 1459 Journey of the Magi, featuring a black figure in the attendance.

The Council soon became even more international. The signature of this agreement for the union of the Latins and the Byzantines encouraged Pope Eugenius to announce the good news to the Coptic Christians, and invite them to send a delegation to Florence. He wrote a letter on 7 July 1439, and to deliver it, sent Alberto da Sarteano as an apostolic delegate. On 26 August 1441, Sarteano returned with four Ethiopians from Emperor Zara Yaqob and Copts. A contemporary observer described the Ethiopians saying "They were black men and dry and very awkward in their bearing." At that time, Rome had delegates from a multitude of nations, from Armenia to Russia, Greece and various parts of north and east Africa.

== Deposition of Eugene IV and schism at Basel ==
During this time the council of Basel, though nullified at Ferrara and abandoned by Cesarini and most of its members, persisted nonetheless, under the presidency of Cardinal Aleman. Affirming its ecumenical character on 24 January 1438, it suspended Eugene IV. The council went on (in spite of the intervention of most of the powers) to pronounce Eugene IV deposed (25 June 1439), giving rise to a new schism by electing (4 November 1439) Duke Amadeus VIII of Savoy, as (anti)pope, who took the name Felix V.

=== Effects of the schism ===
This schism lasted fully ten years, although the antipope found few adherents outside of his own hereditary states, those of Alfonso V of Aragon, of the Swiss confederation and of certain universities. Germany remained neutral; Charles VII of France confined himself to securing to his kingdom (by the Pragmatic Sanction of Bourges, which became law on 13 July 1438) the benefit of a great number of the reforms decreed at Basel; England and Italy remained faithful to Eugene IV. Finally, in 1447, Frederick III, Holy Roman Emperor, after negotiations with Eugene, commanded the burgomaster of Basel not to allow the presence of the council any longer in the imperial city.

=== Schism reconciled at Lausanne ===
In June 1448 the rump of the council migrated to Lausanne. The antipope, at the insistence of France, ended by abdicating (7 April 1449). Eugene IV died on 23 February 1447, and the council at Lausanne, to save appearances, gave their support to his successor, Pope Nicholas V, who had already been governing the Church for two years. Trustworthy evidence, they said, proved to them that this pontiff accepted the dogma of the superiority of the council as defined at Constance and at Basel.

== Aftermath ==
The struggle for East–West union at Ferrara and Florence, while promising, never bore fruit, largely due to the activities of Mark of Ephesus. While progress toward union in the East continued to be made in the following decades, all hopes for a proximate reconciliation were dashed with the fall of Constantinople in 1453, when Ottoman Sultan Mehmed II appointed the strongly anti-unionist Gennadius Scholarius as the Patriarch of Constantinople.

In 1443, the Orthodox Patriarchs of Jerusalem, Alexandria, and Antioch held a council in Jerusalem where they condemned the union.

Perhaps the council's most important historical legacy was the lectures on Greek classical literature given in Florence by many of the delegates from Constantinople, including the Neoplatonist Gemistus Pletho. These greatly helped the progress of Renaissance humanism.

== See also ==
- Compacts of Basel
- Ecclesiastical differences between the Catholic Church and the Eastern Orthodox Church
- Theological differences between the Catholic Church and the Eastern Orthodox Church
- Valori (family)
- Symbolism of domes

== Sources ==
=== Primary sources ===
- Mansi, Gian Domenico (ed.). Sacrorum Conciliorum nova et amplissima collectio. Vol. 29–31 (nova ed.).
- Aeneas Sylvius Piccolomini (1803). De rebus Basileae gestis. Fermo.
- Monumenta Conciliorum generalium seculi XV, Scriptorum. Vol. 1–3. Vienna. 1857–1895.
- Sylvester Syropoulos (1971). Laurent, V. (ed.). Mémoires. Concilium Florentinum: Documenta et Scriptores. Vol. 9. Rome.

=== Secondary literature ===
- Rayfield, Donald (2012). Edge of Empires: A History of Georgia. London: Reaktion Books. ISBN 978-1780230306.
- Geanakoplos, Deno J. (1955). "The Council of Florence (1438–9) and the Problem of Union between the Byzantine and Latin Churches". Church History. 24: 324–346.
- Geanakoplos, Deno J. (1989). Constantinople and the West. Madison, Wisconsin. pp. 224–254.
- Dezhnyuk, Sergey F. (2017). Council of Florence: The Unrealized Union. CreateSpace.
- Gieseler, J. C. L. (1853). Ecclesiastical History. Vol. 4. Edinburgh. pp. 312ff.
- Gill, Joseph (1964). Personalities of the Council of Florence and Other Essays. Oxford.
- Haller, Johannes, ed. (1896–1904). Concilium Basiliense. Vol. 1–5. Basel.
- Hefele, Karl Josef von (1874). Conciliengeschichte (in German). Vol. 7. Freiburg-im-Breisgau.
- Harris, Jonathan (2010). The End of Byzantium. New Haven and London. ISBN 978-0-300-11786-8.
- Harris, Jonathan (1995). Greek Emigres in the West c. 1400–1520. Camberley. pp. 72–84.
- Helmrath, Johannes (1987). Das Basler Konzil; 1431–1449; Forschungsstand und Probleme (in German). Cologne.
- Kolditz, Sebastian (2013–2014). Johannes VIII. Palaiologos und das Konzil von Ferrara-Florenz (1438/39). Vol. 1–2. Stuttgart: Anton Hiersemann Verlag. ISBN 978-3-7772-1319-4.
- McManus, Stuart M. (2008–2009). "Byzantines in the Florentine polis: Ideology, Statecraft and Ritual during the Council of Florence". Journal of the Oxford University History Society. 6. Archived from the original on 2009-04-20.
- Lazaris, Stavros (2007). "L'empereur Jean VIII Paléologue vu par Pisanello lors du concile de Ferrare–Florence". Byzantinische Forschungen (in French). 29: 293–324.
- Nicol, Donald M. (1993). The Last Centuries of Byzantium, 1261–1453 (2nd ed.). Cambridge. pp. 306–317, 339–368.
- Pérouse, Gabriel (1904). Le Cardinal Louis Aleman, président du concile de Bâle (in French). Paris.
- Richter, Otto (1877). Die Organisation and Geschäftsordnung des Basler Konziis (in German). Leipzig.
- Sudmann, Stefan (2005). Das Basler Konzil: Synodale Praxis zwischen Routine und Revolution (in German). Frankfurt-am-Main. ISBN 3-631-54266-6. Archived from the original on 2009-01-08.
- Frantzi, Georgiou (2004). Constantinople has Fallen: Chronicle of the Fall of Constantinople. Translated by Ioannis A. Melisseidis and Poulcheria Zavolea Melisseidou. Includes Ioannis A. Melisseidis, Brief History of Events in Constantinople during the period 1440–1453. Athens: Vergina Asimakopouli Bros. pp. 105–119. ISBN 9607171918.
- Andrić, Stanko (2016). "Saint John Capistran and Despot George Branković: An Impossible Compromise". Byzantinoslavica. 74 (1–2): 202–227.

Attribution

- Fennell, John (14 January 2014) [1995]. A History of the Russian Church to 1488. Routledge. ISBN 978-1-317-89720-0 – via Google Books.
