= Saint Sophia Cathedral, Vologda =

Russian Orthodox cathedral in Vologda, Vologda Oblast, Russia

Saint Sophia Cathedral
- Софийский собор (Russian)
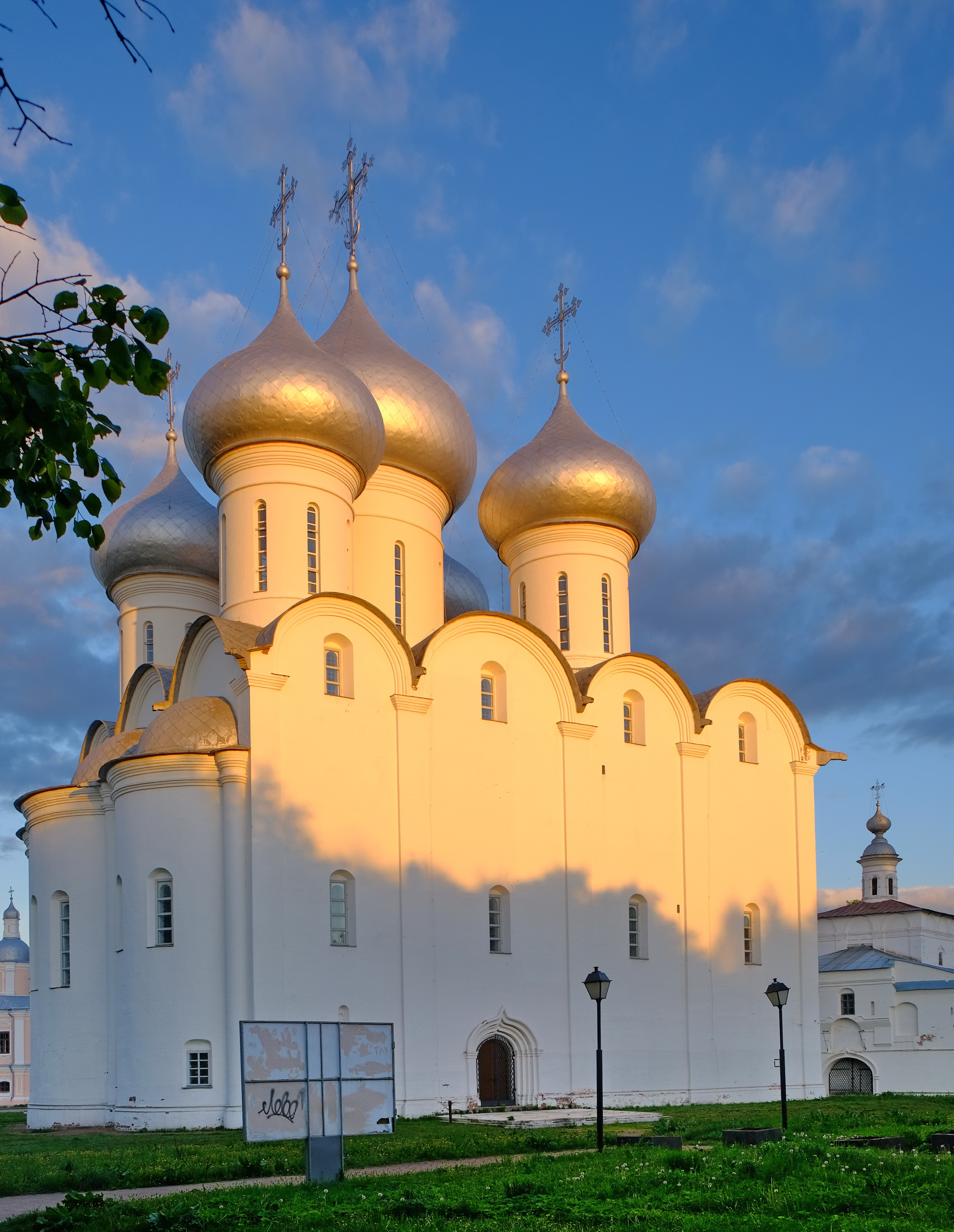
- The cathedral in summer 2021

Religion
- Affiliation: Russian Orthodox
- Governing body: Diocese of Vologda

Location
- Location: Vologda, Russia
- Interactive map of Saint Sophia Cathedral
- Coordinates: 59°13′28″N 39°52′57″E

Architecture
- Style: Moscow school
- Completed: 1568-1570

Website
- kafsobor35.cerkov.ru

Saint Sophia Cathedral (Russian: Софийский собор) is the oldest surviving building in the city of Vologda and the main church of the Vologda Eparchy of the Russian Orthodox Church. It was constructed between 1568 and 1570 at the behest of Ivan the Terrible who had made Vologda the centre of his personal demesne (known as the Oprichnina). The cathedral is located on the right bank of the Vologda River, just outside the former citadel known as the Vologda Kremlin.

The cathedral is noted for remarkable preservation of its 17th-century wall paintings and for its elaborately carved Baroque icon screen. It is listed as an architectural monument of federal significance (#3510063013).

== History ==
The cathedral was built in 1568–1570, after Ivan IV of Russia had introduced the Oprichnina (with Vologda as its administrative centre). Like most other provincial cathedrals, it was said to be patterned after the Dormition Cathedral in the Moscow Kremlin, although in fact its design hearkens back to the Dormition Cathedral in Rostov, the seat of the local bishopric. In terms of size and height, it was one of the largest churches built in the Tsardom of Russia up to that point.

If local traditions are to be believed, Ivan personally supervised the construction. The tsar also, for unknown reason, ordered the cathedral's unusual orientation: its altar apse does not face east as is common in churches but rather northeast. In 1571, Ivan unexpectedly left Vologda and returned to Moscow. Soon afterwards, he abolished the Oprichnina and never showed any further interest in Vologda. The cathedral's decoration was completed during the reign of Ivan's son Feodor who finally had the church consecrated in 1587.

A legend says that, before leaving Vologda, Ivan gave an order for the cathedral to be demolished (the likely reason being that, during his visit to the construction site, a brick fell on his head). He later changed his mind and withdrew the order. The church's dedication to the Holy Wisdom (Sophia) is interpreted as Vologda's declaration of independence from Novgorod (where the main church has the same dedication).

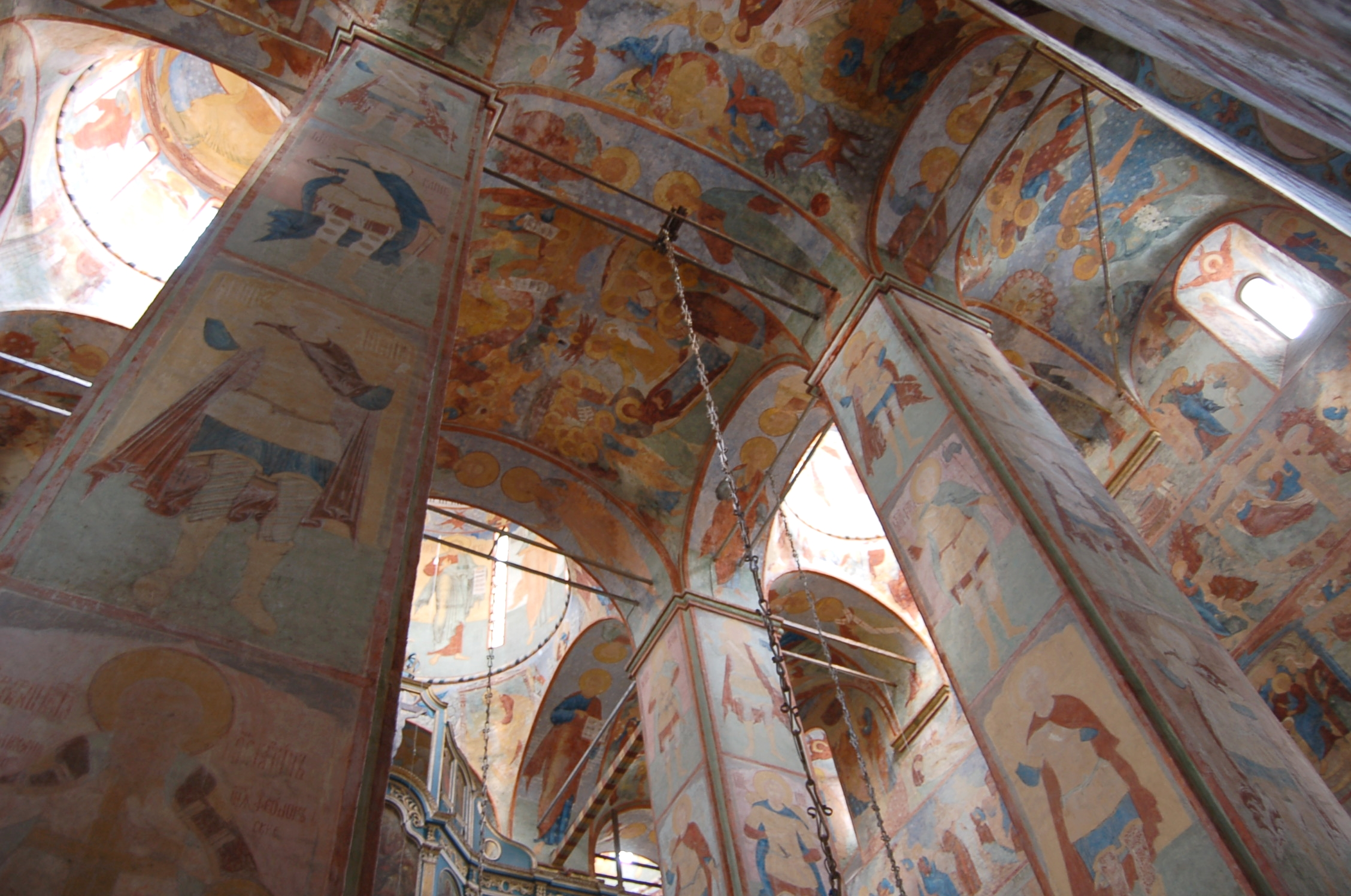
The interior was frescoed in the 1680s

The cathedral boasts one of the few completely preserved pre-Petrine fresco cycles. The interior walls were painted between 1685 and 1687 by a group of painters from Yaroslavl under the direction of Dmitry Plekhanov. Russia's largest fresco of The Last Judgment covers the entire west wall (some 400 sq m). The carved icon screen was set up between 1737 and 1741.

The Sophia Cathedral was deemed too large to be heated properly in wintertime, so a smaller "winter" cathedral was built nearby in the 1770s. It was dedicated to the feast of Christ's Resurrection. Until 1928, this church contained the 14th-century icon of the Holy Trinity with the oldest extant inscription in the Permic script.

In Soviet times, the Sophia Cathedral was shut down and now it serves as a museum. All recent additions (mostly dating from the 19th century) were removed in a restoration campaign lasting from 1958 to 1968.

== Architecture ==
The cathedral has six cross-shaped pillars and five heavy tin-clad onion domes. The silver color of the domes matches that of the Rostov Cathedral and is typical for the Russian North. The exterior walls are almost devoid of decoration — a trait shared with some 16th-century Novgorod churches (such as the Tikhvin katholikon). The church's height is said to be 59 meters.

== Bell tower ==
The cathedral campanile (free-standing bell tower), at 78 metres (256 ft) high, has been the highest building in Vologda since the 17th century. The first wooden bell-tower on the site was built at the end of the 16th century. Between 1654 and 1659, it was replaced with the new octagonal brick building. Its upper tier was fancifully Gothicized in 1869 by Vladimir Schildknecht, the chief architect of Vologda Governorate, at the bidding of Bishop Palladius.

Following the pattern of the cathedral belfry in Rostov, every bell has its own name. The Big Holiday Bell was cast in 1687, the Water Carrier Bell was cast in 1643, the Watch Bell was cast in 1627, the Archangel Bell was cast in 1689, the Big Swan Bell was cast in 1689, and the Little Swan Bell was cast in 1656. The Bell-tower also served as a watch tower (primarily to spot fires in the mostly wooden town). The clock was manufactured by the Brothers Gutenop factory in Moscow in 1871. The observation deck has the best panoramic view of the downtown.

== See also ==
- 16th-century Western domes
