= Valori family =

15th-century Florentine family

The Valori family lived in Florence during the Italian Renaissance. They were prominent in Florentine politics for five generations.

== Chapel at San Procolo ==
The family had a chapel in San Procolo, containing Crucifixion by the artist Filippino Lippi. The high altar there was painted by Giotto.

== Bartolemeo di Filippo ==
Bartolemeo di Filippo was born on 31 August 1436. Filippo was on friendly terms with Lorenzo di Medici, and funded Ficino's translation of Plato after the Pazzi conspiracy of 1478. Correspondence written prior to 2 June 1484 shows Ficino reporting that Filippo is having the corpus of Plato published at his own expense.

He was a student of Traversari.

He was a principal member of the Council of Florence.

== Francesco ==
Francesco was born in 1438 and studied at the Platonic academy of Florence. He married a lady from the Canigiani family. He served as ambassador for Florence, and was Gonfalonieri di Guistizia four times. He was initially a supporter of the Medici, but upon the death of Lorenzo il Magnifico in 1492, and despite his oligarchic aristocratic leanings, he drew closer to the partisans of Savonarola. This brought him into conflict with the partisans of the Medici, and as part of the Republican government, Francesco pronounced death sentences on some prominent aristocrats linked to an unsuccessful plot to return Piero de' Medici to power, including Lorenzo Tornabuoni, Bernardo del Nero, G. Pucci, G. Cambi, and Niccolo Ridolfi. He had extracted some of this evidence through the torture of Lamberto Dell'Antélla. These acts gained him enmity and with the fall of the Savonarola rule in April 1498, he was arrested, but murdered near the San Procolo chapel on route to his jailing at the Signoria by Vincenzio Ridolfi.

== Niccolò ==
Niccolò was born in 1464 and died in 1526. He wrote a history of Lorenzo de' Medici, father to Pope Leo X. He was a nephew of Francesco.

== Sources ==
- Tomas, Natalie R. (2003). The Medici Women: Gender and Power in Renaissance Florence. Aldershot: Ashgate. ISBN 0754607771.
