= Profession of the supreme pontiff (Council of Basel) =

Catholic decree

The Council of Basel decreed, in its 23rd session (26 March 1436) that anyone elected Pope should make, as a condition for his election to be valid, the "profession of the supreme pontiff", a formula declaring recognition of the Council as a "General Council" that it drew up specifically for that purpose.

What the formula that each cardinal, meeting in conclave, was called upon to swear, declaring: "I shall not make obeisance to anyone elected as pontiff before he takes the oath prescribed by this council of Basel", refers to as an oath must be this profession of faith.

No Pope actually made the Council's profession of faith apart from the Pope that the Council itself created, Felix V, who is not included in the list of popes, but only in that of Antipopes.
