= Abraham of Suzdal =

Russian bishop (died after 1448)

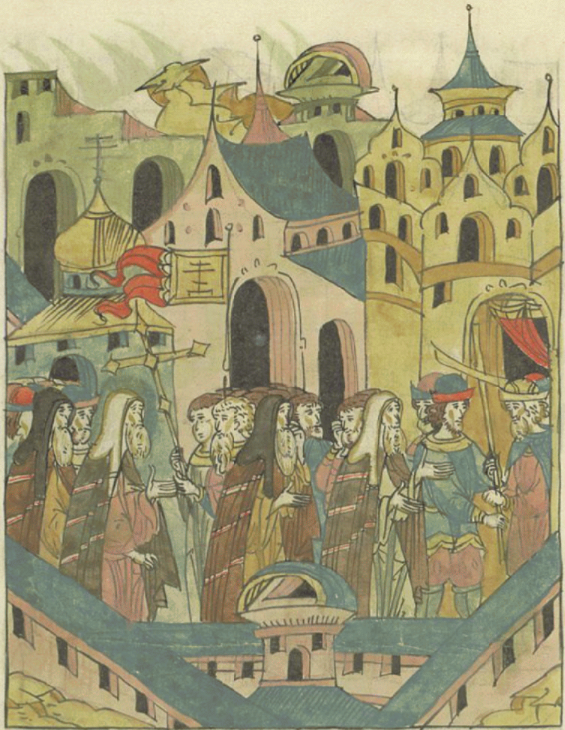
Abraham in the retinue of Metropolitan Isidore, miniature from the Illustrated Chronicle of Ivan the Terrible (16th century)

Abraham (Russian: Авраамий, romanized: Avraamy; died after 1448) was the bishop of Suzdal from 1431. He was one of the participants in the Russian embassy to the Council of Florence in 1439.

== Life ==
Abraham became the bishop of Suzdal in 1431. Information about his life is scarce; prior to this, he may have been the abbot of the Monastery of Saint Euthymius.

He took part in the Council of Florence in 1439. He was in the retinue of Metropolitan Isidore. Abraham also brought along the monk Simeon, who wrote his polemical Tale of the Council of Florence, as well as other scribes, one of whom was likely the anonymous author of the Journey to the Council of Florence, which was the earliest known Russian description of Western Europe.

Abraham was the only Russian prelate present and he signed the union, but, according to Simeon, this was only under duress. In his Tale of the Council of Florence, Simeon says that Abraham "did not wish [to sign], but Metropolitan Isidor arrested him and gaoled him for a whole week. Then he signed under constraint."

Following his return to Russia, he was a participant in the bishops' council of 1441 that condemned the union. He also wrote The Procession of Abraham of Suzdal to the Eighth Council with Metropolitan Isidore in the Year 6945, which has survived in at least 18 copies dating to the 16th–18th centuries.

In 1448, he participated in the ordination of Jonah as metropolitan of the Russian Church.

== Sources ==
- "Авраамий, епископ суздальский" . Brockhaus and Efron Encyclopedic Dictionary (in Russian). 1906.
- Fennell, John (14 January 2014) [1995]. A History of the Russian Church to 1488. Routledge. ISBN 978-1-317-89720-0.
- Rhyne, George N.; Lazzerini, Edward J., eds. (2000). "Avraamii of Suzdal". The Supplement to the Modern Encyclopedia of Russian, Soviet and Eurasian History. Vol. 3. Gulf Breeze, Fl: Academic International Press. p. 10. ISBN 978-0-87569-142-8.
- Turilov, A. A. (2000). "Авраамий". Православная энциклопедия. Т. I: А — Алексий Студит (in Russian). Moscow: Православная энциклопедия. pp. 166–167. ISBN 5-89572-006-4.
