= Serapion of Vladimir =

Blessed Serapion of Vladimir (died 1275) was the bishop of Vladimir.

== Life ==
He was archimandrite of the Kiev Monastery of the Caves from 1247 to 1274, and then the bishop of Vladimir, Suzdal and Nizhny Novgorod from 1274 until his death the following year.

The territory of the diocese at the time consisted of the Grand Principality of Vladimir, including the principalities of Gorodets, Kostroma, Moscow, Pereslavl, Starodub, Suzdal, Nizhny Novgorod and Yuryev.

Five sermons by Serapion have been preserved. His main theme is the disaster of the Mongol invasion, seen as divine punishment for Russia because if its people's sins.

Four of the sermons appear to have been written in 1274–1275, when he was bishop. The fifth is presumably older, and was most likely written shortly after the destruction of Kiev in 1240. In one of his late sermons, he denounces the persecution of witches.

He is commemorated on 12 July (25 July N. S.).

== Sources ==
- "Серапион, епископ владимирский" . Brockhaus and Efron Encyclopedic Dictionary (in Russian). 1906.
- "Serapion of Vladimir" in The Oxford Dictionary of Byzantium (1991)
- "Serapion of Vladimir (1275)" in The Oxford Dictionary of the Middle Ages (2010)
