= Ignatius Deputatov =

Russian Orthodox Metropolitan of Volgograd Oblast

- Bishop of Saratov and Volsky
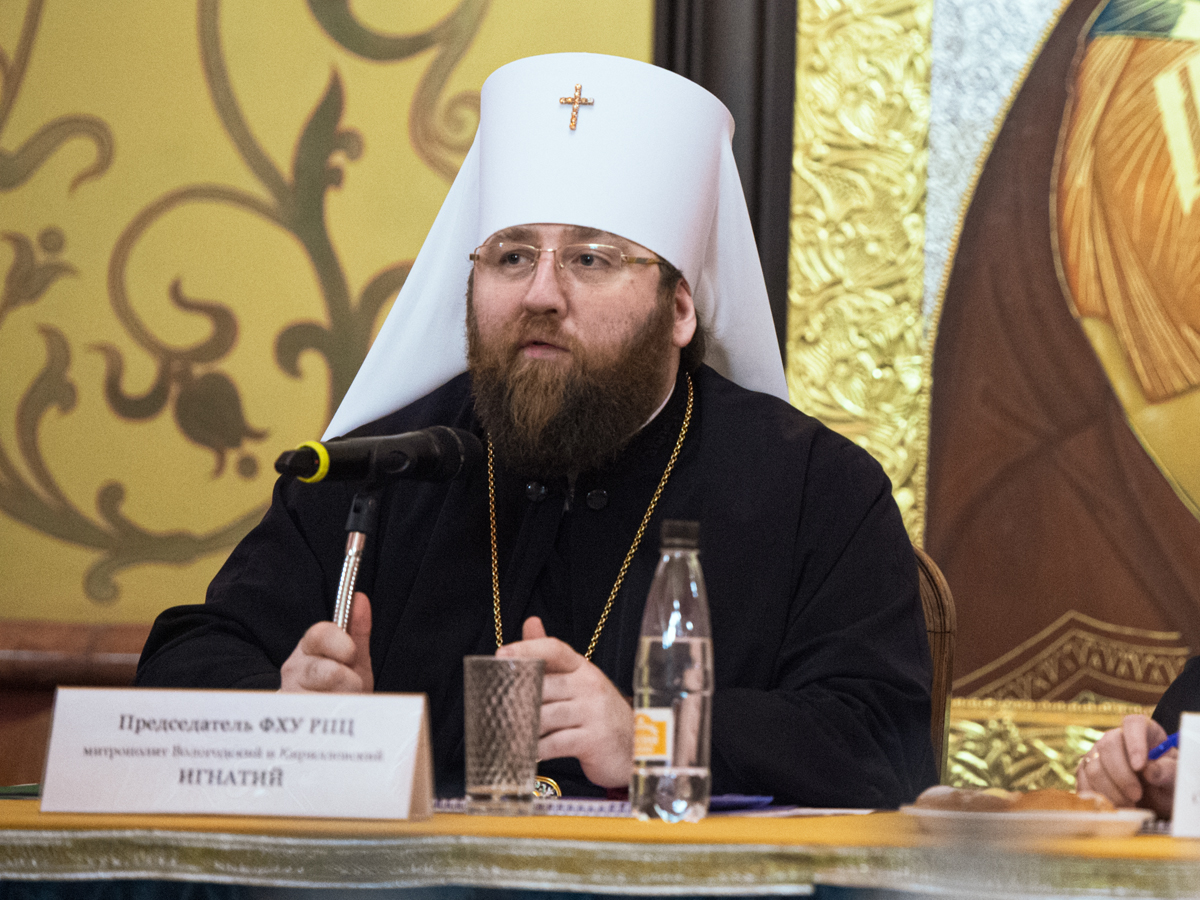
- Bishop Ignatius in 2020
- Native name: Игнатий
- Church: Russian Orthodox Church
- Metropolis: Patriarchal Exarchate in Western Europe
- Diocese: Diocese of Saratov and Volsky
- Appointed: 25 August 2020
- Successor: Incumbent

Orders
- Ordination: 31 October 2002 (deacon); 27 October 2002 (Tonsured); 21 August 2011 (Bishop)
- Rank: Bishop

Personal details
- Born: Alexei Mikhailovich Deputatov; January 22, 1977 (age 49) Tugoles village, Shatursky District, Moscow Oblast, Soviet Union
- Denomination: Eastern Orthodox Church

Metropolitan Ignatius (Deputatov) (Russian: Игнатий (Депутатов), secular name Alexei Mikhailovich Deputatov, Russian: Алексе́й Миха́йлович Депута́тов; born 22 January 1977), is a Metropolitan of the Russian Orthodox Church. He presently holds the title of "Bishop of Saratov and Volsky" as well as being the head of the Saratov Metropolitanate.

== Early life ==
Deputatov was born on 22 January 1977 in a working-class family in the village settlement of Tugoles, Shatursky District, Moscow Oblast. Although his father was an Orthodox Priest, early in his life Deputatov was uninterested in religious life, being more interested in pursuing a career in music. He graduated from Shatura high school in 1978. In his early 20s Deputatov started to consider the religious life once again and entered the Ryazan Theological School.

== Academic life ==
From 1994 to 1996 he studied at the Ryazan Theological School. From 1994 to 1998 he attended the Samara Theological Seminary. In the same year he entered the Saint Petersburg Theological Academy, and on 22 November 1998 he was appointed to the role of lector by the rector of the academy, Constantine (Gorianov).

In June 2002 he defended his thesis at SPbDA on the topic "Fundamentals of the social concept of the Russian Orthodox Church in the light of the Holy Scriptures of the New Testament." In August 2002, he was appointed a teacher of the subject "Biblical History" at the Ryazan Theological School.

On 23 July 2003, he was appointed by Archbishop Pavel of Ryazan as the vice-rector for educational work of the Ryazan Theological School. Starting in September 2003 he was a professor of the subjects "Pastoral Theology", "Homiletics" and "Fundamentals of the Social Concept of the Russian Orthodox Church."

== Religious life ==
On 27 October 2002, in the church of the Holy Apostle and Evangelist John the Theologian of the Ryazan Theological School, Deputatov tonsured with the name Ignatius by Simon (Novikov), the metropolitan of Ryazan and Kasimov, in honor of the Soviet-era martyr Ignatius (Sadkovsky).

On 31 October 2002, in the church of St. Lazarus the Righteous in the city of Ryazan, Metropolitan Simon ordained him a hierodeacon, and on November 4 of the same year in the Nikolsky church in the city of Skopin, Ryazan region, he became a hieromonk.

== Bishop ==
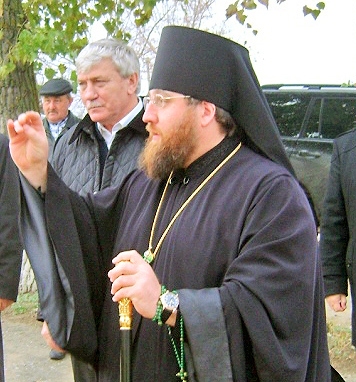
Ignatius (Deputatov) in 2013

On 27 July 2011, by the decision of the Holy Synod, he was elected Bishop of Shakhtinsky and Millerovsky. On 18 August 2011, during a divine service in the Cathedral of Christ the Savior, Patriarch Kirill elevated him to the rank of archimandrite. On 21 August 21, in the Transfiguration Cathedral of the Novospassky Monastery, he was ordained Bishop of Shakhty and Millerovo, which was performed by Patriarch Kirill, Metropolitan Juvenal (Poyarkov) of Krutitsky and Kolomna, Metropolitan Barsanuphius (Sudakov) of Saransk and Mordovia, Archbishop Arsenius (Epifanov) of Istra, Archbishop Paul (Ponomaryov) of Ryazan and Kasimov, Archbishop Alexis (Frolov) of Kostroma and Galich, Bishop Mercurius (Ivanov) of Rostov and Novocherkassk, Bishop Ignatius (Punin) of Bronnitsy, Bishop Sergius (Chashin) of Solnechnogorsk, Bishop Tikhon (Zaitsev) of Podolsk, and Bishop Sabbas (Mikheyev) of Voskresensk.

On 27 December 2011, he was relieved of his post as governor of the Transfiguration Monastery in Ryazan. On 26 December 2012, he was approved as the priest archimandrite of the Pokrovsky Verkhnemakeevsky monastery of the village of Verkhne-Makeevka, Rostov region.

On 30 May 2014, by the decision of the Synod, he was appointed Bishop of Vologda and Veliky Ustyug.

On 25 July 2014, he was approved as the priest archimandrite of the Spaso-Prilutsky Monastery in Vologda and the Kirillo-Belozersky Monastery in Kirillov.

During his tenure as metropolitan of Vologda and Veliky Ustyug the number of active parishes in the Vologda Metropolitanate increased from 168 (as of 30 May 2014) to 327 (as of 14 March 2018). The number of active monasteries increased from four (as of 30 May 2014) to eight (as of 14 March 2018), and the number of clerics increased from 117 (as of 30 May 2014) to 227 (as of 14 March 2018).

On 26 February 2019 Ignatius replaced Mark (Golovkov) in the patriarchal administration of the Russian Orthodox church. Along with the resignation of the metropolitan of St. Petersburg, this was seen by some observers and journalists as part of an ongoing trend of Kirill removing old bishops mostly ordained and appointed by his predecessor and replacing them with younger bishops who reflect his personality and views.

On 25 August 2020, by the decision of the Holy Synod, he was appointed the Metropolitan of Saratov and Volsk, the head of the Saratov Metropolitanate, with the dismissal of his previous posts. On 28 August 2020, he celebrated the last Divine Liturgy at the Saint Sophia Cathedral in Vologda, co-served with his successor, Metropolitan Sabbas (Mikheev). On 20 November 2020, he was approved as the priest archimandrite of the Spaso-Preobrazhensky monastery in Saratov, and on 29 December 2020 as the priest archimandrite of the St. Nicholas monastery also in Saratov.

Eastern Orthodox Church titles
Preceded by Longin (Korchagin)	Metropolitan of Saratov and Volsk; 25 August 2020 —	Succeeded by Incumbent
Preceded by Mark (Golovkov)	Chairman of the Financial and Economic Department of the Moscow Patriarchate; 25 February 2019 – 25 August 2020	Succeeded by Paramon (Golubka)
Preceded by Maximilian (Lazarenko)	Metropolitan of Vologda and Kirillov; 30 March 2015 — 25 August 2020	Succeeded by Sabbas (Mikheyev)
Preceded by Pitirim (Krylov)	Temporary manager of the Diocese of Veliky Ustyug; 23 October 2014 – 2 May 2017	Succeeded by Tarasius (Perov)
Preceded by diocese created	Bishop of Shakhty and Millerovo; 21 August 2011 – 30 May 2014	Succeeded by Simon (Morozov)
