= Diocese of Vladimir (Russian Orthodox Church) =

Eparchy of the Russian Orthodox Church

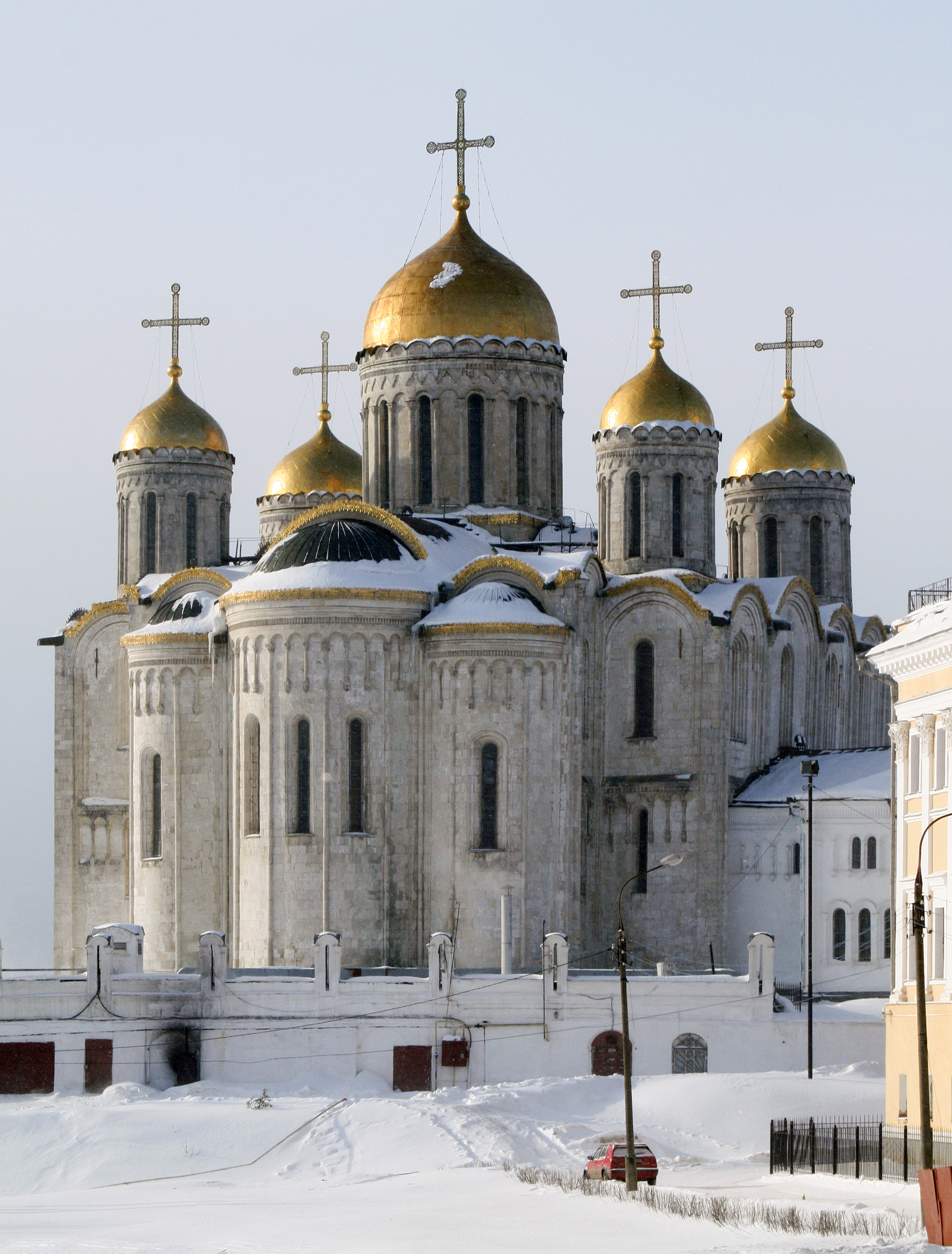
- Dormition Cathedral

Location
- Headquarters: Vladimir

Information
- Denomination: Eastern Orthodox
- Sui iuris church: Russian Orthodox Church
- Established: 1213
- Language: Old Church Slavonic
- Governance: Eparchy

Website
- www.eparh33.ru

The Diocese of Vladimir (Russian: Владимирская епархия) is an eparchy of the Russian Orthodox Church centered in Vladimir Oblast, Russia. The main cathedral of the diocese is the Assumption Cathedral in the Cathedral Square of Vladimir.

As of 1 January 2006, 28 monasteries were in the eparchy (13 male and 15 female), including 13 metochions and sketes, as well as around 300 parishes. The ruling bishop from November 11, 1990 until 2018 was Eulogius (Smirnov), Metropolitan of Vladimir. He died on 22 July 2020.

== History ==
The Christianization of the Rostov-Suzdal region began, apparently in 990, demonstrated by Christian burials in the region.

In the 1160s, Prince Andrey Bogolyubsky tried to establish the Metropolitate of Vladimir, independent from Kiev and led by Theodore the White Klobuchok, but the Patriarch Luke Chrysoberges of Constantinople rejected his plan. An attempt took place soon after Andrei Bogoliubski brought from the Mezhyhirya Monastery near Kiev the icon of Theotokos of Vladimir in 1155. However the Vladimir diocese was created in 1214 when the Grand Prince of Vladimir George Vsevolodovich separated it from the Rostov diocese (today known as Diocese of Yaroslavl and Rostov).

Originally the title of bishop was "Suzdal and Vladimir". The first bishop of the newly formed Diocese of Simon was Svyatitel Simon (Simon the Baptist), known as the author of eight stories about the Crypt monks set out in the letters to the Kiev-Pechersk monk Polycarp. They laid the foundation of the Kiev-Pechersk patericon - the first collection of the Lives of Russian saints. Simon died in 1226 and was buried in the Cathedral of the Assumption.

The next bishop was rector of Nativity Vladimir Mitro. The Tatar-Mongol invasion came during the reign of Vladimir. In 1237, the Golden Horde troops of Batu Khan wiped out Ryazan and in February 1238 came close to Vladimir. The city was captured and looted, its residents killed or taken prisoner. Bishop Mitrofan and his family were killed within the walls of the grand Cathedral of the Assumption, which was badly damaged by fire.

Archimandrite was consecrated Bishop of Kiev-Pechersk Monastery Serapion. The bishop received the title of "Vladimir, Suzdal and Nizhny Novgorod". The territory of the diocese then consisted of the Grand Duchy of Vladimir and principalities of Gorodetsky, Kostroma, Moscow, Pereslavsky, Starodubskiy, Suzdal with Nizhny Novgorod and Tartu.

Since 1299, most of the territory of the modern Vladimir diocese was part of the Metropolitan Region (from 1589 - Patriarchal area since 1721 - Synod area) Muromskaya land was under the control of Ryazan bishops. In 1347, on the lands of Suzdal-Nizhny Novgorod principality, Suzdal diocese was formed.

On 16 July 1744, Moscow accepted Vladimir diocese, called Vladimir and Yaropolskoy. From 1786-1788, the Vladimir and Suzdal dioceses merged.

== Bishops ==
=== Vladimir and Suzdal ===
- 1214 - May 22, 1226 - Simon
- March 14, 1227 - February 7, 1238 - Mitrofan

=== Suzdal, Vladimir and Pereslavl-Zalesskie ===
- 1238-1240 - Kirill Bishop of Rostov
- mention 1240 — Euphrosynus I
- 1250-1274 — Kirill II of Kiev

=== Vladimir, Suzdal and Nizhny Novgorod ===
April 1274 — July 12, 1275 — Serapion of Vladimir

- 1276-1286 — Theodore
- Bishop of Vladimir of Suzdal — Jacob (1288-1295)[5]
- 1295 — April 18, 1300 — Simeon
- April 18, 1300 — December 6/12, 1305 — Maximos. From this time on, Vladimir became the de facto center of the entire metropolitanate of All Russia. Beginning in 1303, separate metropolitanates were periodically created in the southwestern territories.
- 1308-1325 — Peter

=== Suzdal ===
- March 1330-1347 — Daniel
- 1340-1347 — John
- August 6, 1347-1351 — Nathanael
- 1350-1351 — Daniel (second term)
- 1351-1363 — John again (second term)
- 1363-1365 — Alexy (Byakont)
- 1365-1366 — John the (third term)
- 1366-1373 — Alexy (Byakont) (second term)

=== Suzdal, Nizhny Novgorod and Gorodets ===
- February 11, 1374 — October 15, 1385 — Dionysius
- March/June 1389 — March 25, 1406 — Euphrosynus II

=== Suzdal and Tarusa ===
- September 9, 1406-1427 — Mitrofan
- 1427-1431 — Gregory I
- 1431-1452 — Abraham
- 1452 — November 11, 1464 — Philip I
- November 1464-1484 — Euthymius, Bishop of Chernigov: information about Feodor, former Bishop of Chernigov, who occupied the Suzdal See in 1483, cannot be considered reliable
- December 9, 1484 — March 8, 1508 — Nifont
- August 21, 1509 — November 21, 1515 — Simeon (Stremoukhov-Bezborody)
- February 10, 1517 — March 23, 1531 — Gennady (Bogoyavlensky)
- March 9, 1539 — February 25, 1543 — Ferapont
- February 21, 1544-1548 — Jonah (Sobina)
- March 10, 1549-1551 — Trifon (Stupishin)
- 1566 — Afanasy (Paletsky) (June 18, 1551 — August 11, 1564)
- 1564-1567 — Eleutherius
- 1567 — November 26, 1570 — Paphnutius
- 1570-1571 v/u — Savvaty
- 1571 — Gregory II
- 1571-1586 — Varlaam
- 1587-1594 — Job
- 1594 — July 2, 1609 — Galaktion
- March 1613 — February 20, 1615 — Gerasim
- 1615 — April 13, 1626 — Arseny Elassonsky
- August 1626 — March 22, 1634 — Iosif Kurtsevich
- October 5 1634 — February 25, 1653 — Serapion
- January 29, 1654 — September 13, 1654 — Sophronius
- 1655 — April 1656 — Joseph
- August 10, 1656-1658 — Filaret
- May 2, 1658-1661 — Stefan

=== Suzdal and Yuryev ===
- 1666 — July 2/12, 1679 — Stefan Paki
- March 21/31, 1680 — September 6, 1681 — Markell
- September 6, 1681 — November 1681 — Paul (Moravian)
- December 11/21, 1681 — February 28, 1705 — Hilarion of Suzdal
- August 24, 1708 — March 18, 1712 — Ephraim (Jankovic) Pyatitserkovny Serb
- September 7, 1712 — January 25, 1719 — Ignatius (Smola)
- May 31, 1719 — July 5, 1723 — Varlaam (Lenitsky)
- October 11, 1725 — March 16, 1726, April 22, 1726 — April 13, 1731 — Joachim (Vladimirov)
- November 24, 1731 — September 17, 1735 — Gabriel (Russky)
- September 17, 1735 — October 10, 1737 — Afanasy (Paussius-Kondoidi)
- 1737-1739 — Veniamin (Falkovsky), named
- November 21, 1739 — December 15, 1747 — Simon (Tikhomirov)
- May 30, 1748 — October 9, 1755 — Porfiry (Kraisky)
- October 9 1755 — May 20, 1760 — Sylvester (Glovatsky)
- December 13, 1760 — April 11, 1775 — Gennady (Dranitsyn)
- May 19, 1775 — April 4, 1786 — Tikhon (Yakubovsky)

=== Vladimirsky and Yaropolsky ===
- March 20, 1748 — April 16, 1757 — Platon (Petrunkevich)
- November 23, 1757 — December 16, 1762 — Antony (Bagrationi)

=== Vladimirsky and Muromsky ===
- July 6, 1763 — August 9, 1770 — Pavel (Grebnevsky)
- December 25, 1770 — August 3, 1783 — Ieronim (Formakovsky)
- September 22, 1783 — May 6, 1788 — Victor (Onisimov)

=== Suzdalsky and Vladimir ===
- May 6, 1788 — October 16, 1799 — Victor (Onisimov)
- Vladimir and Suzdal
- October 16, 1799 — February 24, 1800 — Victor (Onisimov)
- February 24, 1800 — July 3, 1821 — Xenophon (Troepolsky)
- August 21, 1821 — February 25, 1850 — Parfeny (Chertkov)
- February 25, 1850 — July 22, 1863 — Justin (Mikhailov)
- July 22, 1863 — June 17, 1866 — Feofan (Govorov)
- June 17, 1866 — April 29, 1878 — Antony (Pavlinsky)
- December 9, 1878 — November 21, 1892 — Feognost (Lebedev)
- November 21, 1892 — November 20, 1904 — Sergius (Spassky)
- November 27, 1904 — June 9, 1906 — Nikon (Sofia)
- June 23, 1906 — July 13, 1914 — Nikolai (Nalimov)

=== Vladimirsk and Shuisky ===
- July 20, 1914 — August 10, 1917 — Alexy (Dorodnitsyn)
- May 18 — August 9, 1917 v/u — Evgeny (Mertsalov), Bishop of Yuryev
- August 10, 1917 — June 16, 1922 — Sergei Stragorodsky

=== Vladimir ===
- 1922-1923, one month in 1926 acting — Korniliy (Sobolev), Bishop of Vyaznikovsky; the second time — Bishop of Vladimir-Suzdal
- 1923 — December 10, 1925 — Nikolay (Dobronravov)
- November — December 9, 1925; February 2, 1926 — May 1927 (acting) — Damian (Voskresensky), Bishop of Pereslavl-Zalessky
- May — September 1927 (acting) — Nifont (Fomin), Bishop of Vyaznikovsky
- 1928 (acting) — Makariy (Zvezdov), Bishop of Murom
- December 31, 1928 — ? (acting) — Pavel (Galkovsky), Bishop of Yegoryevsk
- August 13, 1930 — May 8, 1931 (acting) — Guriy (Stepanov), Archbishop of Suzdal
- 1931 (acting) — Pavel (Borisovsky), Metropolitan of Yaroslavl
- May 31, 1932 — February 18, 1935 — Innocent (Letyaev)
- February 18, 1935 — May 1936 — Sergiy (Grishin)
- May — September 9, 1936 — Philip (Gumilyevsky)
- August 11, 1936 — February 3, 1937 — Feodor (Yakovtsevsky)
- March 30 — September 14, 1937 (acting) — Chrysogon (Ivanovsky), Bishop of Yuryev-Polsky
- September 14, 1937-1938 — Alexy (Sergeev)

=== Vladimir and Suzdal ===
- August 27, 1944 — October 31, 1970 — Onisim (Festinatov)
- October 31 — December 1, 1970 v/u — John (Wendland), Metropolitan of Yaroslavl
- December 1, 1970 — April 16, 1975 — Nikolai (Kutepov)
- April 17, 1975 — April 24, 1980 — Vladimir (Kotlyarov)
- April 24, 1980 — May 11, 1987 — Serapion (Fadeyev)
- May 12, 1987 — October 27, 1990 — Valentin (Mishchuk)
- November 11, 1990 — December 28, 2018 — Eulogius Smirnov
- December 28, 2018 — December 27, 2024 — Tikhon (Emelyanov)
- Since December 27, 2024 - Nikandr Pilishin
