= Eulogius Smirnov =

Russian Orthodox bishop (1937–2020)

- Metropolitan of Vladimir and Suzdal
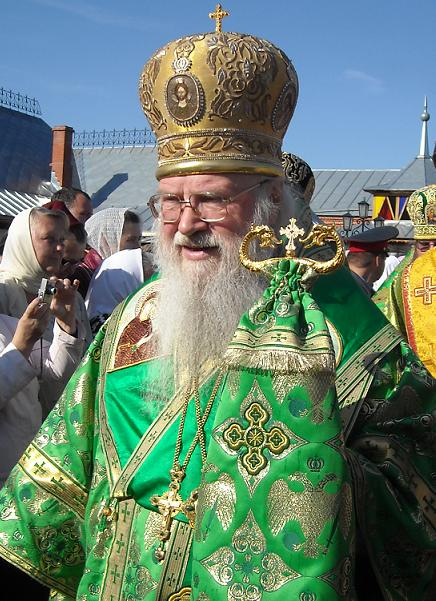
- Bishop Eulogius in 2009
- Native name: Евло́гий
- Church: Russian Orthodox Church
- Diocese: Eparchy of Vladimir

Orders
- Ordination: 15 March 1965 (tonsure); 21 March 1965 (deacon); 11 November 1990 (Bishop consecration)
- Rank: Metropolitan

Personal details
- Born: Yuri Vasilyevich Smirnov; 13 January 1937 Kemerovo, Russian SFSR, Soviet Union
- Died: 22 July 2020 (aged 83) Moscow, Russia
- Denomination: Eastern Orthodox Church

Eulogius (Russian: Евлогий, born Yuri Vasilyevich Smirnov, Russian: Юрий Васильевич Смирнов; 13 January 1937 – 22 July 2020) was a Russian Orthodox prelate at the Diocese of Vladimir between 1990 and 2018. Since 2014 Eulogius was a Doctor of Theology, and in 2006 became an honorary citizen of the city of Vladimir.

== Early life ==
Smirnov was born in Kemerovo into a working-class family. His father was a plumber, while his mother was a cook. The family had seven sons and three daughters, for which their mother was awarded the honorary title "Mother Heroine".
