= Diocese of Saratov =

Diocese of Saratov and Volsk
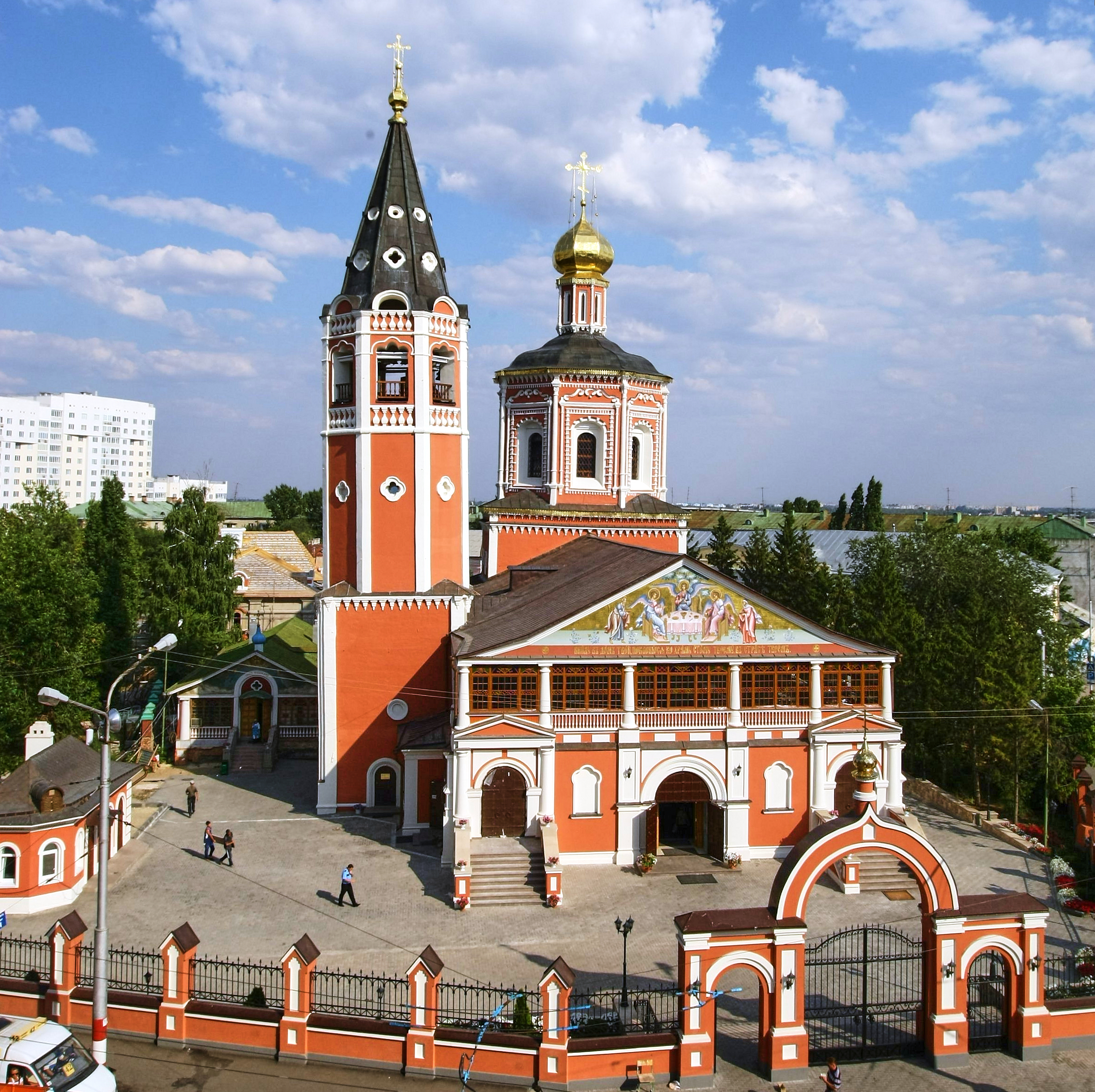
- Church of the Protection of the Theotokos in Saratov

Location
- Deaneries: 15
- Headquarters: Saratov

Statistics
- Parishes: 190

Information
- Denomination: Eastern Orthodox
- Sui iuris church: Russian Orthodox Church
- Established: October 16, 1799
- Cathedral: Holy Trinity Cathedral
- Language: Old Church Slavonic

Current leadership
- Governance: Eparchy
- Bishop: Ignatius Deputatov since 25 August 2020

Website
- www.eparhia-saratov.ru

Diocese of Saratov (Russian: Саратовская и Вольская епархия) is an eparchy of the Russian Orthodox Church based in Saratov. The eparchy's cathedral is the Cathedral of the Holy Trinity in Saratov.

== History ==
On October 16, 1799, the independent Saratov and Penza diocese was separated from Tambov. However, “due to the lack of convenient premises for bishops and a spiritual consistory in Saratov,” the first bishop of the new see, Gaiy (Tokaov), achieved the move of the see to Penza and in 1803 the name of the diocese was changed to Penza and Saratov.

The Secret Committee on Cases of Dissenters drew special attention of Emperor Nicholas I to the strengthening of the schism in the Saratov Oblast, as a result of which the sovereign ordered on October 20, 1828 to restore an independent department in Saratov. The Holy Synod decided on October 21 that the Saratov diocese should be third-class (after Penza), called Saratov and Tsaritsyn, and that the new bishop should initially reside in the Saratov Transfiguration Monastery. On November 3 of the same year, the decision of the Synod was approved by the emperor.

After the October Revolution, persecution of the Church began, reaching its peak in the 1930s. By the end of the 1930s, there was not a single functioning church left in the Saratov diocese; most of the clergy were either shot or were in camps and exile.

During wartime, church-government relations began to gradually change, but the bishop appointed to Saratov in 1941, after a four-year break, could not arrive in his cathedral city, since there were no functioning churches either in it or in the Saratov Oblast. The revival of church life in the diocese began in the fall of 1942.

By the decision of the Holy Synod of October 5–6, 2011, the Diocese of Balashov and Diocese of Pokrov were separated from the Saratov diocese.

== Deaneries ==
The diocese is divided into 15 church districts:

- Atkar Deanery - Priest Roman Bolotnov
- Bazarno-Karabulak Deanery - Priest Nikolai Protasov
- Baltai Deanery - Priest Vadim Derzhavin
- Volsk deanery - Archpriest Alexy Zemtsov
- Resurrection Deanery - Priest Sergius Tuigin
- Novoburas deanery - priest John Kovach
- Petrovsky Deanery - Priest Sergiy Protasov
- Saratov Eastern Deanery - Priest Alexander Borodovitsyn
- Saratov Northern Deanery - Priest Oleg Grushin
- Saratov Western Deanery - Priest Dimitry Lazutin
- Saratov Southern Deanery - Archpriest Alexander Domrachev
- Saratov Central Deanery - Priest Alexander Chebotarev
- Tatishchevsky deanery - priest Alexy Novichkov
- Khvalynsk deanery - Archpriest Pavel Usov
- Deanery of the monasteries - Hieromonk Seraphim (Baranov)

== Bishops ==
- Gaius (Takaov) (October 16, 1799 – December 4, 1803)
- Moses (Bogdanov-Antipov-Platonov): November 29, 1828 – March 12, 1832
- Jacob (Vecherkov): March 27, 1832 – January 13, 1847
- Athanasius (Drozdov): January 13, 1847 – April 15, 1856
- Joannicius (Gorski): April 15, 1856 – July 17, 1860
- Euthymius (Belikov): August 29, 1860 – October 17, 1863
- Joannicius (Rudnev): January 13, 1864 – July 13, 1873
- Tikhon (Pokrovsky): July 13, 1873 – March 6, 1882
- Paul (Wilczynski): April 5, 1882 – December 16, 1889
- Abraham (Letnitsky): December 16, 1889 – October 24, 1893
- Nicholas (Nalimov): November 13, 1893 – January 16, 1899
- John (Kratirov): January 16, 1899 – March 12, 1903
- Hermogenes (Dolganov): March 21, 1903 – January 17, 1912
- Alexis (Dorodnitsyn): January 17, 1912 – July 30, 1914
- Palladium (Dobronravov): July 30, 1914 – August 25, 1917
- Dosifej (Protopopov): August 25, 1917 – October 27, 1927
- Andrew (Komarov): January 14, 1924 – March 6, 1926
- Thaddeus (Uspensky): October 27, 1927 – 1928
- Seraphim (Alexandrov): June 15, 1928 – August 11, 1933
- Athanasius (Malinin): August 11, 1933 – September 30, 1935
- Seraphim (Silichev): September 30, 1935 – 1936
- Benjamin (Kuznetsov) (September 23, 1936 – October 1937)
- Andrew (Komarov) (December 9, 1941 – May 28, 1942 and July 13 – August 14, 1942)
- Gregory (Chukov): October 14, 1942 – May 26, 1944
- Paisius (Obraztsov) (February 14, 1945 – January 13, 1947)
- Boris (Vik): January 13, 1947 – March 4, 1949
- Philip (Stavitsky): October 21, 1949 – December 12, 1952 (with the title of "Astrakhan and Saratov")
- Gurias (Yegorov): January 28, 1953– July 1954
- Benjamin (Milov): February 4, 1955 – August 2, 1955
- Job (Kresovich): 1955
- Benjamin (Fedchenkov): November 28, 1955 – February 20, 1958
- Palladius (Sherstennikov): February 20, 1958 – May 29, 1963
- Bartholomew (Gondarovsky): May 29, 1963 – December 22, 1964
- Pimen (Kmielevsky): January 10, 1965 – December 10, 1993
- Nectarius (Korobov): March 26, 1994 – November 19, 1994
- Alexander (Timofeyev): July 18, 1995 – January 7, 2003
- Sergeius (Poletkin): January 7, 2003 – August 19, 2003
- Longin (Korchagin) (August 19, 2003 - August 25, 2020)
- Ignatius (Deputatov) (since August 25, 2020)

== Former names ==
- Saratov and Penza (16.X.1799 - 4.XII.1803)
- Penza and Saratov (4.XII.1803 - 3.XI.1828)
- Saratov and Tsaritsyn (3.XI.1828 -?)
- Saratov and Astrakhan (?)
- Saratov and Petrovsk (1917-1923)
- Saratov (1923-1937; 1941-1943)
- Saratov and Stalingrad (1943-1944)
- Saratov and Volsk (1945-1953)
- Saratov and Stalingrad (1953-1954)
- Saratov and Volsk 1954
- Saratov and Balashov (1954 - 26.XII.1957)
- Saratov and Volsk (26.XII.1957 - 15.VII.1959)
- Saratov and Stalingrad (15.VII.1959 - 1961)
- Saratov and Volgograd (1961 - 31.I.1991)
- Saratov and Volskaya (31.I.1991 - 05.X.2011)
- Saratov (from 06.10.2011)
