= Diocese of Vologda =

Eparchy of the Russian Orthodox Church

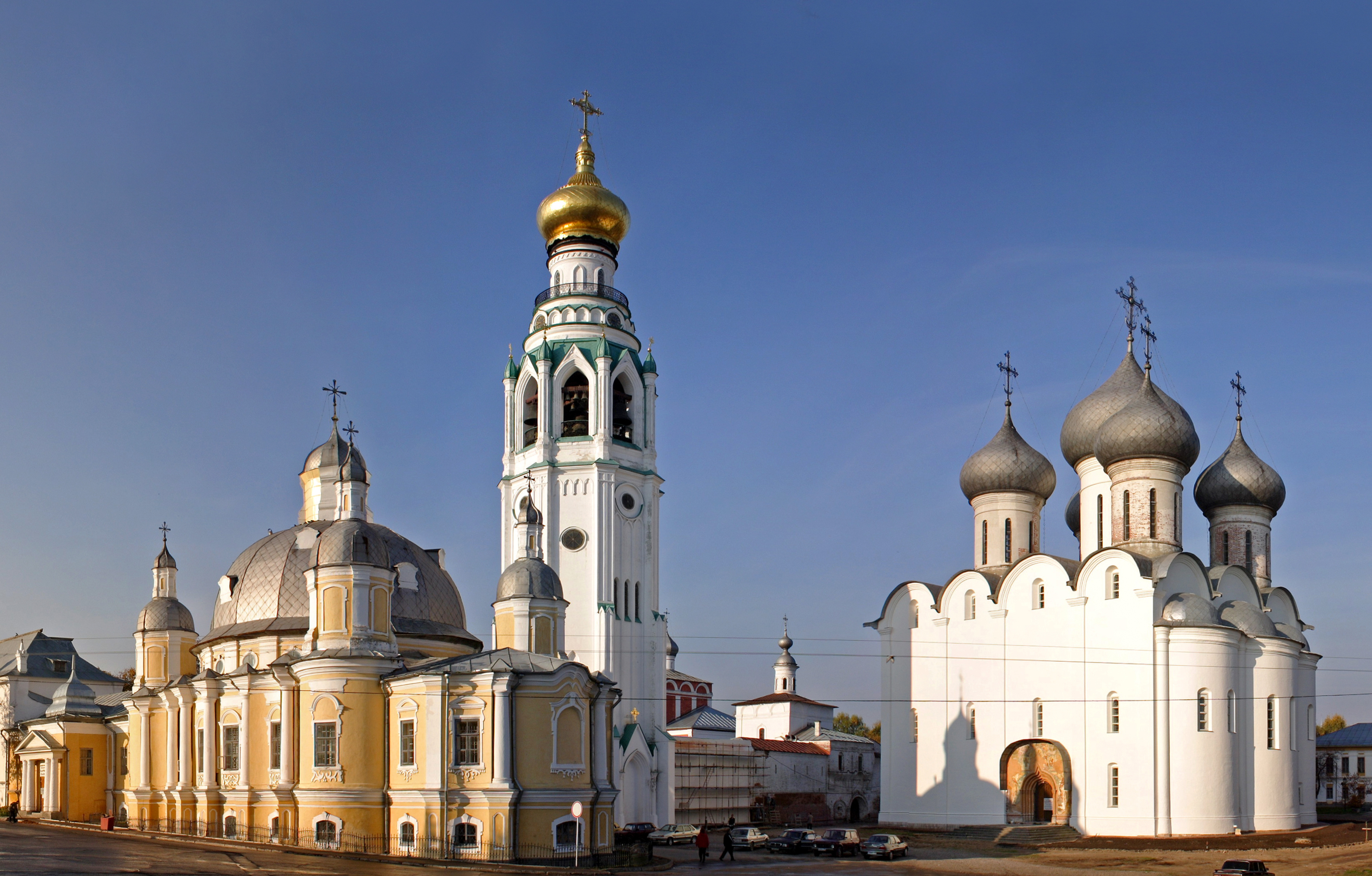
- Former Cathedrals of the Vologda Diocese. From left to right: Resurrection Cathedral, bell tower of St. Sophia Cathedral. In the background, the Bishops yard with churches

Location
- Headquarters: Vologda

Information
- Denomination: Eastern Orthodox
- Sui iuris church: Russian Orthodox Church
- Established: 1556
- Language: Old Church Slavonic
- Governance: Eparchy

Website
- vologda-mitropolia.ru

Diocese of Vologda (Russian: Вологодская епархия) is an eparchy of the Russian Orthodox Church.

== History ==
Prior to the establishment of the Vologda diocese of north-western region of her was part of the Novgorod diocese, and the south and the east - in the Rostov diocese. In 1492, the Archbishop of Novgorod Gennady gave the Perm' diocese, Vologda, and the bishops were called Perm and Vologda. By order of the cathedral in 1589 the department was transferred to Vologda, and the bishops were called Vologda and Velikopermskimi.

In the last decades of the eighteenth century the boundaries of dioceses have been aligned with the boundaries of the provinces. Several areas of the Vologda epaohii caught in Kostroma, Tver, Novgorod, Arkhangelsk Oblast, dioceses have moved accordingly.

Modern borders took shape after the formation of the diocese in 1937 and the restoration of the Vologda region in 1945 (after the Great Purge) of the diocesan administration.

=== Former names ===
Vologda and Velikopermskaya (from 1556) Vologda and Beloezerskaya (from December 1657) Velikoustyuzhsk and Totemskoe (from summer 1682) Vologda (since March 1787) Vologda and Veliky (since 06/05/1788) Vologda and Totemskoe (since 01/30/1888) Vologda and Cherepovets (1945) Vologda and Veliky Ustyug (since 1965)

== List of bishops ==
- Joasaph I (1558-1570)
- Macarius (1568-1574)
- Barlaam I (1576-1584)
- Anthony (October 11, 1585 - October 26, 1587)
- Jonah (Dumin) (June 1588 – 1603)
- Joasaph II (December 1603 - the above. May 1609)
- Sylvester (July 1611 - July 11, 1613)
- Nectarius the Greek (June 25, 1613 – 1616)
- Macarius (9 February 1617 - 22 July 1619)
- Cornelius (February 6, 1620 - March 17, 1625)
- Nectarius the Greek (May 1625 - June 3, 1626)
- Barlaam II (8 October 1626 - January 1645)
- Marcel (16 January 1645 - 22 March 1663)
- Simon (23 October 1664 - August 1684)
- Gabriel (Kichigin) (7 September 1684 - 30 March 1707)
- Joseph (17 October 1708 - 18 January 1716)
- Paul (Vasiliev) (January 29, 1716 - November 5, 1725)
- Joachim (March 16 - April 22, 1726)
- Athanasius (Paussius-Kondoidi) (9 October 1726 - 17 September 1735)
- Ambrose (Yushkevich) (2 February 1736 - 29 May 1740)
- Pimen (Savyolov) (29 June 1740 - 26 May 1753)
- Serapion (Lyatoshevich) (29 October 1753 - December 1761)
- Joseph (Zolotov) (16 December 1761 - 25 December 1774)
- Irenaeus (Bratanovsky) (26 April 1775 - 23 April 1796)
- Arseny (Todorsky) (August 15, 1796 - June 15, 1802)
- Anthony (Znamensky) (5 July 1802 - 13 February 1803)
- Theophylact (Slonetsky) (April 26, 1803 - January 3, 1808)
- Eugene (Bolkhovitinov) (January 24, 1808 - July 19, 1813)
- Onesiphorus (Borovik) (February 22, 1814 - November 28, 1827)
- Moses (Bogdanov-Antipov-Platonov) (28 November 1827 - 29 November 1828)
- Stephen (Romanovsky) (November 24, 1828 - March 1, 1841)
- Innocent (Borisov) (1 March - 31 December 1841)
- Irinarkh (Popov) (January 12, 1842 - November 12, 1844)
- Eulampius (Pyatnitskii) (November 22, 1844 - June 15, 1852)
- Theognost (Lebedev) (13 July 1852 - 31 July 1856)
- Christopher (Emmaussky) (31 July 1856 - 17 June 1866)
- Paul (Dobrohotov) (August 21, 1866 - July 7, 1869)
- Palladius (Rayev-Pisarev) (July 15, 1869 - June 13, 1873)
- Theodosius (Shapovalenko) (13 June 1873 - 22 August 1883)
- Israel (Nikulitsky) (October 25, 1883 - April 23, 1894)
- Anthony (Florensov) (April 30, 1894 - June 12, 1895)
- Alexis (Sobolev) (June 12, 1895 - April 21, 1906)
- Nikon (Rozhdestvensky) (25 April 1906 - 29 May 1912)
- Anthony (Bystrov) (1911) in / y, en. Velsky
- Alexander (Trapitsyn) (May 16, 1912 – 1924)
- Alexander (Nadezhin) (March 1921 - November 1922), declined to renovationism
- Nicholas (Karaulov) (1923) administrator, bishop of Velsk
- Sylvester (Bratanovsky) (1923-1928)
- Ambrose (Smirnov) (28 November 1928 – 1931)
- Benedict (Carpenters) (1931 - 16 June 1933) in / y, en. Kronstadt
- Benedict (Carpenters) (June 16 - October 18, 1933)
- Stephen (Znamirovsky) (18 October 1933 - October 1936)
- Juvenal (Mashkovsky) (1936-1937)
- John (Sokolov) (October 1936 – 1937) in / y, en. Volokolamsk (1936), then the Archangel (1937)
- Alexis (Sergeyev) (5–16 August 1937)
- George (Anisimov) (13 September 1937 - September 1940)
  - 1940-1944 - vacant
- Gregory (Chukov) (1944) administrator, Archbishop of Pskov and Porkhov
- Justin (Maltsev) (January 8, 1945 - August 15, 1949)
- Gabriel (Ogorodnikov) (15 August 1949 - 15 July 1959)
- Mstislav (Volonsevich) (July 15, 1959 - May 25, 1965)
- Sergius (Larin) (25 May - 15 June 1965) in the / u, Arch. Yaroslavsky
- Melchizedek (Lebedev) (June 17, 1965 - October 7, 1967)
- Methodius (Menzak) (October 7, 1967 - February 2, 1972)
- Paul (Golyshev) (2 February - 11 October 1972)
- Michael (Chub) (October 11, 1972 - September 3, 1974)
- Damascene (Bodry) (September 3, 1974 - October 4, 1979)
- Theodosius (Dykun) (October 4 - December 27, 1979)
- Michael (Mudyugin) (27 December 1979 - 23 February 1993)
- Maximilian (Lazarenko) (April 10, 1993 - 30 May 2014)
- Ignatius (Deputatov) (30 May 2014 — 25 August 2020)
- Sabbas (Mikheyev) (since 25 August 2020)
