= Luchnikovo =

Luchnikovo Лучниково
- Village
- Location within Vologda Oblast Location within Russia
- Coordinates: 59°20′N 39°50′E
- Country: Russia
- Region: Vologda Oblast
- District: Vologodsky District
- Time zone: UTC+3:00

Luchnikovo (Russian: Лучниково) is a rural locality (a village) in Semyonkovskoye Rural Settlement, Vologodsky District, Vologda Oblast, Russia. The population was 26 as of 2002.

== Geography ==
Luchnikovo is located 17 km north of Vologda (the district's administrative centre) by road. Obukhovo is the nearest rural locality.
