= International Institute of the Athonite Legacy in Ukraine =

Ukrainian non-profit organization

The International Institute of the Athonite Legacy in Ukraine (IIALU) (Ukrainian: Міжнародний інститут афонської спадщини в Україні) is a Ukrainian non-profit organization for the study of the Christian Eastern Orthodox Athonite movement, centered in the monastic community of Mount Athos in Greece.

Founded in 2010, the IIALU membership includes academics, researchers and public figures of all nationalities who are interested in the study of Athos, its history and spiritual heritage.

== History ==
The group was started in 2010 by Serhii Shumylo, an ecclesiastical history researcher. In 2013, the group became an institute based in Kyiv with the blessing of the elders of Athos.

== IIALU structure ==
- Honorary Chairman: A.-E. Tachiaos (Thessaloniki, Greece), PhD, Corresponding Member of the Academy of Athens, Professor of Aristotle University of Thessaloniki
- Director and founder: Sergey Viktorovich Shumilo, researcher and author of articles and books on Mount Athos, editor-in-chief the Athonite Heritage journal.

IIALU comes under the aegis of the Academic Council of Ukrainian and Oversees Academics specialising in the history and heritage of Mount Athos. It has representatives in Greece, France, Italy, Russia, Poland and Bulgaria; it works closely with a number of Athonite monasteries, and in their libraries and archives.

== Activities ==
IIALU researches documents in Ukrainian and Athonite archives to do with historical, spiritual and cultural ties between Ukraine and Athos. Its members attend international conferences and take part in awareness-raising projects.

IIALU Events organised with the support of the Institute of International Conferences the following events:

- Athos and the Slavic World (Kyiv, 2015);
- Little Athos. Monasteries and Monasticism in Transcarpathia: Tradition and Modernity (Mukachevo, 2015);
- International Orthodox Film Festival about the traditions of Mount Athos (Kyiv, 2015);
- Rus’ and Mount Athos: a Millennium of Spiritual and Cultural Ties (Chernigov, 2014);
- Reading the History and Culture of Kievan Rus'’ (Chernigov, 2013);
- Hesychasm in the History and Culture of the Orthodox East (Chernigov, 2012);
- The Effects of Christianisation on Kievan Rus', 1150 (Chernigov 2010);
- Round tables in Athens and Ukraine; seminars, lectures and presentations.

In 2013, to mark the millennium of Russian Athos, the Russian Athonite information and educational portal, was created with the sponsorship of IIALU.

At the initiative of IIALU, the Ukrainian Rada (P)arliament) drafted a resolution officially to celebrate the spiritual and cultural ties between Kievan Rus' and the Monastic Republic in 2016 (No. 4543 from 08.27.2014).

From 2014, IIALU has been running a Transcarpathian branch, headed by Y. Danylets, for the study of spiritual and historical ties between Transcarpathia and Athos.

Sergey Shumilo was the first to unearth the abandoned Athonite Monidrion Chorny Vir, founded by Zaporozhian Cossacks in 1747. His findings have been published as a monograph. Shumilo has also published the little-known letters of St Paisy Velichkovsky to the last Ottoman of the Zaporozhian Host, Petro Kalnyshevsky. The work concludes with detailed biographies of the Athonite Elder John Vyshensky, Metropolitan Isaiah Kopynsky and others.

== IIALU publications ==
IILU publishes the journal Athonska Spadschyna (The Athonite Heritage)

This is an anthology of articles on the history, and spiritual and cultural heritage of the Holy Mountain in Slavic and Kievan Rus'. The preface in the journal's first number is by Charles, Prince of Wales, Patron of the Friends of Mount Athos (UK and USA).

Members of the journal's editorial board:

- Metropolitan Kallistos (Ware) of Diokleia (Oxford, UK);
- Professor A.-E. Tachiaos, PhD, corresponding member of the Athens Academy, (Thessaloniki, Greece);
- Academician P.P. Talochko, PhD, director of the NASU Institute of Archaeology, (Kyiv, Ukraine);
- Dr Graham Speake, senior fellow at the Oxford Centre for Byzantine Studies, Chairman of the Friends of Mount Athos (Oxford, UK);
- Dr Nicholas Fennell, visiting research fellow of the University of Winchester, Representative of the Friends of Mount Athos, (Winchester, UK);
- Sergey Viktorovich Shumilo, director of the International Institute of the Athonite Legacy in Ukraine (Kyiv, Ukraine).

Other publications:

- S.V. Shumilo, Spiritual Zaporozhia on Mount Athos. The little-known Cossack Chorny Vir Monidrion on the Holy Mountain, Kyiv, 2015. ISBN 978-966-2371-34-5.
- S.V. Shumilo, St Paisy Velichkovsky and the Zaporozhian Host. The Little-known Letters of St Paisy Velichkovsky to the Ottoman of the Zaporozhian Host, Petro Kalnyshevsky, Kyiv & Serpukhov, 2015. ISBN 978-5-9905423-3-4.
- The journal, Athonskoe nasledie (The Athonite Heritage), the International Institute of the Athonite Legacy in Ukraine. Issues 1-2., Kyiv., 2015. (Certificate of state registration of the print media: Series KV No. 21259-11059-F of 20 March 2015).

== Sources and literature ==
1. Conference Report: Rus’ and Mount Athos: A Millennium of Spiritual and Cultural Ties. https://networks.h-net.org/node/3076/discussions/56199/conference-report-%E2%80%9Crus%E2%80%99-and-mount-athos-millennium-spiritual-and
2. La Rus’ et l’Athos: un millénaire de liens spirituels et culturels http://eurorbem.paris-sorbonne.fr/spip.php?article116&lang=fr
3. Le congrès international « LaRus’etl’Athos: unmillénairedeliensspirituelsetculturels » s’esttenu à Tchernihiv http://www.orient-mediterranee.com/IMG/pdf/AthosInfoFR.pdf
4. ATHOS: PRINCIPAL FINDINGS AND DISCOVERIES OF 2015 http://www.pravlife.org/content/afon-glavnye-nahodki-i-otkrytiya-2015-goda
5. An Unknown Cossack Monidrion, Founded by the Zaporozhian Cossacks in 1747 and discovered in Greece
6. The Role of the Holy Mountain in the History of Ukrainian Culture and Spirituality https://day.kyiv.ua/article/poshta-dnya/posylaty-rusyniv-skhylnykh-do-blahochestya-na-afon
7. THE LOST WORLDOF THE HOLY MOUNTAIN http://pravlife.org/content/zateryannyy-mir-svyatoy-gory-afon
8. An abandoned monastery was found on Athos, that used to be settled by the Ukrainian Cossacks, who accepted the nunhood (photo) http://fakty.ua/206846-na-afone-otyskali-zabroshennyj-skit-v-kotorom-selilis-ukrainskie-kazaki-prinyavshie-monashestvo-foto
9. The Lost Monastery of the Zaporozhian Cossacks http://kp.ua/life/505901-zateriannaia-obytel-zaporozhskykh-kazakov
10. MOUNT ATHOS AS A TREND, OR WHAT THE ELDERS SAY http://pravlife.org/content/moda-na-afon
11. St Paisy Velichkovsky foresaw the canonisation of Petro Kalnyshevsky 240 years ago. http://religions.unian.ua/orthodoxy/1200253-shanuvannya-petra-kalnishevskogo-yak-svyatogo-sche-240-rokiv-tomu-peredbachiv-starets-prp-pajisiy-velichkovskiy.html
12. The Discovery of New Relics in the abandoned Cossack Athonite Monidrion http://www.religion.in.ua/news/ukrainian_news/30176-u-zakinutomu-ukrayinskomu-kozackomu-skitu-na-afoni-znajshli-novi-relikviyi.html
13. The Question of the Foundation of the Ancient Russian Monastery on Mount Athos at the time of St. Prince Vladimir of Kiev http://afonit.info/biblioteka/istoriya-russkogo-monastyrya/knyaz-vladimir-kievskiy-i-afon
14. The Lay Elders in the Spiritual Traditions of the Ukrainian Kobzar Minstrels http://www.religion.in.ua/main/history/23860-miryanske-starchestvo-v-duxovnij-tradiciyi-ukrayinskogo-kobzarstva.html
15. The Unknown Letters of St. Paisius Velichkovsky to the Ottoman of the Zaporozhian Host, Petro Kalnyshevsky presented for the first time at a conference in Chernigov http://www.religion.in.ua/news/ukrainian_news/27605-na-konferencii-v-chernigove-vpervye-predstavili-neizvestnye-pisma-sv-paisiya-velichkovskogo-k-atamanu-vojska-zaporozhskogo-petru-kalnyshevskomu.html
