= Vincent Berg =

Soviet bishop (born 1952)

- Виктор Владимирович Чекалин
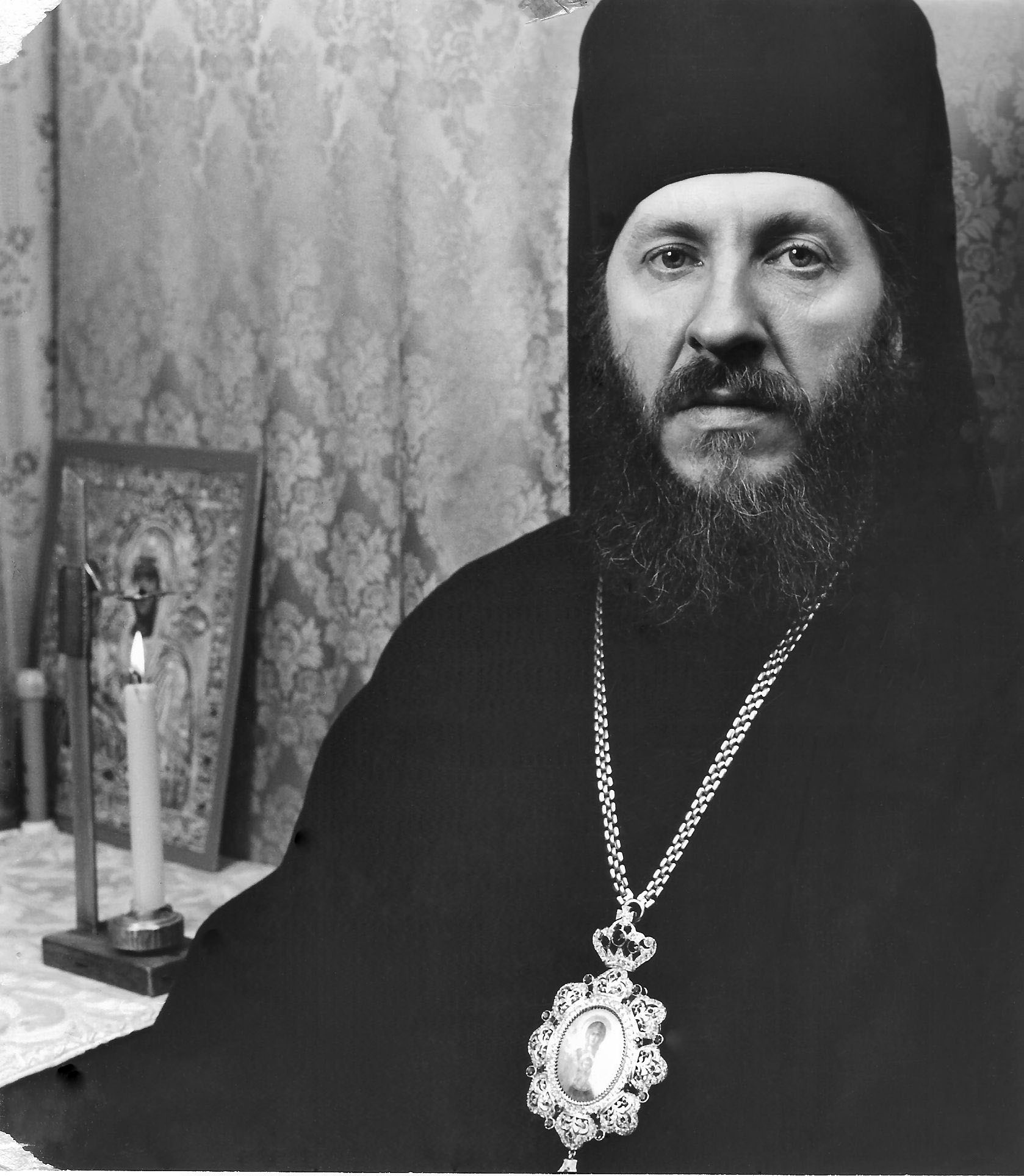
- Bishop Vikenty Chekalin of Yasnaya Polyana in 1991
- Born: Viktor Vladimirovich Chekalin; February 19, 1952 (age 74); Tula
- Known for: mainly for the fact that in 1990, together with Bishop John (Bodnarchuk), he was involved in reestablishing the hierarchy of the revived UAOC.

Vincent Victor Berg (born Viktor Vladimirovich Chekalin, Russian: Виктор Владимирович Чекалин, also known as bishop Vikenty Chekalin, Russian: Викентий Чекалин; February 19, 1952, Tula) is a Soviet religious figure, known mainly for the fact that in 1990, together with Bishop John (Bodnarchuk), he was involved in reestablishing the hierarchy of the revived UAOC. Also in 1990, he established the Russian Orthodox Catholic Church.

His activities caused and continue to cause a sharply hostile reaction from the Moscow Patriarchate and the Russian authorities. In his interview in December 2022, Berg warns that he has been and continues to be subjected to targeted discredit and slander using falsifications and disinformation.

Since 1992, he has been living in Australia, having retired from public religious activities.

== Early life ==
Chekalin was born on February 19, 1952, in Tula. According to the Izvestia, "Viktor Chekalin, along with his mother, was abandoned early by his father, a prominent party and economic regional worker. The son was the main support in the family". In 1969, he graduated from high school.

In a 2022 interview, Vincent Berg claimed that before completing high school, a high-ranking KGB officer offered him two options to become a political intelligence officer: studying at the Moscow Institute of International Relations to obtain a diplomatic cover or undergoing specialized medical training to work as a psychiatrist in international organizations like the World Health Organization. He chose the latter, citing his family's governmental positions and his academic and athletic achievements as factors in his selection.

In 1974 he graduated from the Tula Polytechnic Institute (now Tula State University). In 1978, according to his 1989 autobiography, he received a degree in sociology, worked in "state institutions", since 1980 he was a member of the Soviet Sociological Association, which united sociologists, as well as instructors in the ideological work of the CPSU and Komsomol. According to his 1982 autobiography however, after graduating from the institute, he received a diploma not as a sociologist, but as an engineer, and before switching to church service he worked as a "leading engineer of the Head Specialized Design and Technology Bureau of automated control systems". According to his 2022 interview, "After completion of special and medical training, I was working as an instructor in the same special school until my departure to the Russian Orthodox Church in 1981." According to the same interview, "as a result of my professional study of the human psyche and a search for personal meaning of life, I found God and turned towards religion. My supervisors discovered this and decided that I became professionally compromised. I was unable to continue working as required. After a certain struggle, they allowed me to start serving in the Church as I wanted. They hoped to use me as a clergyman for their purposes."

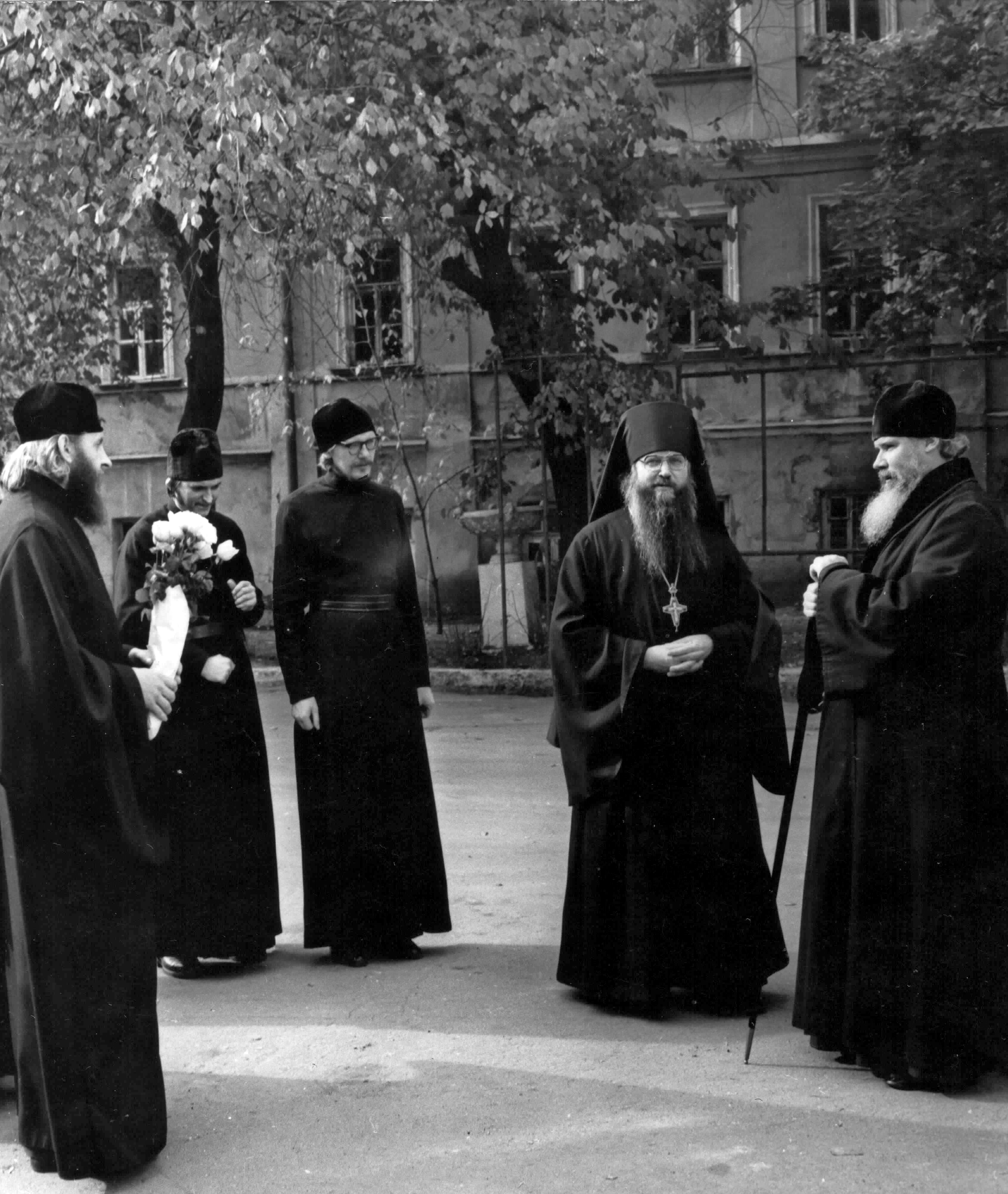
Greeting the future Patriarch of Moscow Alexey II (Ridiger). Chekalin (on the left) – with flowers

== Ministry for the Russian Orthodox Church ==
In February 1981, he left the civil job and started serving in the Church as the reader and singer of the left choir of the Church of the Savior in Tula, then storekeeper, manager and clerk of the Tula diocesan administration. In April 1982, bishop German (Timofeyev) of Tula and Belyov ordained him a deacon, and Chekalin became a cleric of the Diocese of Tula. He was appointed a cleric of the Assumption Church of the town of Aleksin, but here, referring to a sore throat, he constantly missed services without blessing and valid reasons. On December 20, 1982, Chekalin wrote a petition to the ruling bishop to release him from service at the church in the town of Aleksin, after which, by decree No. 36 of February 17, 1983, Bishop German (Timofeyev) of Tula released him from the aforementioned position and appointed him a watchman of the Tula diocesan administration. Already on May 2, 1983, Chekalin wrote that he had fully recovered and asked to be sent back to serve as a deacon in one of the churches of the Diocese of Tula. On the basis of this petition, by Decree No. 150 of June 15, 1983, he was appointed full-time deacon of the Theotokos-Nativity Church of the town of Belyov. However, soon after that, on June 17, 1983, Bishop German (Timofeyev) of Tula issued a document to Viktor Chekalin with the following content: "In view of your disagreement to accept the appointment to serve as a deacon in the Nativity of Theotokos Church of the town of Belyov, since you have returned my decree to me, I do not mind if you find yourself a feasible job at your discretion and your capabilities". On August 29, 1983, by decree of Bishop German No. 254 Chekalin was "dismissed for staff according to the petition".

On August 31 of the same year, Bishop German (Timofeyev) received a letter from the Patriarch Pimen of Moscow and All Russia, according to which he had to give Chekalin a letter of leave and hand over his personal file "to place him in the Diocese of Moscow." At the same time, with the blessing of Patriarch Pimen, Chekalin was enrolled to the Danilov Monastery in Moscow. This monastery was transferred to the ROC that year by the Government of the Soviet Union "to create in it and on the adjacent site the Administrative Center of the Moscow Patriarchate" and the residence of the Moscow Patriarchs. According to Chekalin's own testimony, being a celibate deacon, he carried the obedience of a cellarer in the monastery being restored, "was responsible for supplying the brethren", as well as "for ensuring the construction of the monastery with everything necessary." However, researcher Serhii Shumylo calls these testimonies exaggerated, referring to the absence in the Chekalin's personal file the data on such significant obediences.

However, the well-known associations of Serhii Shumylo with the Moscow Patriarchate (ROC MP) and the Ukrainian Orthodox Church of the Moscow Patriarchate (UOC MP), and the very evidence of access to Chekalin's personal file in the Moscow Patriarchate allow us to doubt the independence and impartiality of Serhii Shumylo as a researcher of this topic and the complete reliability of his relevant statements, including those in this publication. They require an independent verification and confirmation. This is what he further states.

In the Danilov Monastery, Chekalin was denied monastic tonsure, and he did not stay long in it. In a letter to the namestnik of the monastery, Archimandrite Eulogius (Smirnov), referring to a sore throat, he wrote that he could not serve in autumn, winter and spring, and could only serve in summer. Therefore, he is going to "submit a petition to Mount Athos: I believe that the grace of the Holy Mountain and its beneficial climate for me will bring me spiritual and physical healing"

In May 1984, he was expelled from the monastery and sent back to the Diocese of Tula. As Eulogius (Smirnov) later recalled when he was Archbishop of Vladimir and Suzdal, "apparently, he was still looking not for monasticism, but for a good position and the opportunity to live in a monastery on a grand scale. Later I was told that the deacon, after returning to Tula, for a long time posed as a "Danilovets", pursuing personal goals".

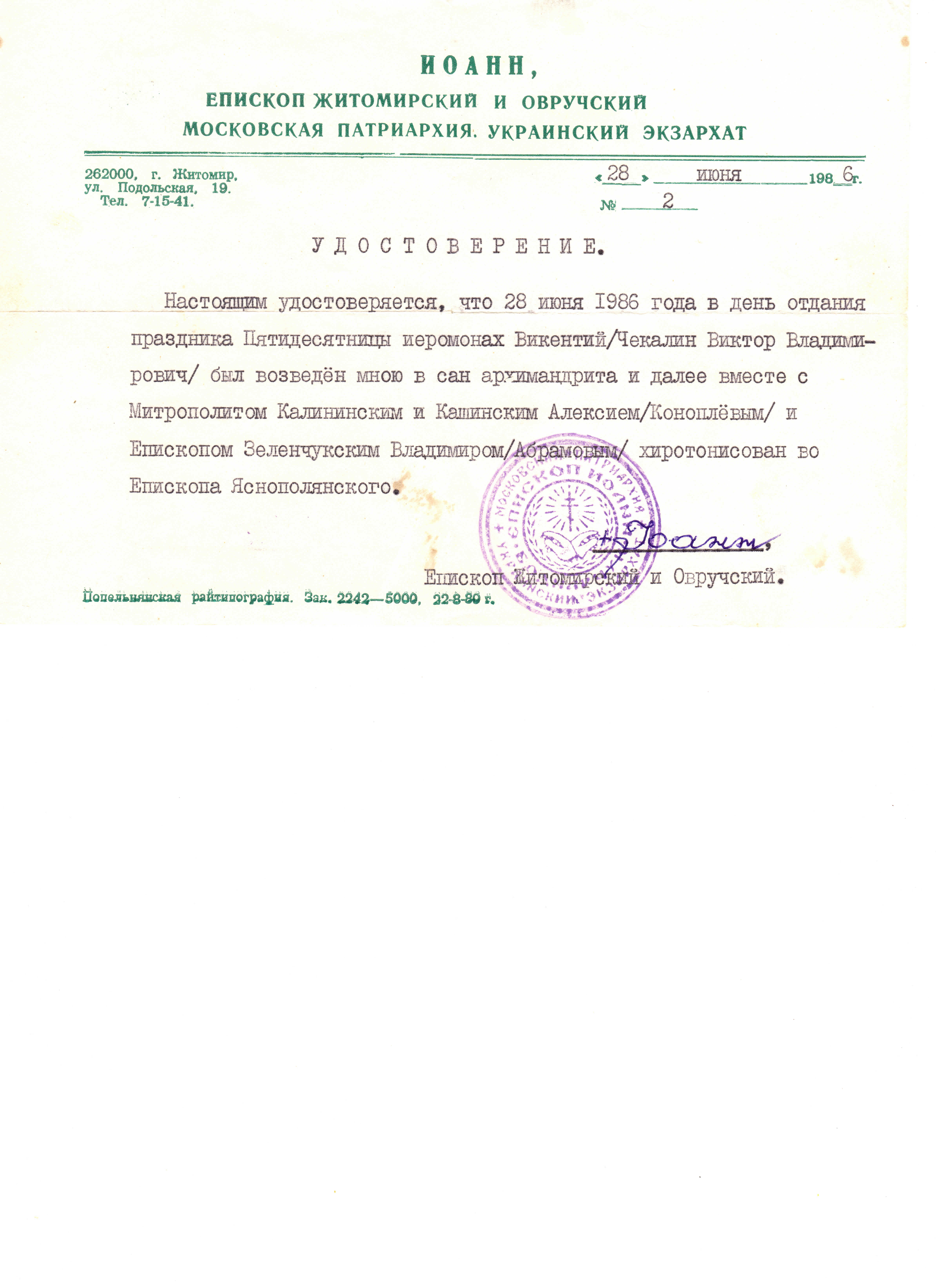
Certificate of Chekalin's Episcopal Consecration issued by John (Bodnarchuk) in replacement of the original one ceased by the KGB

On 28 June 1986 Vikenti (Chekalin) was consecrated as a bishop of one of the Russian Catacomb churches. In his consecration participated at least two bishops of the Russian Orthodox Church (Metropolitan of Kalinin and Kashyn, Alexiy (Konoplev) and Bishop of Zhitomir and Ovruch, Ioann (Bodnarchuk)) and Bishop of the Zelenchuk Catacomb Church Vladimir (Abramov). In August 1986 Vikenti (Chekalin) was arrested by the KGB agents and he claimed that they took away his original bishophood certificate signed by all three bishops.

== Criminal case, marriage and defrocking ==
In March 1986, Chekalin started working as a teacher of labor and mathematics at an eight-year school in the village of Yagodnoye, Kaluga Oblast. However, here, according to the parents of schoolchildren, in September 1986 he was arrested on charges of molesting minors. While awaiting sentencing, he spent six months in a Kaluga prison. During the investigation, he was subjected to psychiatric examination, after which, on February 26, 1987, by the verdict of the People's Court of Ulyanovsky District, Kaluga Oblast, he was found guilty and sentenced under article 120 of the Criminal Code of the RSFSR ("depraved acts against minors") to 3.5 years of forced correctional labor in the Kaluga Region. During the arrest, a search was carried out in his apartment, during which "tape cassettes, notebooks, books, etc." were seized. However, the question arises as to how the seizure of such items corresponds to the nature of the charges brought against him. As Chekalin later claimed, "for the sake of saving my life ... I yielded to the pressure on me and later, at the investigation and at a closed court hearing in February 1987, I admitted my falsified guilt in the corruption of minors. I was sentenced to three years of forced labor at the construction sites of the national economy. During my time in the special commissariat, I did not consider it possible to appeal the verdict." Chekalin explained his recognition of the charges by saying that the investigation "suggested that I either admit the charge proposed to me and be sentenced on probation, or be convicted of financial violations at Danilov Monastery, whose cellarer I was in 1983–1984, and receive 7 years in a penal colony".

He served his sentence in the special commissariat of the Oktyabrsky Department of Internal Affairs of the city of Kaluga from August 1986 to December 1987, worked not in the city construction sites, as Serhii Shumylo claims, but as a leading engineer of a computer center. At the same time, according to Chekalin, on May 16, 1987, "while on forced labor," he "formally registered a marriage with Levina Lyubov Ivanovna, dying of liver cancer, at her request, in order to adopt her son. There was no other way for adoption then, since I was accused of corrupting children." A month later, on June 11, 1987, Levina died. In December 1987, he was released early for good behavior, since the article under which he was convicted fell under amnesty. He returned to Tula. The fact of his early release gave rise to rumors that he was recruited by the KGB in prison. A certificate kept in the archives of Holy Trinity Theological Seminary in Jordanville, New York, states that after his early release, Chekalin got a job at the publishing house of the Seventh-day Adventist' Seminary, located in the urban-type settlement of Zaoksky, Tula Oblast.

On May 15, 1988, by a resolution of Patriarch Pimen, he was deprived of the diaconate on the basis of the 26th Apostolic canon (marriage after the priesthood ordination), about which Chancellor of the Moscow Patriarchy Metropolitan Vladimir (Sabodan) of Rostov and Novocherkassk, notified Archbishop Maxim (Krokha) of Tula and Belyov by letter dated May 26, 1988. As Serhii Shumylo noted: "both the criminal punishment of Chekalin and the deprivation of his deaconry did not have the character of repression for any 'oppositional beliefs' or 'dissent', which were not observed for him. They were purely moral and criminal in nature, and there was no talk about his alleged 'secret bishopric' or involvement in the 'Catacomb Church' at that time".

== Falsification of tonsure, priestly and episcopal ordination ==
As Serhii Shumylo notes, "there is every reason to believe that the former deacon Viktor Chekalin never had not only a presbyterian dignity, but even monasticism, and the name he used 'Vikenty' can rather be considered a kind of creative or agent pseudonym". Chekalin himself later claimed that in May–June 1982, in the Trinity-Sergius Lavra, he was "tonsured a monk with the name Vikenty and ordained a hieromonk by Archbishop Sergius (Golubtsov), who lived in retirement in the Lavra." At the same time, according to him, he did not remember the exact date. In fact, there has never been a personal file of a monk named Vikenty (Chekalin) in the archives of the Trinity-Sergius Lavra, there are no mentions of him in the documents of the Lavra, as well as in the correspondence of the Lavra with Patriarch Pimen and with the office of the Moscow Patriarchate (since the Lavra is a patriarchal stauropegion, the consent of the Patriarch was required for any ordination of its inhabitants). Moreover, Archbishop Sergius (Golubtsov) died on June 16, 1982, and therefore could not refute Chekalin's statements.

Apparently after that, he came into contact with the "sekachevites" (a "branch" of Catacomb Church with lack of apostolic succession), posing as a hieromonk. In the archive of the Holy Trinity Theological Seminary in Jordanville, a certificate compiled by representatives of the sekachevites has been preserved, in which it is reported that Chekalin "after two months of traveling with elderly [sekachevites] hierarchs, without having received any community or parish and not wanting to work independently, preaching the Gospel, and, in view of the danger of illegal life and ministry, he retired from the labors of the priesthood." The same certificate stated that Chekalin, "offended by the irreversibility of what happened, wrote a letter to the local department of the KGB of the city of Zelenchuk with a description of the place of residence and the works of Metr. Gennadius (Sekach), Metr. Theodosius and Metr. Gregory, who then lived without a residence permit with an old schema-nun in the house." Representatives of the sekachevites claimed that the letter of Vikenty Chekalin was handed over by employees of the local KGB branch "to a local newspaper, which published a large article in its issue with all sorts of details of their lives," after which they were forced to leave Zelenchuk hastily at night. Chekalin himself strongly denies writing any letter to the KGB or contacting them. Moreover, sending such a letter to the newspaper would not be at all in the interests of the KGB. Therefore, this story looks like a crude slander. The certificate denies that Vikenty Chekalin belongs to the hierarchy of the "Sekach current". In another reference kept in the archives of Holy Trinity Seminary in Jordanville, it is stated that "Chekalin were anathematized by 8 bishops of the Catacomb Church for the unseemly actions" and "his ministry in the rank of hieromonk was banned".

After that Chekalin become a "bishop". He chose title "of Yasnaya Polyana", which was residence of well known Russian writer Leo Tolstoy, who was excommunicated from the Church in 1901. At different times, he called different names, dates and versions of his ordination, which did not coincide with each other. Thus, in a petition to the ROCOR Synod in 1989, he claimed that two bishops took part in his ordination: "In 1986, Metropolitan Alexius (Konoplyov) of Kalinin and Kashin and Bishop Vladimir of the Catacomb Church were consecrated bishop. The ordination was carried out secretly… He received all ordinations from the hierarchs of the Moscow Patriarchate. I have a certificate of deaconal ordination, but I can't confirm the priestly and episcopal ordination with anything, except for the oath before the cross and the Gospel." At a meeting of the ROCOR Synod in New York in January 1990, Chekalin confirmed his testimony, as there is an entry in the minutes of the Synod No. 685: "In June, Viktor N. Chekalin does not remember the date and day, 1986, in Tver, in the apartment of Metropolitan Alexius (Konoplyov), at night, secretly, without outside witnesses, allegedly Hieromonk Vikenty was elevated to the rank of archimandrite and at the same time ordained bishop by Bishop Vladimir (Abramov) of the Catacomb Church and Metropolitan Alexius (Konoplyov) of the Moscow Patriarchate." Chekalin did not mention the third bishop at that time. Serhii Shumylo prefers to ignore the simple possibility that Chekalin at that time might not have the consent of the third bishop to disclose his name.

Both of these hierarchs, who allegedly ordained him in 1986, were already dead at that time. Metropolitan Alexius (Konoplev) died on October 7, 1988. As Serhii Shumylo noted, Metropolitan Alexius has never been distinguished by "any oppositional sentiments either towards the leaders of the Moscow Patriarchate or the Soviet government." The long-time subdeacon and secretary of Metropolitan Alexius, and later Bishop Victor (Oleynik) of Tver and Kashin, in his 1990 report refuted Chekalin's claims about his ordination by Metropolitan Alexius: "As a close person who always accompanied Metropolitan Alexius on trips, I consider it my duty to testify that vladyka Metropolitan, being a faithful son of the Russian Orthodox Church and strictly observing its canons, without the determination of His Holiness the Patriarch and the Holy Synod did not perform episcopal consecration. The lies put forward, discrediting Metropolitan Alexius, outrages and offends me". The sekachevite hierarch Vladimir (Abramov), died on January 15, 1987. Representatives of the sekachevites denied Vladimir (Abramov)'s involvement in the ordination of Chekalin and never recognized the latter as the hierarch of their group. According to their testimonies, Vladimir (Abramov) had never met Metropolitan Alexius (Konoplyov) and other hierarchs of the Russian Orthodox Church. Chekalin never had a single catacomb community under his care and, apparently, did not serve not only as a "catacomb bishop", but also as a "catacomb priest".

== Attempt to switch to ROCOR ==
As follows from his appeal to the First Hierarch of ROCOR Metropolitan Vitaly (Ustinov) and the Synod of Bishops of ROCOR dated July 17, 1989, in January 1989 he broke with the Moscow Patriarchate: "In 1989, in January, in an open letter addressed to Patriarch Pimen, [I] announced withdrawal from the Moscow Patriarchate from-for the lack of a communitarian structure, the prosperity of corruption, bribery, flattery, sycophancy, the absence of the living Word of God in churches, doubts about the canonicity of the ROC". As follows from Chekalin's interview with the emigrant newspaper "New Russian Word", given in February 1990, the chairman of the Council for Religious Affairs at the Council of Ministers of the Soviet Union, Konstantin Kharchev, offered him the "official registration" of the structures of the Catacomb Church in the Soviet Union. According to Chekalin, in a conversation before the trip, he "listened to his opinion that the split in the Russian Orthodox Church needs to be overcome. Kharchev believes that the Church should have a healing influence on the entire Soviet society". This conversation was to take place no later than June 1989, when Kharchev was dismissed from this position.

On July 17, 1989, Chekalin wrote an appeal to the ROCOR, where he tells about himself and suggests opening ROCOR parishes on the territory of the Soviet Union: "At present I see the revival of Orthodoxy in Russia in the creation of legal parishes of the Russian Church Abroad, the ministry of which would be carried out openly, regardless of the reaction and possible opposition of the authorities. The Church should use every opportunity to preach the gospel ... all this is not available in the Moscow Patriarchate. The catacomb church, due to being underground, cannot effectively carry out the preaching of the Word of God. It is necessary to return true Orthodoxy to Russia from abroad." Chekalin signed the "appeal" not as "bishop" or "hieromonk" or "deacon", but as "Monk Vikenty", possibly, out of humility. At the same time, in the letter he opposes himself not only to the Moscow Patriarchate, but also to the Catacomb Church, which confirms the fact that he was not accepted by the catacombs (how?). According to the same interview with Chekalin "New Russian Word", before his trip to the United States, he was again at a reception with Kharchev. Apparently, Chekalin's trip to the United States to attend a meeting of the Synod of Bishops of the ROCOR was carried out with the direct patronage of Kharchev. In December 1989 – January 1990, Chekalin managed to leave the Soviet Union for the United States, where he attended a meeting of the Synod of Bishops of the ROCOR in New York City, where he addressed its members and answered their questions.

Bishop Lazar (Zhurbenko), secretly ordained to the ROCOR for the care of the catacomb parishes of the ROCOR in the Soviet Union back in 1982, who was present at the Synod meeting in New York City at that time, conducted an individual inquiry of Chekalin. He asked him a number of leading questions, to which he could not reliably answer and began to get confused, thanks to which his imposture was revealed. At the same time, a suspicion was expressed at the ROCOR Synod that Chekalin was a KGB agent sent to the Synod under the guise of a "catacomb bishop" to infiltrate the ROCOR and lead the creation of its legal church structures in the Soviet Union under the control of Soviet state security agencies. The fact of Chekalin's early release from prison also aroused suspicion. As a result, on January 31, 1990, the Synod Decided: "1. Based on the available data provided by the petitioner Viktor Nikolaevich Chekalin, who calls himself Vikenty, the Synod of Bishops does not consider it possible to recognize the rank of bishop or presbyter for the petitioner. 2. In connection with the above, leave Viktor Nikolaevich Chekalin's petition without consequences." Having refused recognition, he was offered to live on probation at the Holy Trinity Monastery in Jordanville as an ordinary novice under the supervision of the authorities of the monastery, after which, in case of a positive passage of the probation period, the question of his acceptance as a simple monk or ordination as a priest in the future could be considered. Chekalin refused. He tried to steal antimins, the bishop's panagia and liturgical vessels from the altar of the Synodal cathedral in New York City, after which he was expelled with a scandal. Chekalin categorically denies this and calls it deliberate slander. Also, it raises the question of why he needed to do this at the risk of his own discredit, if he had antimensions, bishop's panagia and liturgical vessels in Russia.

Before leaving the USA back to the Soviet Union, Chekalin gave an interview to the emigrant newspaper "New Russian Word" in February 1990 in New York, in which he expressed his disappointment in the Russian Orthodox Church, subjecting it to harsh criticism. A little later, in a letter to Australia addressed to an employee of the Russian emigrant newspaper "Unification" Evgenia Shirinskaya dated July 22, 1990, Chekalin, confirming that he was not recognized in the ROCOR as a canonical bishop, wrote with indignation: "The Church Abroad claims supremacy and the right to decide and judge who did what, who is canonical and who is not, etc. Under the pretext of fighting for the purity of Orthodoxy, spiritual blindness and dislike of one's neighbor are actually manifested. For example, the Synod considers Bishop Vladimir (Abramov) uncanonical, since he did not have a certificate of episcopal consecration and was ordained by people whose succession from the apostles is doubted ... Judge for yourself, can I forgive the Church Abroad declaring Bishop Vladimir an impostor?.. My sharpness here is intentional, because the offense for my brothers is great and my disappointment is great. I myself had to be in prison, subjected to torture, psychiatric examination — but this is only a small fraction of what my catacomb brethren had to go through. Now Metropolitan Vitaly and others like him are trying to judge us, evaluate our "correctness" and claim spiritual supremacy ... Metropolitan Vitaly and others like him have been hard at work compromising me. All sorts of rumors and slander are actively spreading about me at home and abroad. For example, that I stole antimins from Metropolitan Vitaly". In his 2022 interview, he accused Bishop Lazar (Zhurbenko) of being sent by KGB specifically to discredit him, and also stated that he "found the nationalistic atmosphere dominating there, as spiritually unacceptable"

== Participation in the first ordinations of the UAOC ==
Having escaped with a scandal in early February 1990 from the Synod of Bishops of the ROCOR (ROCOR bought him a return air ticket and took him to the airport by car – are these signs of scandal and flight?), Chekalin returns to the Soviet Union, but immediately after returning he does not go home to Tula, but finds himself in Lviv, Ukraine, where he introduces himself as the ROCOR bishop, which he strongly denies, and meets the former bishop John (Bodnarchuk) of Zhytomyr and Ovruch, whom he had already known several years before, who transferred in October 1989 from the Russian Orthodox Church to the reviving Ukrainian Autocephalous Orthodox Church, which by the beginning of 1990 numbered about 200 parishes and communities, mainly in Western Ukraine. For a rapidly growing church organization, the issue of ordaining new bishops was acute, but there was not enough second bishop for such ordinations, and the hierarchs of the UAOC in diaspora could not come to the Soviet Union from abroad at that time. In such circumstances, it was decided to perform the ordination together with Viktor Chekalin, who returned from the US, yet, not offered his services, as Serhii Shumylo claims, but responded to Bodnarchuk's request. Later, Bodnarchuk testified to the members of the Holy Synod of the Russian Orthodox Church that he first met Chekalin in late February – early March 1990 in Lviv, believing that he was the legitimate bishop of the ROCOR. At the same time, he reported that Chekalin as the "bishop of the ROCOR" was introduced to him by one of the familiar workers of the regional committee of the Communist Party. In addition, John (Bodnarchuk) negotiated with several bishops regarding the possibility of their participation in the episcopal ordination of his brother priest Ioann Bodnarchuk. Not knowing which of them would be able to come, he left an empty space in the proxy letter, where the third bishop was supposed to sign. However, no other hierarch agreed to participate in this ordination. Yet, this statement by Shumylo contradicts eyewitness accounts.

Then they decided to ordain Ioann Bodnarchuk together. The decision to appoint Ioann Bodnarchuk was made without a conciliar discussion and the election of a candidate, hastily, secretly and bypassing the Church Rada of the UAOC. Even the primate of the UAOC of the USA, Metropolitan Mstyslav (Skrypnyk), was not informed. On March 30, priest Ioann Bodnarchuk became a monk with the name Basil, and on March 31, 1990, in the village of Mikhaylevichi, Drohobych Raion, Lviv Oblast, where the latter was rector, he was consecrated as "Bishop of Ternopil and Buchach". Thus, the first episcopal consecration in the history of third generation of the UAOC was performed. At the same time, in the proxy letter of Basil (Bodnarchuk) dated March 31, 1990, Chekalin's name is written first. This fact indicates that it was Chekalin who led and performed the ordination, and Bodnarchuk only served him. Bodnarchuk, who was defrocked at that time in the Russian Orthodox Church, apparently wanted to be safe by offering to lead the ordination to the "bishop of ROCOR", the legality of whose ordination at that time was not in doubt. In the same way, on April 7, 1990, in the village of Pidhaichyky, Kolomyia Raion, Ivano-Frankivsk Oblast, priest Andrew (Abramchuk) hastily and secretly was ordained "Bishop of Ivano-Frankivsk and Kolomyia". John (Bodnarchuk), Vikenty Chekalin and Basil (Bodnarchuk), who had been ordained by them, took part in his ordination. Further ordinations of the hierarchy of the UAOC have already been performed without the participation of Chekalin.

At first, Vikenty Chekalin was taken in the UAOC as a bishop of ROCOR. The official organ of the Ukrainian Orthodox Church in Canada, "Visnyk", called him "the prelate of the bishops of the UAOC." John Bodnarchuk even offered Viktor Chekalin to head the Russian-speaking diocese of the UAOC in Odesa. At the First All-Ukrainian Council of the UAOC, held on June 5–6, 1990 with the permission of the republican authorities in the Central House of Cinema in Kyiv, John (Bodnarchuk) publicly disclosed for the first time the fact of participation in the first ordinations of the UAOC Vikenty Chekalin, whom he called "bishop of the Russian Church Abroad". At the same time, there was no question of any third bishop participating in these ordinations. Bodnarchuk was so confident in the canonical perfection of the "bishop of ROCOR" that at that time he did not question the validity of the ordinations performed jointly with him. At the June council, Mstyslav (Skrypnyk) was elected UAOC patriarch in absentia. John (Bodnarchuk) was elected locum tenens with the title of "His Beatitude Metropolitan of Lviv and Galicia".

== Exposure, further falsifications and activities in Russia ==
Shortly after the Council of the UAOC in June 1990, when information about Chekalin's participation in ordinations under the guise of a "bishop of ROCOR" became public, evidence began to come from ROCOR representatives that this man was an impostor. At the end of the summer of 1990, the Synod of Bishops of the ROCOR issued an official statement, which stated: "The Synod of Bishops of the ROCOR informs the clergy and laity of all Orthodox parishes that Vikenty Chekalin, posing as a bishop of the Catacomb Church recognized by the Russian Church Abroad, is not really such, and all the sacraments he performs cannot be recognized as blessed. The Synod of Bishops of the ROCOR warns against even greater canonical errors due to the fact that a person who does not have the grace of apostolic succession could participate in the commission of episcopal ordinations". The evidence of Chekalin's imposture caused serious embarrassment within the UAOC itself. Many priests of the Russian Orthodox Church, who were thinking about joining the UAOC, refrained from such a step. The defectors began to ask questions and question the canonicity of UAOC episcopate. Henceforth, it was impossible to expect the recognition from the Ecumenical Patriarchate of Constantinople and other Local Churches. The primate of the UAOC, Mstyslav (Skrypnyk), also began to demand a report and explanations.

In such a situation, John (Bodnarchuk), at press conferences in Kyiv, stated that it was he, together with Metropolitan Alexius (Konoplyov) of Kalinin and Kashin and the Sekachevite bishop Vladimir (Abramov), who "secretly ordained" Vikenty Chekalin to the "bishop of Tula and Yasnaya Polyana in 1986". This statement contradicted earlier testimonies of Chekalin himself to the Synod of Bishops of the ROCOR in July 1989 – January 1990, where he stated that he was "ordained bishop" by only two hierarchs — Alexius (Konoplyov) and Vladimir (Abramov). Moreover, if at the Synod of Bishops of ROCOR Chekalin stated that Metropolitan Alexius (Konoplyov) elevated him to the rank of "archimandrite" at home, now he began to claim that Bishop John (Bodnarchuk) of Zhytomyr did it. An "exact date" of June 28, 1986, appeared, although at the Synod of Bishops of the ROCOR he refused to name any date. At the same time, John (Bodnarchuk) issued retroactively a forged certificate of the consecration of Vikenty Chekalin to the "bishop", which he signed "June 28, 1986" on the official letterhead of the Diocese of Zhytomyr and Ovruch of the Ukrainian Exarchate of the Russian Orthodox Church, printed in the printing house on August 22, 1989, about which there is a typographical indication in small print in the lower left corner form.

Initially, in all the testimonies about the first ordination for the UAOC of Basil (Bodnarchuk) as "Bishop of Ternopil", John (Bodnarchuk), Archpriest Volodymyr Yarema and other UAOC officials stated that only two bishops took part in it: John (Bodnarchuk) and Vikenty Chekalin. Similarly, Chekalin testified until the summer of 1990 that he performed the first ordination of the UAOC in March 1990 together with John Bodnarchuk, without mentioning any third bishop. But after the scandal over Chekalin's imposture broke out in the summer of 1990, at press conferences in Kyiv, John (Bodnarchuk) said that in addition to himself and Chekalin, a certain "patriarchal bishop N" secretly participated in the ordination of Basil (Bodnarchuk) on March 31, 1990, who according to John (Bodnarchuk) wished to remain anonymous. It was stated that the participants and witnesses present at the ordination took "an oath not to disclose this secret until death". No longer taking on faith the contradictory statements of John (Bodnarchuk), the UAOC patriarch Mstyslav (Skrypnyk) in November 1990 actually dismissed John (Bodnarchuk). At the same time, for the first time, Archpriest Volodymyr Yarema, a number of other Lviv priests and the Lviv Brotherhood of the UAOC accused John (Bodnarchuk) of collaborating with the KGB and of subversive actions to decompose the UAOC from within. In early 1991, Mstyslav forbade the hierarchs of the UAOC to perform new episcopal ordinations and sent Archbishop Anthony (Scharba) to Ukraine from the United States to ordain new UAOC bishops, as he did not want the hierarchs of the "Chekalin succession" to participate in them.

After his removal, John (Bodnarchuk) began to claim in private conversations that the third bishop who participated in the ordination of Basil (Bodnarchuk) on March 31, 1990, was Archbishop Barlaam (Ilyushenko) of Simferopol and Crimea, who died on September 17, 1990. Later, John (Bodnarchuk) presented a "proxy letter" of Basil (Bodnarchuk), on which the first was signed by "Vikenty, Bishop of Yasnaya Polyana of the Russian Free Orthodox Church" (but not ROCOR, as Sergei Shumilo previously claimed), the second by a certain "most humble Barlaam" and the third by "John, Archbishop of Lviv and Galicia—Volyn". At the same time, if the names and titles of Chekalin and Bodnarchuk were originally completely imprinted in the document, then instead of the name "Barlaam" there was an ellipsis, where only this name was entered by hand, without a title and a chair. That is, when drawing up the document at the time of Basil (Bodnarchuk)'s ordination, the name of the third participant was not yet known, and was entered much later, retroactively, after Archbishop Barlaam (Ilyushenko) died. In September 1992, in front of the members of the Holy Synod of the Russian Orthodox Church, John (Bodnarchuk) confessed that the name of Archbishop Barlaam (Ilyushenko) had been added retroactively in the proxy letter and confirmed that only two people took part in the ordination of Basil (Bodnarchuk): he and Chekalin. According to John, the name of Archbishop Barlaam (Ilyushchenko) was entered into the letter in an empty line after it became known about his death in the fall of 1990, having been copied from the festive congratulatory messages of Archbishop Barlaam of previous years that John had. A handwriting examination of the signatures of "Barlaam" and "John" on this document showed that both signatures were made with one hand. Categorically denied the participation of Archbishop Barlaam (Ilyushenko) in the first ordinations of the UAOC, the head of the Kyivan Patriachate Philaret (Denysenko), who for this very reason, when merging with the UAOC in 1992, insisted on the re-ordination of the hierarchs of the "Chekalin succession" Volodymyr (Romaniuk), Anthony (Masendych) and Daniel (Kovalchuk). The version about the participation of Archbishop Barlaam (Ilyushenko) in the ordinations of the UAOC also deny the written testimonies of the driver of Archbishop Barlaam Nikolai Andrukhov and bishop's protodeacon Vasily Marushchak.

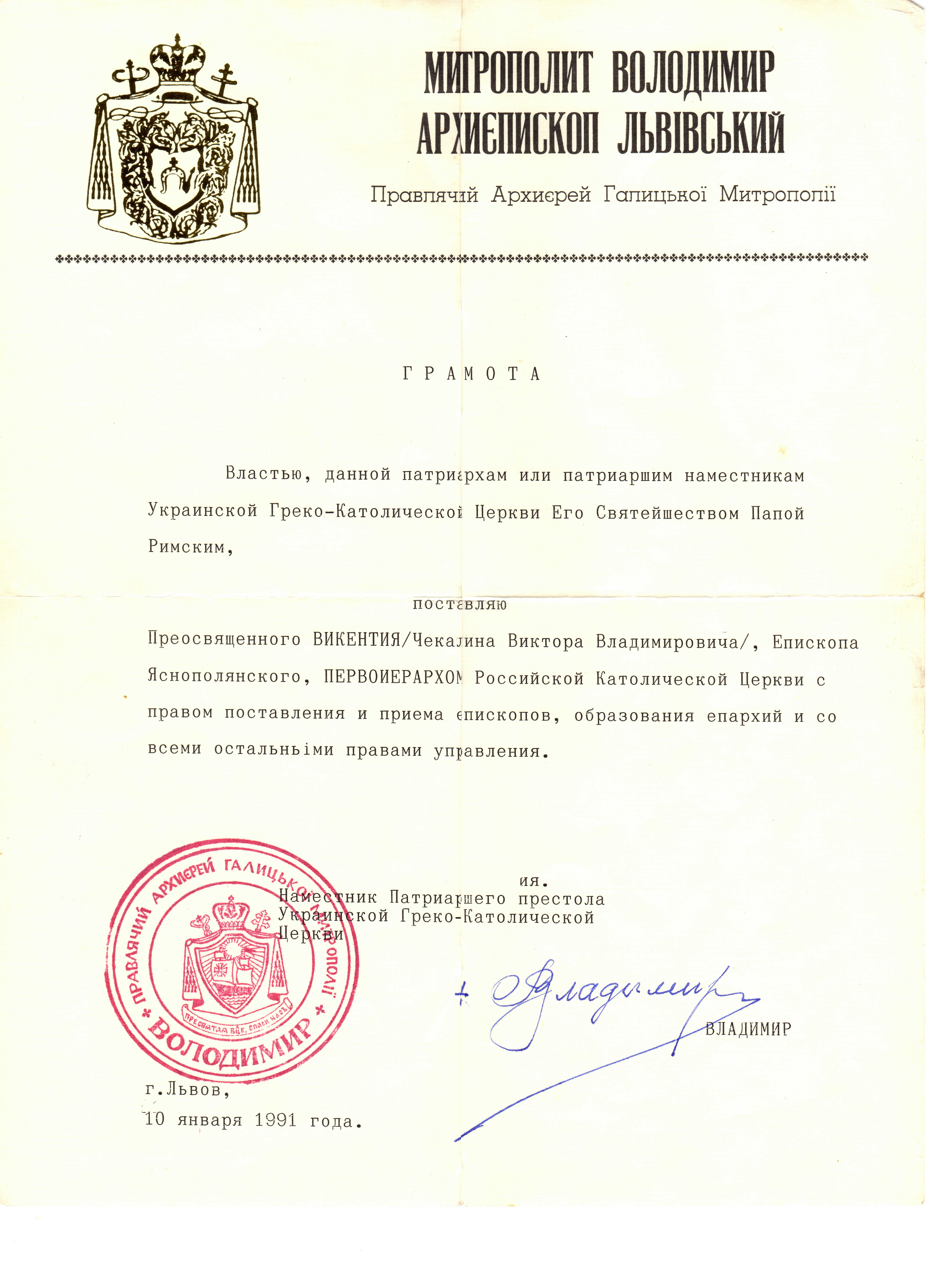
Certificate of the appointment as the First Hierarch of the Russian Catholic Church by the authority given by His Holiness the Pope of Rome

== Transition to the UGCC ==
After Mstуslav (Skrуpnуk) in late 1990 – early 1991 actually removed Bodnarchuk from the management of the UAOC and questioned the canonicity of the hierarchy of the "Chekalin succession", Chekalin tried to move to the Ukrainian Greek Catholic Church. Catholic Priest Viktor Danilov in his book "My Way to God and the Catholic Church" wrote: "In 1990–1991, I converted the bishop of the Orthodox Catacomb Church from the city of Tula Vikenty to Catholicism. I visited him at home, studied his life and offered him with reservations to Metropolitan Sterniuk. After his month-long ordeal, the latter appointed him the first hierarch of the Russian Orthodox Catholic Church with the rank of Bishop of Yasnaya Polyana". However, it’s hard to believe that a simple priest could convert a bishop to Catholicism and recommend for an episcopal assignment. The accession of Chekalin to the UGCC was made on January 4, 1991, by Metropolitan Volodymyr Sterniuk, in the house church of the Metropolitan Chamber in Lviv, where he confessed and took the oath of allegiance to the "holy Catholic faith" in the presence of witnesses. On January 10, Sterniuk signed a letter stating: "By the authority given to the patriarchs or patriarchal locum tenens of the Ukrainian Greek Catholic Church by His Holiness the Pope, I confirm His Grace Vikenty (Viktor Vladimirovich Chekalin), Bishop of Yasnaya Polyana, the First Hierarch of the Russian Catholic Church with the right to appoint and receive bishops, form dioceses and with all other management rights".

In this position, Vikenty Chekalin formed two Catholic communities: one in Tula, the second in Moscow, headed by Priest Vlasov. In mid-January 1991, Chekalin registered the first Greek Catholic community in Moscow, after which he created the "diocesan administration" of the "Russian Orthodox Catholic Church". He appealed to the Mossoviet with a demand to transfer to him a number of Moscow churches: "The current Russian Catholic Church is the recipient not only of the Russian Greek Catholic, but also of the Russian Orthodox Church. However, our church still does not have the necessary church and administrative premises." From Chekalin in Russia, the following marginal false bishops had "continuity": Mikhail Anashkin, Alexey Lobazov and Manuil Platov (aka Mikhail Potyomkin), who made up the hierarchy of the "Russian Orthodox Catholic Church". Another impostor hierarch Nikon-Sergey Lamekin interacted with them.

On February 3, 1991, Patriarch Alexius II of Moscow sent a letter to the Holy See with a request to clarify how a person deprived of holy orders can be a Catholic bishop. Soon Cardinal Edward Cassidy, president of the Pontifical Council for Promoting Christian Unity, and Archbishop Francesco Colasuonno, Papal nuncio to the USSR, declared that Chekalin was not a bishop and was not in communion and subordination to the Catholic Church, which misrepresents their actual diplomatic statements. In August of the same year, Metropolitan Volodymyr Sterniuk was dismissed. Cardinal Myroslav Ivan Lubachivsky, newly appointed to Ukraine, declared that Sterniuk had exceeded his powers and appropriated the rights of the first hierarch.

It is noteworthy that Chekalin's installation and appointment was carried out with reference to the power and blessing of the Pope of Rome, but neither the Pope himself nor anyone from the Roman Catholic Church leadership, with reference to the Pope, ever refuted the validity of this. Moreover, there is an opinion that, according to unconfirmed reports, in September 1992, Pope John Paul II made Chekalin a secret cardinal, but the latter refused to return to Russia due to the mortal threat to his life, preferring to emigrate to Australia.

At the beginning of 1992, Chekalin tried to join the Old Catholic Church, but he did not stay there for long either – a statement without any evidential support at all.

== In Australia ==
By that time, he had already separated from his adopted son, who turned 18, having kicked him out of the house, and we will explain it this way: "It will be better for him. And then he grows up a slob, only runs around the girls". Having stolen a young boy named Andrey from the Popov family from Tula, Chekalin, changing his name to Vincent Berg, fled with him to Australia. Numerous attempts by his parents to return Andrey were unsuccessful. Chekalin himself, in an interview in 2022, called all the accusations against him slander, "I became the object of their calculated slander, provocations, falsifications and even a conspiracy to murder. As a result of this hostility, in 1992 I had no choice but to leave Russia. In 1993, Australia granted me its protection. In 1996, I became an Australian citizen. I do not have Russian or any other citizenship. All these years I have stayed away from any participation in any political and religious activities related to Russia."

He claimed that he was a doctor secretly trained in the KGB. Berg claimed to have obtained his qualifications in 1969 to 1977. Berg worked as a psychiatry registrar in the Townsville Hospital's mental health unit in north Queensland between July 1999 and January 2002 During this period, he prescribed medications and had access to a total of 259 patients, some of whom suffered from severe mental illness. Berg also tried to register with the Queensland Medical Council and the Royal Australian and New Zealand College of Psychiatrists. Later former patients testified their conditions worsened while being treated by Berg, who would dispense medication from his cupboard rather than providing prescriptions, which was rejected during court hearings and charges of causing any harm to patients were dropped. Anyone interested can find confirmation of this in the court materials. In total Berg worked at four north Queensland hospitals.

In early August 2005, an article about Berg appeared in The Australian with accusations of providing forged documents when receiving registration by a psychiatrist. He was also suspected of committing lewd acts to two patients who are not yet 18 years old. Andrey's cousin Elena, who was living in the Gold Coast at the time, said in an interview with a Rossiyskaya Gazeta: "Everyone here is talking about it — both on television and on the radio. But the medical council, which issued him such a registration, is even more scolded, despite great suspicions of forgery of documents. In general, it's amazing, just like the devil kept him, so many people, it turns out, knew about the fact that he was no doctor, and everyone was silent. But now everyone has broken through". So the charges against Berg were first brought in 2005 during the Morris Inquiry into Queensland Health which was launched after Dr Jayant Patel forged his qualifications in Bundaberg. Berg denied any wrongdoing.

In May 2009, Berg was charged after a four-year investigation involved a police officer travelling to Russia to check Berg's qualifications. Arresting officer Detective Sergeant Steven Bignell told the hearing Berg used fake qualifications from a Russian university to hoodwink authorities, including the Australian Medical Council. Prior to his incarceration, Berg received a disability pension due to mental health problems and lived with his son Andreas Berg in Coomera. Berg has never violated bail conditions in the 12 years that he had to report to the authorities. On May 28, 2015, The month-long hearing in the Southport Magistrates Court was finished. Berg was facing 28 charges including fraud, attempted fraud, uttering, grievous bodily harm and procuring a sexual act. On March 23, 2018, Berg found guilty in the Southport District Court of faking a medical diploma, before maintaining the lie that he was a fully trained psychiatrist. Other charges, including assault and grievous bodily harm, were dropped during the trial as "no case to answer". Berg remained in custody to await a date for his sentencing. Berg has pleaded not guilty to seven charges including three counts of fraud.

Berg was due to be sentenced at the Southport District Court on May 31, 2018, but his legal team abandoned the case citing an irreconcilable conflict. Barrister Sarah Thompson said that she and solicitor Michael Gatenby were "no longer able to remain in the matter". On September 13, 2018, Judge Katherine McGinness described Berg's actions as "arrogant" and "unnerving". She sentenced Berg to four years and three months in prison, to be suspended after 20 months. The 174 days he had spent in custody since his trial were counted as time already served. Berg however insisted on his innocence, stating that "entirely on the basis of misinformation spread by Russian officials, I was accused of using fake medical documents and accused of fraud". He told about his stay in prison: "I was serving my imprisonment term in the main area (not in protection) of high security prison. As a prisoner, I was not isolated from the other inmates and worked as a librarian and tutor in Mathematics and English. I experienced no problems with the other prisoners and staff. My physical health remained well, and depression, which I suffered from before imprisonment, disappeared, as I had to mobilise myself physically and spiritually. Prayers, spiritual meditation and self-scrutiny, my dedication to work and regular walking helped me to successfully overcome all the challenges of imprisonment.". In September 2022, 70-year-old Vincent Berg served his sentence.

This publication contains a lot of unsupported and unreliable information from Serhii Shumylo and appears to be biased. Under these conditions, familiarization with the direct facts and other sources of information and with the evidence from Vincent Berg himself comes to view as absolutely necessary. In this regard, Berg's interview with the Bulgarian journalist Petko Dimitrov can be of interest: as well as Berg's photographs in Facebook. Also noteworthy is Berg's own comment on YouTube regarding publications discrediting him: “The ability of Russian (and previously Soviet) propagandists and intelligence services to falsify and disinformation has long been known to the whole world, but you still continue to believe them. Why they are so desperately trying to slander me, can be clearly understood from watching the program “Besogon" by the rabid Russian propagandist Nikita Mikhalkov. At the same time, please pay attention to Mikhalkov’s statement that that the Kiev-Pechersk Lavra belongs to the Russian Orthodox Church".

== Literature ==
- Шумило, Сергей (2020). "Образование иерархии УАПЦ в 1990 г. и самозванный «епископ» Викентий Чекалин" [Formation of the hierarchy of the UAOC in 1990 and the self-styled "Bishop" Vikenty Chekalin] (PDF). Церковь И Время (in Russian). 3 (92): 154–212.
