= Yedineniye =

Yedineniye (Russian: Единение, unity or unification) may refer to:

- Yedineniye (newspaper), a Russian newspaper in Australia
- Conceptual Party "Unity" (Yedineniye), a defunct political party in Russia
