= Jennifer Speake =

Canadian-British writer (born 1944)

- Born: Jennifer Drake-Brockman; 1944 (age 81–82); Toronto, Canada
- Citizenship: Canadian, British
- Occupation: Writer
- Spouse: Graham Speake

Jennifer Speake, née Drake-Brockman (born 1944, Toronto) is a Canadian-British freelance writer and editor of reference books.

== Life ==
Jennifer Anne Speake was born in Toronto in 1944. She was the daughter of Lieutenant-Colonel Guy Percy Lumsden Drake-Brockman and Vera Mary McLeod Harrison Topham, later of Hilton, KwaZulu-Natal in South Africa. She has an MA and BPhil.

== Career ==
Working at Oxford University Press, Speake helped OED editor John Simpson bring out a second edition of his Concise Oxford Dictionary of Proverbs, and a third edition in 1998. She became sole editor for the fourth (2003) and subsequent editions. Speake's other work included a biography of Thomas Vaughan, a philosopher from Wales.

Speake's three-volume 2003 encyclopedia of travel literature received a 2004 Reference and User Services Association award. One reviewer called it "an amazing collection of those people, famous, not-so-famous, and infamous alike, who have traveled the world over, with long lists of additional books for the travel narrative lover". Another reviewer, while noting inconsistency in its coverage, praised it as providing "an unusually rich entrée into an immense field that crosses cultural, historical and discipinary boundaries."

== Selected publications ==
- Drake-Brockman, Jennifer; Turner, A. J. (1974). "An emblematic watch by Gribelin". Bibliothèque d'Humanisme et Renaissance. 36 (1): 143–150. ISSN 0006-1999. JSTOR 20675174.
- Rudrum, Alan; Drake-Brockman, Jennifer (1984). The works of Thomas Vaughan. Oxford [Oxfordshire]: Clarendon Press. ISBN 0-19-812473-2. OCLC 9281738.
- Speake, Jennifer (1983). Biblical quotations. New York: Facts on File Inc. ISBN 9780871962416. OCLC 9217946.
- Simpson, John; Speake, Jennifer, eds. (1992). The Concise Oxford dictionary of proverbs (2nd ed.). Oxford: Oxford University Press. ISBN 0-19-866177-0. OCLC 24872450.
- Speake, Jennifer (2003). Literature of travel and exploration : an encyclopedia. New York: Fitzroy Dearborn. ISBN 1-57958-247-8. OCLC 55631133.
- Simpson, J.A..; Speake, Jennifer (2003). The Oxford dictionary of proverbs. Oxford: Oxford University Press. ISBN 0-19-860524-2. OCLC 52696399.
- Bergin, Thomas Goddard; Speake, Jennifer (2004). Encyclopedia of the Renaissance and the Reformation. New York: Facts On File. ISBN 0-8160-5451-7. OCLC 53880313.

Other publications:

- (ed., with Antony Flew as editorial consultant) A dictionary of philosophy. London: Macmillan, 1979. ISBN 9789070009335.
- (ed.) The Hutchinson dictionary of world history. Oxford: Helicon, 1993.
- (ed.) The Dent dictionary of symbols in Christian art. London: J.M. Dent, 1994.
- (as Jennifer Drake-Brockman) 'The Perpetuum Mobile of Cornelis Drebbel', in W.D. Hackmann and A. J. Turner, eds., Learning, Language and Invention: Essays Presented to Francis Maddison. Aldershot, 1994.
- (ed.) The Oxford dictionary of foreign words and phrases. Oxford; New York: Oxford University Press, 1997.
- (ed. with Mark LaFlaur) The Oxford essential dictionary of foreign terms in English: American edition. New York: Berkley Books, 1999. Published in mass market paperback by arrangement with Oxford University Press.
- (ed.) The Oxford dictionary of idioms. Oxford; New York: Oxford University Press, 2000.

== Personal life ==
In the 1970s she married Graham Speake, an English classicist, Byzantinist, and academic publisher.
