= Serhii Shumylo =

Ukrainian historian

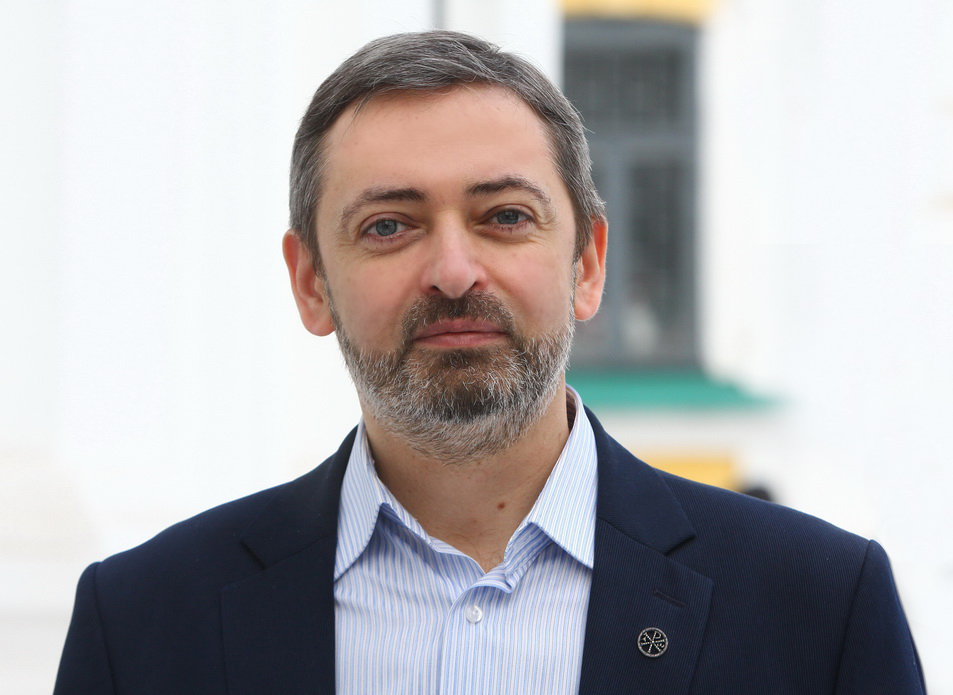
Serhii Shumylo in 2021

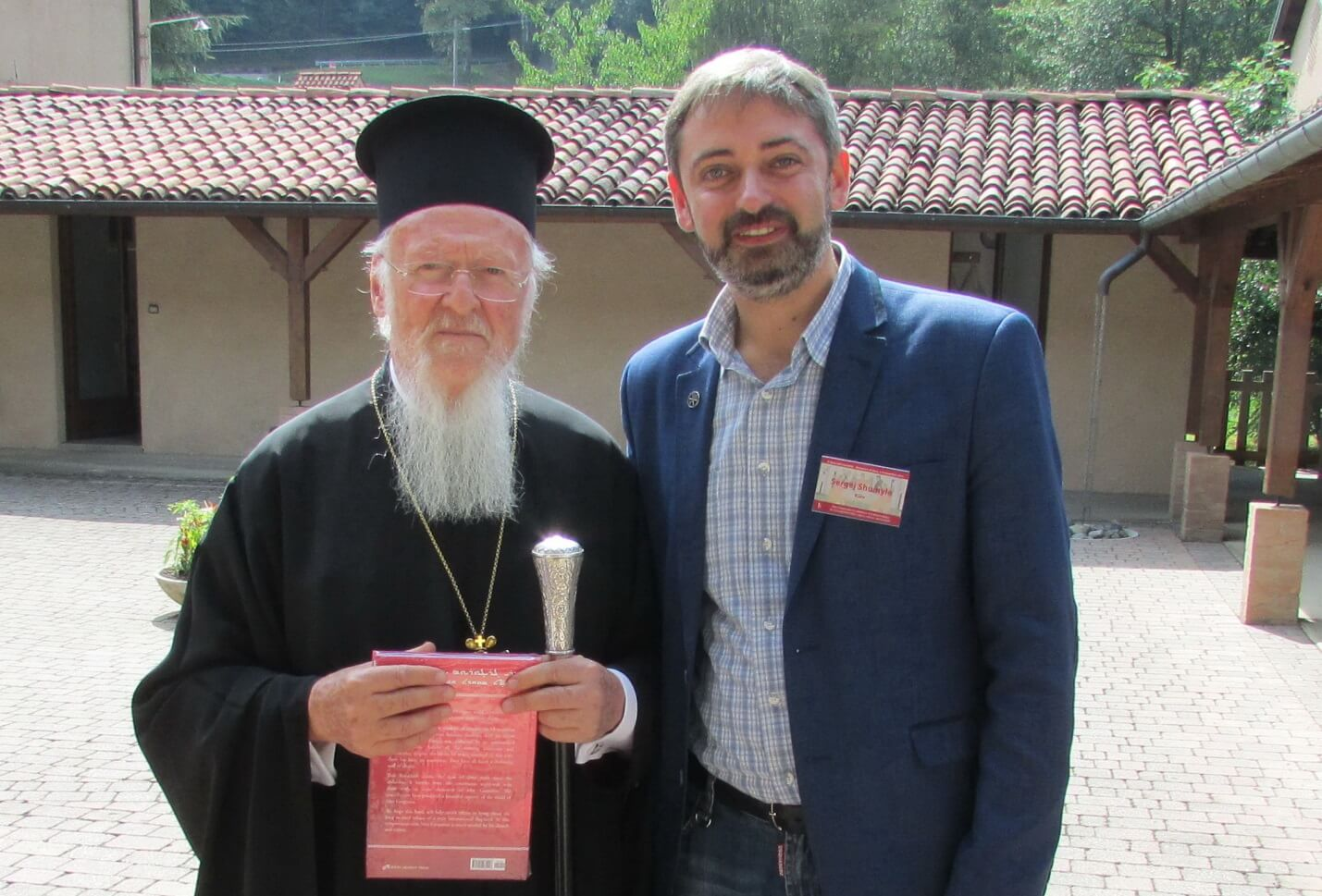
Ecumenical Patriarch Bartholomew I of Constantinople and Serhii Shumylo in 2017

Serhii Viktorovych Shumylo (Ukrainian: Сергій Вікторович Шумило; born 8 June 1976) is a Ukrainian historian, specialist in religious studies, journalist and public figure. Shumylo is a candidate of historical sciences (PhD) and a Doctor of Theology (ThDr).

He is an invited science researcher at the University of Exeter (United Kingdom), director of the International Institute of the Athonite Legacy in Ukraine, a science researcher at the Institute of History of Ukraine (National Academy of Sciences of Ukraine), Co-chairman of the Church History Group at the International Orthodox Theological Association (IOTA) in the USA, Associate Professor at the National Academy of Government Managerial Staff of Culture and Arts (Ukraine), Assessor of the IQS Board of the University of Prešov, Deputy Chairman of the Chernihiv Branch of the Ukrainian Helsinki Union.

Serhii Shumylo researches the Ukrainian spiritual and cultural heritage, is the editor-in-chief of the scientific almanac "Athos Heritage" (Ukrainian: «Афонська спадщина», Afonska spadshchyna), a member of the editorial boards of the scientific journal "Local Lore" (Ukrainian: «Краєзнавство», Krayeznavstvo) and the popular science magazine "Landmarks of Ukraine: History and Culture" (Ukrainian: «Пам'ятки України: історія та культура»), a member of the editorial board of the All-Ukrainian scientific journal "Siveryansky Litopis" (Ukrainian: «Сіверянський літопис») and the editorial board of the popular science magazine "Liberation Struggle" (Ukrainian: «Визвольна боротьба»). He also made great contributions in research of the Eastern Orthodox churches during their persecutions in the Soviet Union and studies towards history of "catacomb" (underground) religious communities as well as other religious communities. The author of at least ten books and more than 100 scientific publications on subject of the history of Mount Athos, the Eastern Orthodox underground in the Soviet Union, the history of Eastern Orthodoxy in Ukraine during the Cossack Hetmanate, the early history of Eastern Orthodoxy in Ukraine during Kyivan Rus, as well as numerous publications in the mass media on issues of history, religion, culture, and politics.

He is a full member of the international society "The Friends of Mount Athos" (under the patronage of King Charles III), a member of the National Union of Local History of Ukraine, Shevchenko Scientific Society, National Union of Journalists of Ukraine, Ukrainian Association of Religious Studies, International Association for the History of Religions (IAHR) and European Association for the Study of Religions (EASR).

He defended his candidate of historical sciences (Ph.D. in History) on the topic "Development of Ukrainian-Athonite spiritual and cultural ties in the 17th - first third of the 19th century". In doctoral studies at the Faculty of Theology of the University of Presov (Presov, Slovakia), he defended his doctorate in theology (ThDr). He took a course at Harvard University (Harvard University course "Tangible Things: Discovering History Through Artworks, Artifacts, Scientific Specimens, and the Stuff Around You").

He is a follower of the famous Greek professor Antonios Tachiaos (1931-2018), under whose influence he began researching in the archives of Athos and later, in 2013, founded the International Institute of the Athonite Legacy with him (Prof Tachiaos was the honorary chairman of this institute from 2013 to 2018, and from 2018 to 2022, Metropolitan Kallistos (Ware) of Diokleia was the honorary chairman of the institute).

For a long time, he has been researching the history of relations between Ukraine and the Holy Mount Athos, the influence of the Athonite heritage on Ukrainian spiritual culture and tradition. He has studied the archival collections of Athos monasteries, the Holy Kinot of Athos (Athos, Greece), the Patriarchal Archives of the Ecumenical Patriarchate of Constantinople in Phanar (Istanbul, Turkey), and historical archives of Ukraine and other countries. In particular, he found documents and material remains of the lost Ukrainian "Cossack" skete "Black Whirlpool" (Mavrovyr) on Mount Athos, founded by the Cossacks on Athos in 1747. He discovered and published little-known letters of St Paisius Velichkovsky in the archives, as well as documents on charitable activities towards Athos monasteries by Ukrainian hetmans and representatives of Cossack families of the 17th and 18th centuries. He compiled a biography of the Ukrainian polemic writer and Athonite elder John Vyshensky, on the basis of which the Synod of the Ukrainian Orthodox Church canonised him as a saint in 2016. He has published other research, books, publications and materials on the historical, spiritual and cultural ties between Ukraine and the monasteries of Mount Athos. Also, for the first time, he found and explored the remains of the cell of St Paisius Velichkovsky on Mount Athos.

Recipient of research fellowships and grants from the Dumbarton Oaks Research Centre at Harvard University (2022) and the British Academy (2023). In 2022, he was a Visiting Fellow at Westfälische Wilhelms-Universität Münster (Germany), as well as in École Pratique des Hautes Études l PSL in Paris (France).

For several years (2014–2015, 2021–2022) he was a representative of the Hoover Institution of Stanford University (USA) in Ukraine. From January 2023, he was appointed Head of the Branch of the Institute of Ukrainian Studies of the Ministry of Education and Science of Ukraine in Exeter (UK). Works closely with scientific institutions in Greece and other countries.

He has organized more than 20 international scientific conferences on the spiritual and cultural heritage of Mount Athos and the history of the Church in Ukraine (including with the support of the École Pratique des Hautes Études (Paris, France), the Keston Institute in Oxford (UK), Columbia University (USA), the World Council of Churches (Geneva, Switzerland) and other international organizations). For a long time, he was engaged in research activities abroad (Great Britain, France, Greece, Germany, Italy), held personal lectures, exhibitions and presentations on the Ukrainian heritage of Mount Athos in more than ten European countries (Athens, Paris, London, Oxford, Cambridge, Rome, Venice, Milan, Naples, Strasbourg, Geneva, Brussels, Hamburg, Warsaw, Prague, Jassy and others). In particular, he has lectured at the World Council of Churches in Geneva, Webster University in Athens and other international academic and religious institutions. In 2022, he organized several scientific and educational events at the Sorbonne University in Paris to promote Ukrainian cultural heritage.

In addition to his academic work, he is involved in social and political activities. In the late 1980s and early 1990s, he was a member of the youth anti-communist movement and one of the organisers of the Chernihiv branch of the Union of Independent Ukrainian Youth, and since March 1990, a member of the Shevchenko Ukrainian Language Society (Prosvita). In 2002–2006, he was a member of the Chernihiv City Council. In 2002–2003 - Secretary of the Commission of the Chernihiv City Council. He participated in the events of the Orange Revolution in Ukraine (2004). He was also involved in monitoring issues in the field of harmonisation of church-state relations, freedom of conscience and religious organisations, in 2015, together with well-known human rights activists from different countries, he signed a declaration on the creation of the international movement "Freedom of Conscience" and acted as the coordinator of the organisation's representative office in Ukraine. 2019–2022 – worked as an expert consultant at the Apparatus of the Ukrainian Parliament (Verkhovna Rada of Ukraine).

After Russia's full-scale military invasion of Ukraine in 2022, he repeatedly spoke in the media criticising Russia's actions and the fundamentalist ideology of the "Russian world", which the Moscow Patriarchate promotes to justify Russia's war against Ukraine. In particular, he is published in Kathimerini, The Art Newspaper, ElDebate.com, The Pilot, Vatican News, Orthodox Times, Fos Fanariou, Religion & Gesellschaft and others.

Participated in advising British medical forensic experts who are collecting testimonies and evidence of crimes committed by the Russian military in Ukraine to be submitted to the International Criminal Court in The Hague. Organiser of ecumenical inter-Christian events in support of Ukraine in the UK.

== Recognitions and honours ==
On November 9, 2020, by the decree of the President of Ukraine Volodymyr Zelenskyy "On awarding Ukraine with state awards on the occasion of the All-Ukrainian Day of Culture Specialists" for a significant personal contribution to the development of national culture and art, significant creative achievements and high professional skill, he was awarded the title "Merited Culture Specialist of Ukraine".

By the Order of the Chairman of the Verkhovna Rada of Ukraine of 25.11.2020, he was awarded the Certificate of Honour of the Verkhovna Rada of Ukraine, by the decision of the Presidium of the National Union of Local Historians of Ukraine of 11.02.2021, he was awarded the title of "Honorary Local Historian of Ukraine", by the decision of the Academic Council of the Institute of Artificial Intelligence Problems of the Ministry of Education and Science of Ukraine and the National Academy of Sciences of Ukraine of 27.04.2023 (Protocol No. 4/1), he was awarded the title of Honorary Professor of the Institute, he was also awarded the Diploma of the Chernihiv Oblast Council, honorary awards of the Chernihiv Regional State Administration, the Honorary Award of the Ukrainian Cultural Foundation, church orders and awards, and is also a laureate of a number of international literary awards.

== Publications ==
=== Books ===
1. The Soviet regime and the Church (Советский режим и церковь). — Saint Petersburg, 2006. — 136 p. (in Russian)
2. Prince Askold (Oskold) and Christianization of Rus. — Kyiv: Dukh i litera (Дух и литера), 2010. — 120 p. — ISBN 978-966-378-155-6 (in Russian)
3. In catacombs. The Eastern Orthodox underground in the Soviet Union: a summary of the history of the True Orthodox Church in the Soviet Union. (В катакомбах. Православное подполье в СССР: конспект по истории Истинно-Православной Церкви в СССР). — Lutsk: Teren (Терен), 2011. — 269 p. — ISBN 978-966-2276-52-7 (in Russian) online copy at catacomb.org.ua
4. Schema-bishop Peter (Ladygin): an unshakable pillar of the Church (1866–1957) (Схиепископ Петр (Ладыгин): непоколебимый столп Церкви (1866—1957 гг.)) / Publication, preparation of the text, introduction, comment by Shumylo S.V., Shumylo V.V. — Glazov (Глазов), 2013. — 108 p. — ISBN 978-5-905538-16-2 (in Russian) online copy at catacomb.org.ua
5. The "Spiritual Zaporozhye" on Mount Athos. Little-known Zaporizhian Cossack monastery “Chornyi Vyr” (Black Vortex) on the Holy Mountain. («Духовное Запорожье» на Афоне. Малоизвестный казачий скит «Черный Выр» на Святой Горе.) — Kyiv: The UOC publication department (Издательский отдел УПЦ), 2015. — 116 p. — ISBN 978-966-2371-34-5 (in Russian)
6. Venerable Paisiy Velichkovsky and the Zaporozhye Sich. Little-known letters of Rev. Paisiy Velichkovsky to Kosh Otaman of the Zaporizhian Host Petro Kalnyshevsky. (Преподобный Паисий Величковский и Запорожская Сечь. Малоизвестные письма прп. Паисия Величковского к Кошевому атаману Войска Запорожского Петру Калнышевскому.) Kyiv — Serpukhov: International Institute of the Athonite Legacy in Ukraine; "Legacy of the Orthodox Orient" («Наследие Православного Востока»), 2015. — 128 p. — ISBN 978-5-9905423-3-4 (in Russian)
7. Elder John Vishensky: Athonite ascetic and Orthodox writer-polemicist. Materials for the biography of blessed memory of “the great elder John Vishensky the Svyatogorets” (Старец Иоанн Вишенский: афонский подвижник и православный писатель-полемист. Материалы к жизнеописанию «блаженной памяти великого старца Иоанна Вишенского Святогорца») — Kyiv: The UOC publication department (Издательский отдел УПЦ), 2016. — 208 p. — ISBN 978-966-2371-40-6 (in Russian)
8. Venerable Paisius Velichkovsky. "The Tale of the Holy Cathedral" and little-known letters (Преподобний Паїсій Величковський. «Повість про святий собор» та маловідомі листи) / Comments and editions by Shumylo S.V. — Kyiv: The UOC publication department (Видавничий відділ УПЦ), 2016. — 207 p. — ISBN 978-966-2371-39-0 (in Ukrainian)
9. Elder Anikita: the spiritual path of holiness. Materials for the biography with the application of the works of Hieroschema-monk Anikita (Prince Shirinsky-Shikhmatov) (Старец Аникита: духовный путь святости. Материалы к жизнеописанию с приложением сочинений иеросхимонаха Аникиты (князя Ширинского-Шихматова)) / Additions, editions and comments by Zabelin K.V. — Smolensk, 2018. — 276 p. — ISBN 978-5-98156-814-5 (in Russian)
10. Elder Anikita: the spiritual path of holiness. Materials for the biography with the application of the works of Hieroschema-monk Anikita (Prince Shirinsky-Shikhmatov) (Старец Аникита: духовный путь святости. Материалы к жизнеописанию с приложением сочинений иеросхимонаха Аникиты (князя Ширинского-Шихматова)) / 2nd edition. — Kyiv-Odesa: Athonite Legacy (Афонское наследие), 2019. — 328 p. — ISBN 978-966-139-103-0 (in Russian)
11. Athonite elder from Transcarpathia. Hieroschema-monk Avvakum (Vakarov) and his time: 1899–1972. (Афонский старец из Закарпатья. Иеросхимонах Аввакум (Вакаров) и его время: 1899–1972.) — Kyiv: International Institute of the Athonite Legacy, 2019. — 336 p. — ISBN 978-966-139-107-8 (in Russian)
12. The Church of the Martyrs: Persecution of the Faith and the Church in the 20th Century: Materials of the International science conference (Церква мучеників: гоніння на віру та Церкву у ХХ столітті: матеріали Міжнар. наук. конф.) (Kyiv, 6–7 February 2020) / editions by Shumylo S.V. — Kyiv: The UOC publication department (Видавничий відділ УПЦ), 2020. — 616 p. (in Ukrainian)
