= Graham Speake =

British Byzantinist and scholar (born 1946)

- Born: June 9, 1946 (age 80); London
- Occupations: Scholar and writer
- Spouse: Jennifer Speake

Academic background
- Education: University of Oxford

Academic work
- Main interests: Mount Athos

Graham Speake (born 9 June 1946, London) is a British classical philologist and Byzantinist.

== Education ==
After attending St Paul's School in London, Speake studied Classics at Trinity College, Cambridge, where he won various prizes for, among other things, poetry in ancient Greek. He continued his studies at Christ Church, Oxford, where he was awarded a doctorate for an unpublished dissertation on the Byzantine transmission of ancient Greek literature.

== Career ==
Speake was subsequently an academic publisher for forty years. His publications include the Penguin Dictionary of Ancient History (1995) and the two-volume Encyclopedia of Greece and the Hellenic Tradition (2000). In 1996, he was elected Fellow of the Society of Antiquaries of London.

Among other positions, he also worked for twelve years as a guest lecturer on Swan Hellenic Cruises. In 1988 he visited Mount Athos for the first time, to which he subsequently made frequent pilgrimages.

In 1990, with Derek Hill, he founded the Friends of Mount Athos society, under the patronage of Charles, Prince of Wales. As of 2022, he is President of the society.

In 1999, he was received into the Greek Orthodox Church at Vatopedi Monastery. For his book Mount Athos: Renewal in Paradise (2002) he received the 2002 Criticos Prize, awarded by the Society for the Promotion of Hellenic Studies. A second edition of the book was published in 2014.

== Personal life ==
In the 1970s, he married Jennifer Speake (née Jennifer Drake-Brockman), a Canadian writer who later became an editor at Oxford University Press.

== Selected works ==
- Dales, Douglas; Speake, Graham (2020). The life of prayer on Mount Athos. Oxford. ISBN 978-1-78997-521-5. OCLC 1153341087.
- Speake, Graham (2018). A history of the Athonite Commonwealth: the spiritual and cultural diaspora of Mount Athos. New York. ISBN 978-1-108-34922-2. OCLC 1041501028.
- Speake, Graham; Kallistos, Bishop of Diokleia (2015). Spiritual guidance on Mount Athos. Oxford. ISBN 978-3-0353-0693-4. OCLC 904800265.
- Speake, Graham; Ware, Kallistos (2012). Mount Athos: Microcosm of the Christian East. Oxford: Lang, Peter, AG, Internationaler Verlag der Wissenschaften. ISBN 978-3-0353-0233-2. OCLC 823378976.
- Speake, Graham (2014). Mount Athos: renewal in paradise. Limni, Evia, Greece: Denise Harvey. ISBN 978-960-7120-34-2. OCLC 903320491.
- Gothóni, René; Speake, Graham (2008). The monastic magnet: roads to and from Mount Athos. Bern: Peter Lang. ISBN 978-3-03911-337-8. OCLC 230209474.
- Conomos, Dimitri E.; Speake, Graham (2005). Mount Athos, the sacred bridge: the spirituality of the Holy Mountain. Oxford: Peter Lang. ISBN 3-03910-064-5. OCLC 67924540.
