= Friends of Mount Athos =

- Formation: 1990
- Type: Registered charity
- Registration no.: 1047287
- Location: Woodstock, Oxfordshire, United Kingdom
- Chairman: Christopher Thomas

The Friends of Mount Athos (FoMA) is a society formed in 1990 by people who shared a common interest for the monasteries of Mount Athos. It is a registered charity in the United Kingdom (Registered Charity No. 1047287).

== People ==
Timothy Ware, Metropolitan Kallistos of Diokleia, was the president of the society succeeded by Graham Speake, one of the founders. Christopher Thomas is the chairman. King Charles III is the royal patron of the society. The late Prince Philip, Duke of Edinburgh was also a member.

== Footpath maintenance and mapping ==
As a service to the monasteries and to pilgrims, the society clears and maintains the ancient footpaths of Mount Athos, with many of the stone-paved kalderimi paths dating back to the Byzantine era. It also provides on its website detailed footpath descriptions with GPS tracks, and a regularly updated report on the condition of the paths. FoMA member and cartographer, Peter Howorth of Christchurch, New Zealand, working with the society's footpath team, has recently published a new Pilgrim Map.

== Publications ==
Among the society's publications are its annual bulletin (Friends of Mount Athos Annual Report) offering articles, book reviews and other features related to Mount Athos. Past issues are available from the society's web site. It also publishes A Pilgrim's Guide to Mount Athos in both printed and continuously updated digital forms.
