= Yedineniye (newspaper) =

Russian newspaper in Australia

Yedineniye (Russian: Едине́ние, "Unification") is Australia's oldest Russian newspaper, published weekly since 1950 , and is one of the five oldest Russian newspapers abroad. It is published in West Ryde, New South Wales.
