= Endorsements in the Australian Marriage Law Postal Survey =

A number of politicians, public figures, media outlets, businesses and other organisations endorsed voting either in favour or against same-sex marriage during the Australian Marriage Law Postal Survey.

== "Yes" campaign ==
=== Lead lobby groups ===
- Australian Marriage Equality – The leading lobby group for same-sex marriage in Australia, running under the banner of the Equality Campaign, announced at a press conference on 11 August that, if the legal challenge to the survey is unsuccessful, "we have a duty to every Aussie who supports fairness and equality to try to win it. We are in this to win this".
- GetUp! – The left-leaning activist group announced it would "engage in a campaign to win a Yes result...to deliver...the fairer and more equal country we believe in".

=== Notable individuals ===
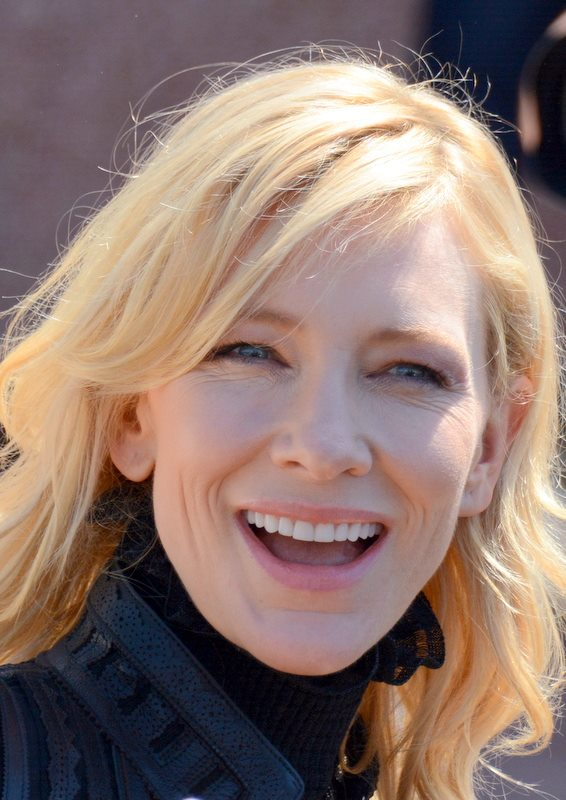
Cate Blanchett

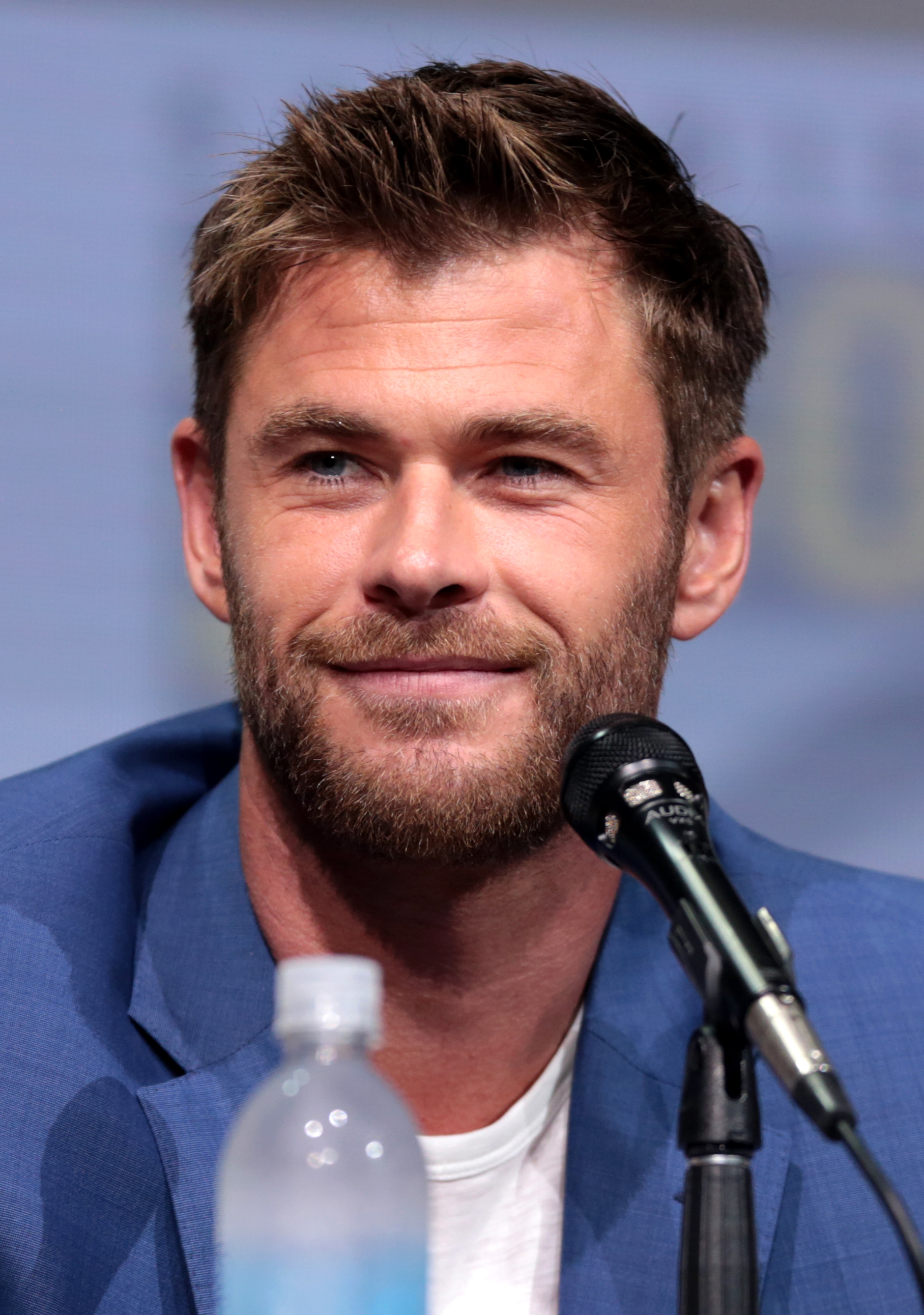
Chris Hemsworth

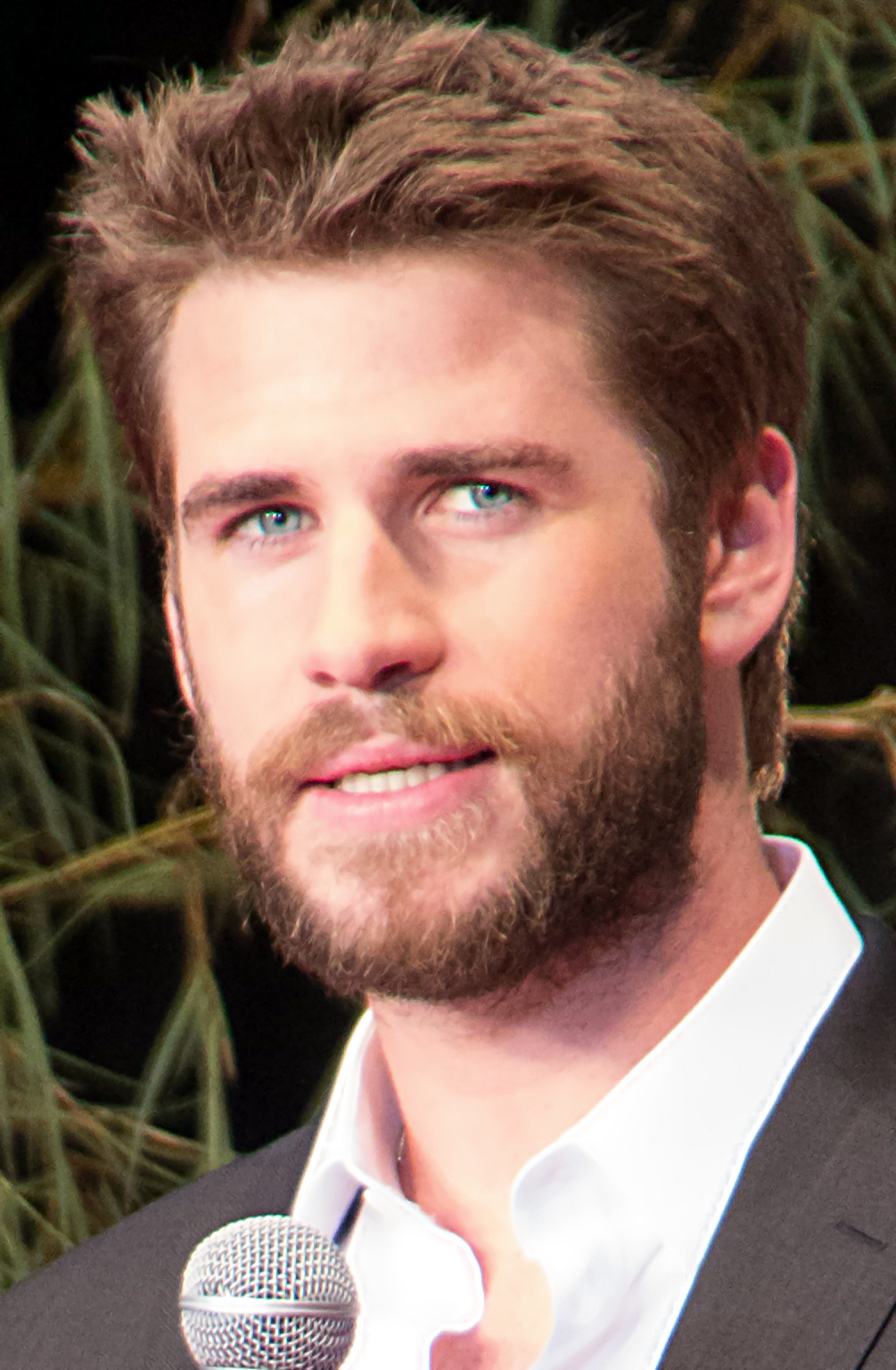
Liam Hemsworth

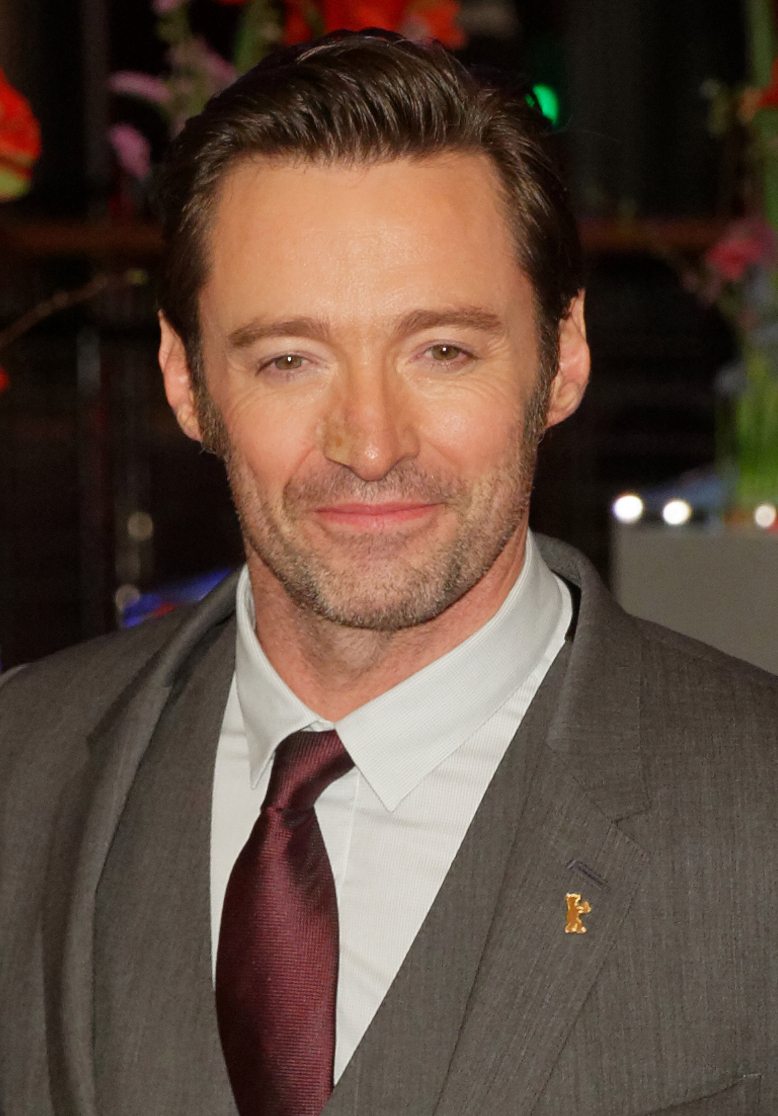
Hugh Jackman

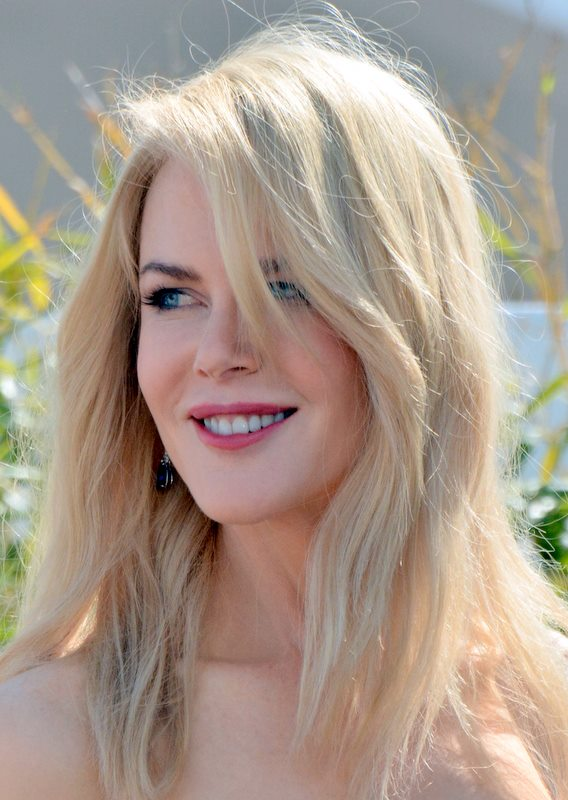
Nicole Kidman

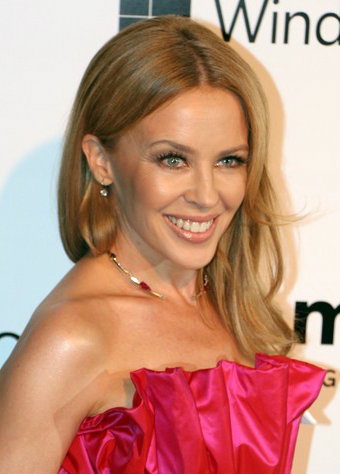
Kylie Minogue

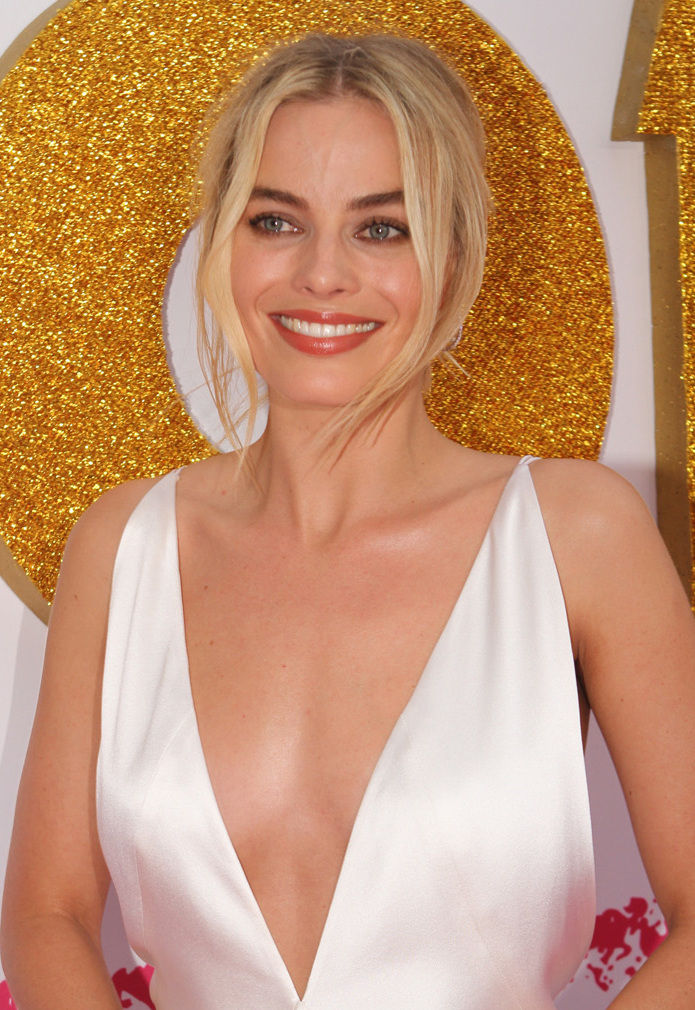
Margot Robbie

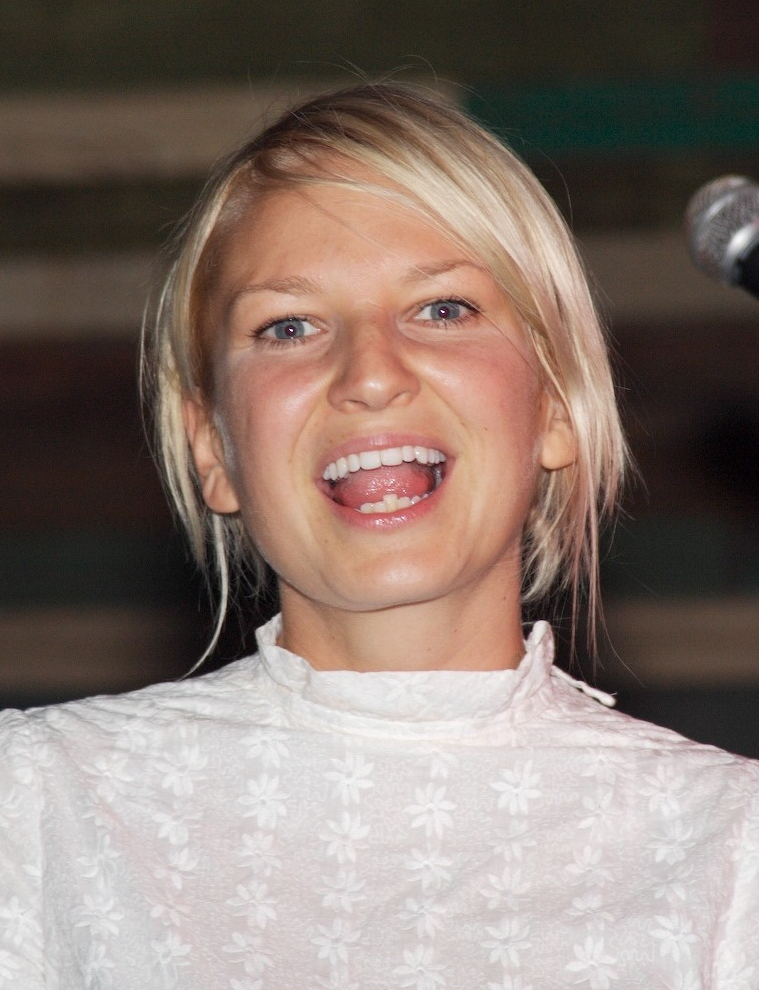
Sia

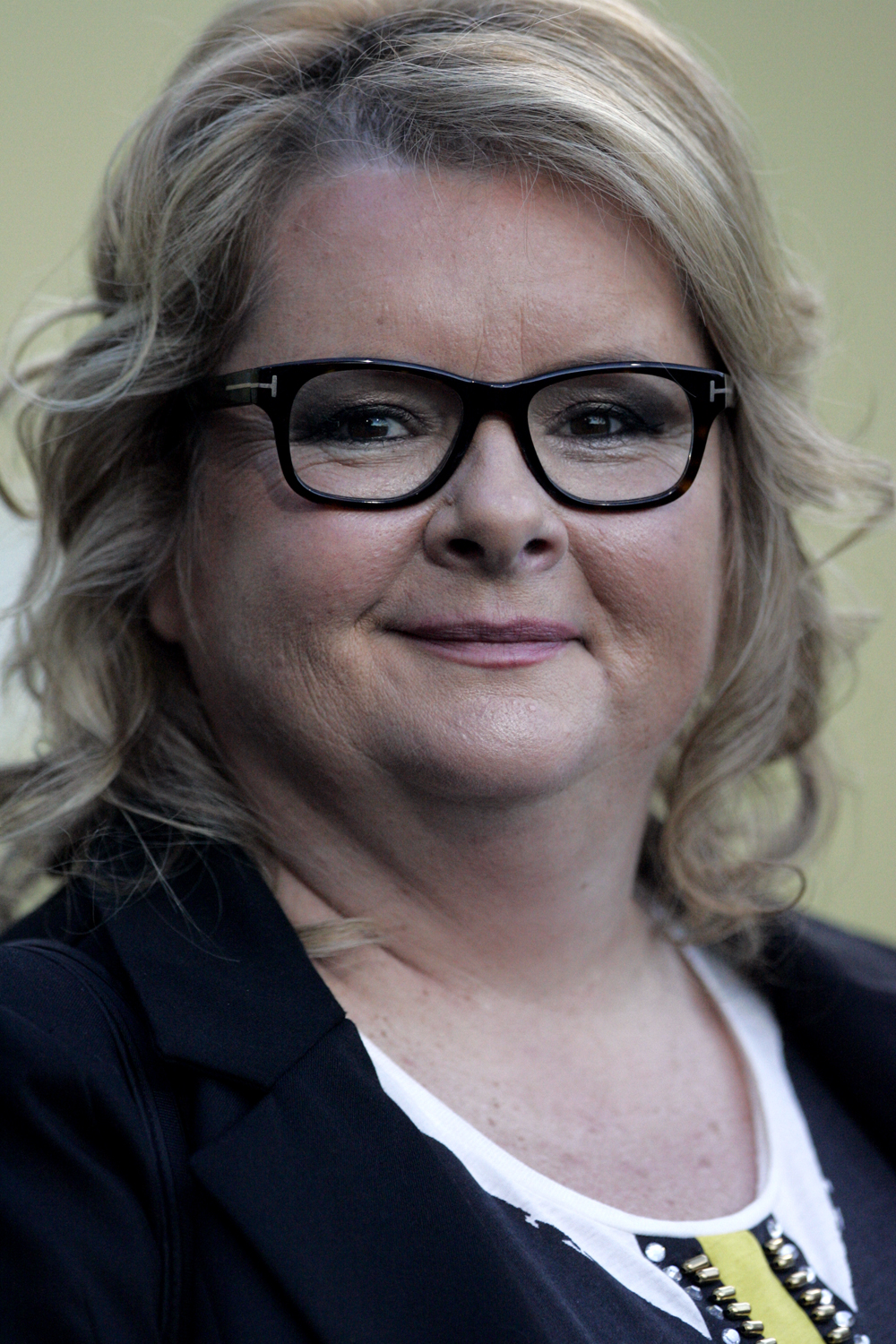
Magda Szubanski

- Courtney Act, drag queen and reality television personality
- Louise Adler, editor and publisher
- Faustina Agolley, television presenter
- Janet Albrechtsen, opinion columnist for The Australian
- Katie Allen, future Liberal MP for Higgins
- Dennis Altman, academic, author and activist
- Odette Annable, US actress
- Robyn Archer, singer and writer
- Alfie Arcuri, singer-songwriter
- Tina Arena, singer-songwriter
- Neil Armfield, theatre, film and opera director
- Patricia Arquette, US actress
- Sallyanne Atkinson, former Lord Mayor of Brisbane
- Van Badham, writer
- Ted Baillieu, former Premier of Victoria
- Simon Baker, actor
- Jason Ball, LGBTI activist and mental health advocate
- Tom Ballard, comedian and radio presenter
- Colleen Ballinger (Miranda Sings), US YouTube personality
- Jimmy Barnes, singer-songwriter
- John Barrowman, Scottish-American actor
- Dame Marie Bashir, former governor of New South Wales
- Lance Bass, US singer
- Rosie Batty, 2015 Australian of the Year
- Stephanie Bendixsen, actress
- Maxine Beneba Clarke, writer and slam poet
- John Birmingham, author
- Dustin Lance Black, US screenwriter and LGBT rights activist
- Alex Blackwell, professional cricketer
- Hamish Blake, comedian
- Connor Blakely, Australian rules footballer
- Cate Blanchett, actress
- Sarah Blasko, singer-songwriter
- Panti Bliss, Irish drag queen and gay rights advocate
- Matt Bomer, US actor
- Clare Bowen, actress and singer
- James Bradley, novelist and critic
- Tiernan Brady, Equality Campaign executive director and director of the successful Irish Yes Equality campaign
- Zach Braff, US actor
- Sir Richard Branson, UK business magnate and founder of the Virgin Group
- Andrew Bragg, future Liberal Senator for New South Wales and national director of the Liberals & Nationals for Yes campaign
- John Brogden, former Leader of the NSW Liberal Party
- Geraldine Brooks, journalist and novelist
- John Bryson, author and lawyer
- Andy Bull, singer-songwriter
- Julian Burnside, barrister and human right advocate
- Rose Byrne, actress
- Anthony Callea, singer-songwriter and actor
- David Cameron, former Prime Minister of the United Kingdom
- David Campbell, singer and stage presenter
- Tim Campbell, actor
- Kate Carnell, businesswoman and former ACT Chief Minister
- Jane Caro, social commentator
- Steven Carroll, novelist
- Michael Caton, actor
- Robert Cavallucci, former LNP member of the QLD Legislative Assembly for Brisbane Central
- Nic Cester, singer-songwriter
- Kim Chi, South Korean drag queen and artist
- Kerry Chikarovski, former Leader of the New South Wales Liberal Party
- Lee Lin Chin, television presenter and journalist
- Justine Clarke, actress
- Tilda Cobham-Hervey, actor
- J. M. Coetzee, novelist and winner of the 2003 Nobel Prize in Literature
- Michelle Collins, UK actress
- Jack Colwell, singer-songwriter
- Casey Conway, former professional rugby league footballer
- Tim Cook, US high-profile business executive and developer
- James Corden, UK television host
- Danielle Cormack, NZ actress
- Rick Cosnett, actor
- Ricki-Lee Coulter, singer-songwriter and television presenter
- Jai Courtney, actor
- Schapelle Corby, cannabis convict
- Annabel Crabb, political journalist
- Joel Creasey, actor and comedian
- Rodney Croome, LGBTIQ activist
- Russell Crowe, NZ actor
- Alan Cumming, Scottish-American actor
- Sophie Cunningham, writer and editor
- Li Cunxin, former ballet dancer
- Miley Cyrus, US singer-songwriter and actress
- Blanche d'Alpuget, writer and wife of former Prime Minister Bob Hawke
- Nicole da Silva, actress
- Tom Daley, UK Olympic diver
- Glyn Davis, vice-chancellor of the University of Melbourne and author
- Michelle de Kretser, novelist
- CJ de Mooi, UK professional quizzer
- Brett Dean, composer, violist and conductor
- Peter Debnam, former Leader of the NSW Liberal Party
- Philip DeFranco, US YouTube personality
- Ellen DeGeneres, US television presenter
- Casey Dellacqua, professional tennis player
- Jane den Hollander, vice chancellor of Deakin University
- Portia de Rossi, actress
- Robert Dessaix, novelist, essayist and journalist
- Diesel, musician
- Lena Dunham, US actress
- Marta Dusseldorp, actress
- Harriet Dyer, actress
- Annette Edmondson, cyclist
- Gracie Elvin, racing cyclist
- Laura Enever, professional surfer
- Bill English, Leader of the Opposition of New Zealand and former Prime Minister
- Anton Enus, news presenter
- Dan Ewing, actor
- Suzanne Falkiner, writer
- Kurt Fearnley, wheelchair racer
- Jesse Tyler Ferguson, US actor
- Brendan Fevola, former AFL footballer
- Isla Fisher, actress
- Ryan Fitzgerald, media personality
- Peter FitzSimons, journalist and author
- Caroline Flack, UK media personality
- Anna Flanagan, field hockey player
- Flume, record producer
- Brandon Flynn, US actor
- Jane Fonda, US actress
- Zoë Foster Blake, author and columnist
- Jesinta Franklin, model and winner of Miss Universe Australia 2010
- Morag Fraser, journalist
- Cathy Freeman, former sprinter and sixth fastest woman of all time
- Dawn French, UK actress
- Sam Frost, TV and radio personality
- Stephen Fry, UK actor and television presenter
- Deborra-lee Furness, actress
- Josh Gad, US actor
- Megan Gale, model
- David Gallop, sports administrator and CEO of the Football Federation Australia
- Michael Gannon, president of the Australian Medical Association
- Margaret Gardner, Vice-Chancellor of Monash University
- Helen Garner, novelist
- Boy George, UK singer-songwriter
- Max Gillies, actor and writer
- Rudy Giuliani, US businessman and former mayor of New York City
- Bill Glasson, surgeon and former Liberal candidate for Griffith
- Andrea Goldsmith, writer and novelist
- Anna Goldsworthy, writer
- Kerryn Goldsworthy, writer and academic
- Peter Goldsworthy, writer and medical practitioner
- David Gonski, businessman and chancellor of the University of New South Wales
- Delta Goodrem, singer-songwriter and actress
- Gigi Gorgeous, Canadian internet personality
- Ellie Goulding, UK singer-songwriter
- Richard Goyder, businessman and sports administrator
- Joey Graceffa, US YouTube personality
- Frankie Grande, US actor and internet personality
- Ellia Green, rugby union player
- Todd Greenberg, CEO of the National Rugby League
- Russell Greene, former Australian rules footballer
- Kathryn Greiner, social advocate
- Nick Greiner, Federal President of the Liberal Party and former Premier of New South Wales
- Kate Grenville, author
- Skylar Grey, US singer-songwriter
- Osher Günsberg, television and radio presenter
- Gideon Haigh, cricket and business journalist
- Fiona Hall, artistic photographer and sculptor
- Rodney Hall, writer
- Rachel Harris, US actress and comedian
- Debbie Harry, US singer-songwriter
- Jennifer Hawkins, model
- Darren Hayes, singer-songwriter
- Sean Hayes, US actor
- Peter Helliar, comedian and radio presenter
- Chris Hemsworth, actor
- Liam Hemsworth, actor
- Luke Hemsworth, actor
- Dyson Heppell, Australian rules footballer
- Paul Hetherington, poet and academic
- Michelle Heyman, soccer player
- Erika Heynatz, model
- Missy Higgins, singer-songwriter
- Sarah Holland-Batt, poet and academic
- Lindy Hume, opera and festival director
- Nazeem Hussain, comedian and actor
- Natalie Imbruglia, singer-songwriter
- Del Irani, journalist
- Bindi Irwin, actress and television personality
- Jason Isbell, US country singer
- Eddie Izzard, UK comedian
- Hugh Jackman, actor
- Frank Jackson, analytic philosopher
- Ian Jacobs, Vice Chancellor of the University of New South Wales
- Samantha Jade, singer-songwriter
- Michael Jamison, Australian rules footballer
- Jim Jefferies, comedian
- Christian Jessen, UK doctor and television presenter
- Sir Elton John, UK singer and composer
- Andrew Johns, former professional rugby league footballer
- Nick Jonas, US singer-songwriter
- Jess Jonassen, cricketer
- Alan Jones, radio broadcaster
- Gail Jones, novelist and academic
- Jill Jones, poet and writer
- Nicholas Jose, novelist
- Alan Joyce, CEO of Qantas
- Mireille Juchau, author and editor
- Mojo Juju, singer-songwriter
- Kristina Keneally, former Premier of NSW and Sky News presenter
- Jeff Kennett, former Premier of Victoria
- Miranda Kerr, model
- John Key, former Prime Minister of New Zealand
- Paul Kidd, writer
- Nicole Kidman, actress
- Billie Jean King, former US World No. 1 professional tennis player
- John Kinsella, poet and novelist
- Michael Kirby, former High Court Judge
- Lady Gaga, US singer-songwriter
- Adam Lambert, US singer-songwriter
- Mary Lambert, US singer-songwriter
- Mitchell Langerak, professional football player
- Marcia Langton, holder of the Foundation Chair in Australian Indigenous Studies at the University of Melbourne
- Mitch Larkin, Olympic swimmer
- Cyndi Lauper, US singer-songwriter
- Benjamin Law, author and journalist
- Lucy Lawless, NZ actress
- Caspar Lee, UK-South African YouTube personality
- Nicole Livingstone, former competitive swimmer
- Lorde, NZ singer-songwriter
- Ksenija Lukich, model and television presenter
- Tony Lupton, Former Labor member of the VIC Legislative Assembly for Prahran
- Wendy Machin, former Nationals member of the NSW Legislative Assembly for Gloucester
- Macklemore, US rapper
- Lynn MacLaren, former Greens member of the Western Australian Legislative Council for the Southern Metropolitan Region
- Daniel MacPherson, actor and television presenter
- Tkay Maidza, singer-songwriter and rapper
- David Malouf, writer
- Jessica Marais, actress
- Miriam Margolyes, actress
- Benji Marshall, NZ rugby league footballer
- Chris Martin, UK singer-songwriter
- Ricky Martin, US singer
- David McAllister, Artistic Director of The Australian Ballet
- Patrick McCaughey, art historian and academic
- Eric McCormack, Canadian-American actor
- Chris McDiven, businesswoman and former Federal President of the Liberal Party
- Lynne McGranger, actress
- Eddie McGuire, radio and television presenter
- Brad McKay, doctor and television personality
- Sir Ian McKellen, UK actor
- Emma McKeon, competitive swimmer
- Gillon McLachlan, Chief Executive Officer of the Australian Football League
- Rhett McLaughlin, US internet comedian
- Rove McManus, comedian and television presenter
- Sally McManus, secretary of the Australian Council of Trade Unions
- Ian Meadows, actor and writer
- Debra Messing, US actress
- Alex Miller, novelist
- Jonathan Mills, composer and festival director
- Tim Minchin, musical comedian
- Dannii Minogue, singer-songwriter and actress
- Kylie Minogue, singer-songwriter and actress
- Matthew Mitcham, retired Olympic diver
- Luke Mitchell, actor and model
- Maia Mitchell, actress and singer
- Erin Molan, television presenter and sport commentator
- Sophie Monk, Bachelorette and singer-songwriter
- Maxine Morand, Former Labor member of the VIC Legislative Assembly for Mount Waverley
- Julia Morris, comedian and actress
- Tara Moss, writer
- Rhys Muldoon, actor and writer
- Megan Mullally, US actress
- Kate Mulvany, actress and writer
- David Mundy, Australian rules footballer
- Paul Murray, conservative radio broadcaster
- Denis Napthine, former Premier of Victoria
- Charles "Link" Neal, US internet comedian
- Ella Nelson, sprinter
- Liv Nervo, DJ
- Mim Nervo, DJ
- Garth Nix, writer
- Derek Nolan, former Irish Teachta Dála (MP)
- Barry O'Farrell, former Premier of New South Wales and Leader of the NSW Liberal Party
- Andrew Ogilvy, basketball player
- Jamie Oliver, UK celebrity chef
- John Oliver, UK comedian
- Jessica Origliasso, singer-songwriter and actress
- Lisa Origliasso, singer-songwriter and actress
- Jan Owen, poet
- Felicity Palmateer, professional surfer
- Pauline Pantsdown (Simon Hunt), academic and parodist
- Alexandra Park, actress
- Dolly Parton, US singer-songwriter, actress and businesswoman
- Bruce Pascoe, indigenous writer
- Matthew Pavlich, former professional Australian rules footballer
- Guy Pearce, actor and musician
- Bill Peden, former rugby league footballer
- Sarah Perkins, Australian rules footballer
- Erin Phillips, basketball player
- Liam Picken, Australian rules footballer
- Bronwyn Pike, Former Labor member of the VIC Legislative Assembly for Melbourne
- Pink, US actress
- Felicity Plunkett, poet and critic
- David Pocock, rugby union player
- Anthony Pratt, businessman and billionaire
- Lauren Reynolds, cyclist
- John Rickard, academic, economist and author
- Rebecca Rigg, actress
- Kelly Ripa, US actress and media personality
- Margot Robbie, actress
- Ian Roberts, former professional rugby league footballer
- Mikey Robins, media personality and comedian
- Elizabeth Rose, singer-songwriter
- Peter Rose, poet, novelist and editor
- Ruby Rose, model and actress
- RuPaul, US actor and drag queen
- Beau Ryan, former professional rugby league footballer
- Brian Schmidt, winner of the 2011 Nobel Prize in Physics and vice chancellor of the Australian National University
- Leo Schofield, restaurant critic and journalist
- Julianne Schultz, academic, author and editor
- Megan Schutt, cricketer
- Kim Scott, novelist
- Peta Seaton, former Liberal member of the NSW Legislative Assembly for Southern Highlands
- Guy Sebastian, singer-songwriter
- Frank Sedgman, retired former World No. 1 tennis champion
- Emily Seebohm, Olympic swimmer
- Shanina Shaik, model
- Samantha Shannon, UK writer
- Jim Sharman, film director and writer
- Jake Shears, US singer-songwriter
- Brett Sheehy, artistic director, producer and curator
- Joan Sheldon, former Treasurer of Queensland and former Deputy Premier of Queensland
- Tony Shepherd, businessman
- Greg Sheridan, journalist and commentator for The Australian
- Hugh Sheridan, actor and musician
- Michael Shmith, journalist and writer
- Luke Shuey, Australian rules footballer
- Sia, singer-songwriter
- Peter Singer, moral philosopher
- Troye Sivan, singer-songwriter and YouTube personality
- Laura Smet, French actress
- Sam Smith, UK singer-songwriter
- Sam Sparro, singer-songwriter and music producer
- Caitlin Stasey, actress
- Yvonne Strahovski, actress
- Joe Sugg, UK YouTube personality
- James Sutherland, former first-class cricketer and current CEO of Cricket Australia
- Hilary Swank, US actress
- Tom Switzer, conservative columnist
- Magda Szubanski, actress and comedian
- Miranda Tapsell, actress
- Molly Tarlov, US actress
- Peter Tatchell, UK human rights campaigner
- Rachael Taylor, actress and model
- Tom Taylor, writer
- Josh Thomas, comedian
- Ian Thorpe, Olympic swimmer
- Holly Throsby, songwriter and musician
- Carrie Tiffany, novelist
- Phoebe Tonkin, actress and model
- Meghan Trainor, US singer-songwriter
- Nicole Trunfio, model
- Christos Tsiolkas, author
- Lucy Turnbull, businesswoman, wife of Prime Minister Malcolm Turnbull and former Lord Mayor of Sydney
- Peter van Onselen, Sky News host and political commentator
- Zoe Ventoura, actress
- Darcy Vescio, Australian rules footballer
- Esma Voloder, model and winner of Miss World Australia 2017
- Gemma Ward, fashion model and actress
- Shane Warne, former international cricketer
- Megan Washington, musician and songwriter
- Shane Watson, professional cricketer
- Jacki Weaver, actress
- Hugo Weaving, actor
- Samara Weaving, actress
- Karrie Webb, professional golfer
- Jennifer Westacott, chief executive of the Business Council of Australia (BCA)
- Alex Wilkinson, football player
- Lisa Wilkinson, journalist
- Kim Williams, media executive and composer
- Kip Williams, theatre director
- Robyn Williams, science journalist and broadcaster
- Alex Williamson, comedian
- Wippa, media personality
- Keith Wolahan, future Liberal MP for Menzies
- Conchita Wurst, Austrian singer and drag queen
- Michael Yabsley, former Liberal member of the NSW Legislative Assembly for Vaucluse
- John Paul Young, singer
- Maddie Ziegler, US dancer
- Julia Zemiro, television presenter

=== Notable bands ===
- Client Liaison, indie rock band
- Flight Facilities, electronic producer duo
- Frenzal Rhomb, rock band
- Killing Heidi, rock band
- London Grammar, UK indie pop band
- Peking Duk, electronic music duo
- Placebo, UK alternative rock band
- Sigur Rós, Icelandic post-rock band
- Take That, UK pop group
- Tegan and Sara, Canadian indie pop band
- The Aston Shuffle, house music duo
- The Jezabels, indie rock band
- The Preatures, rock band

=== Politicians ===
==== Federal Politicians ====
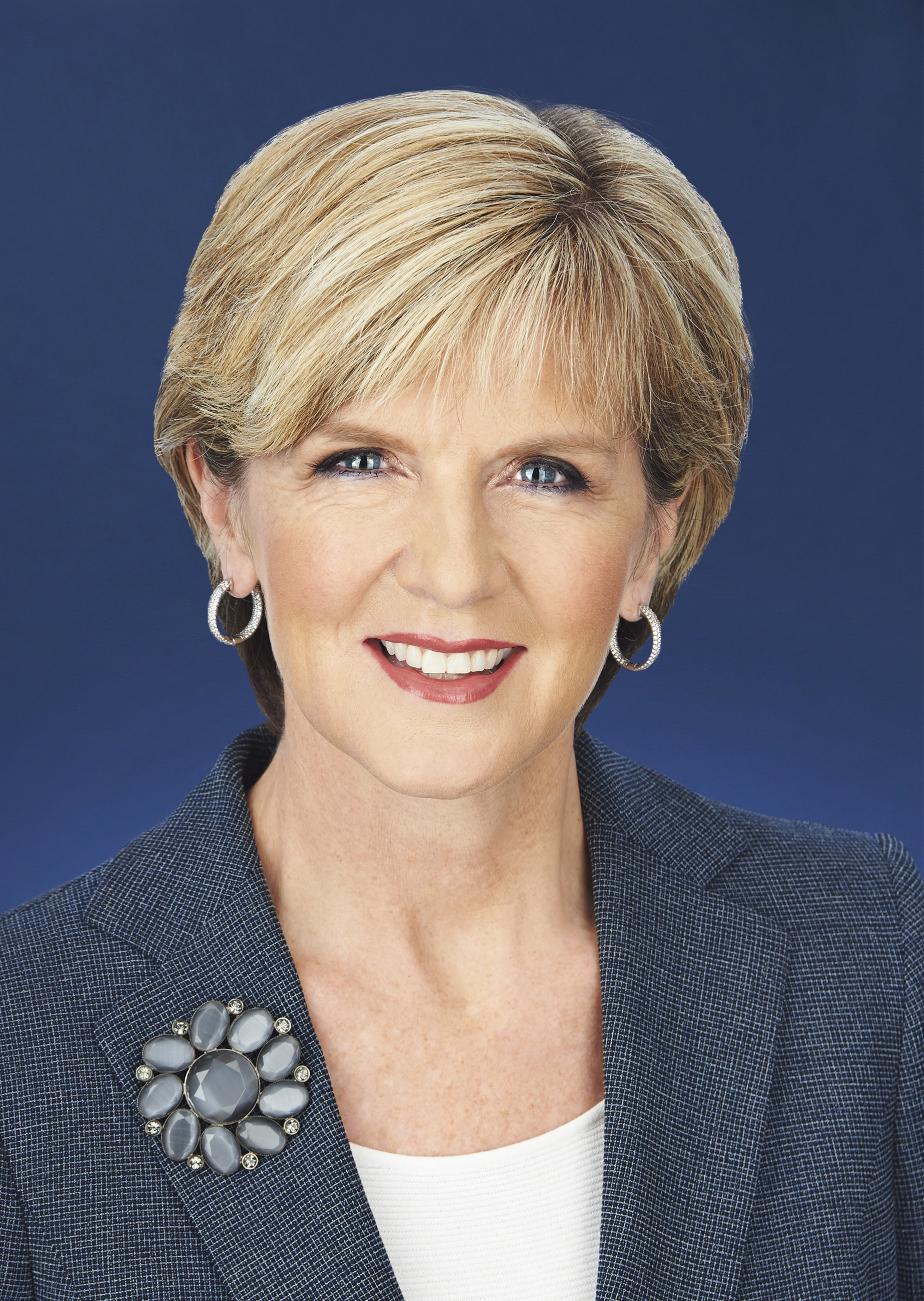
MP Julie Bishop

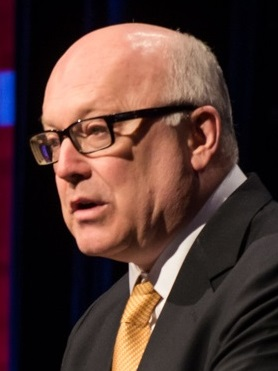
Attorney-General George Brandis

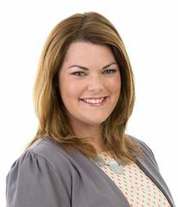
Senator Sarah Hanson-Young

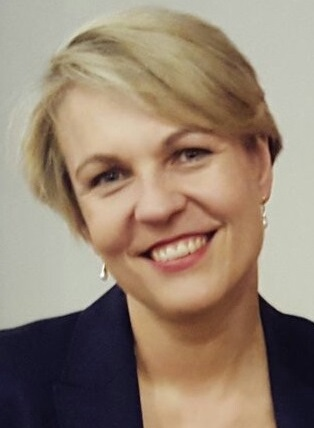
MP Tanya Plibersek

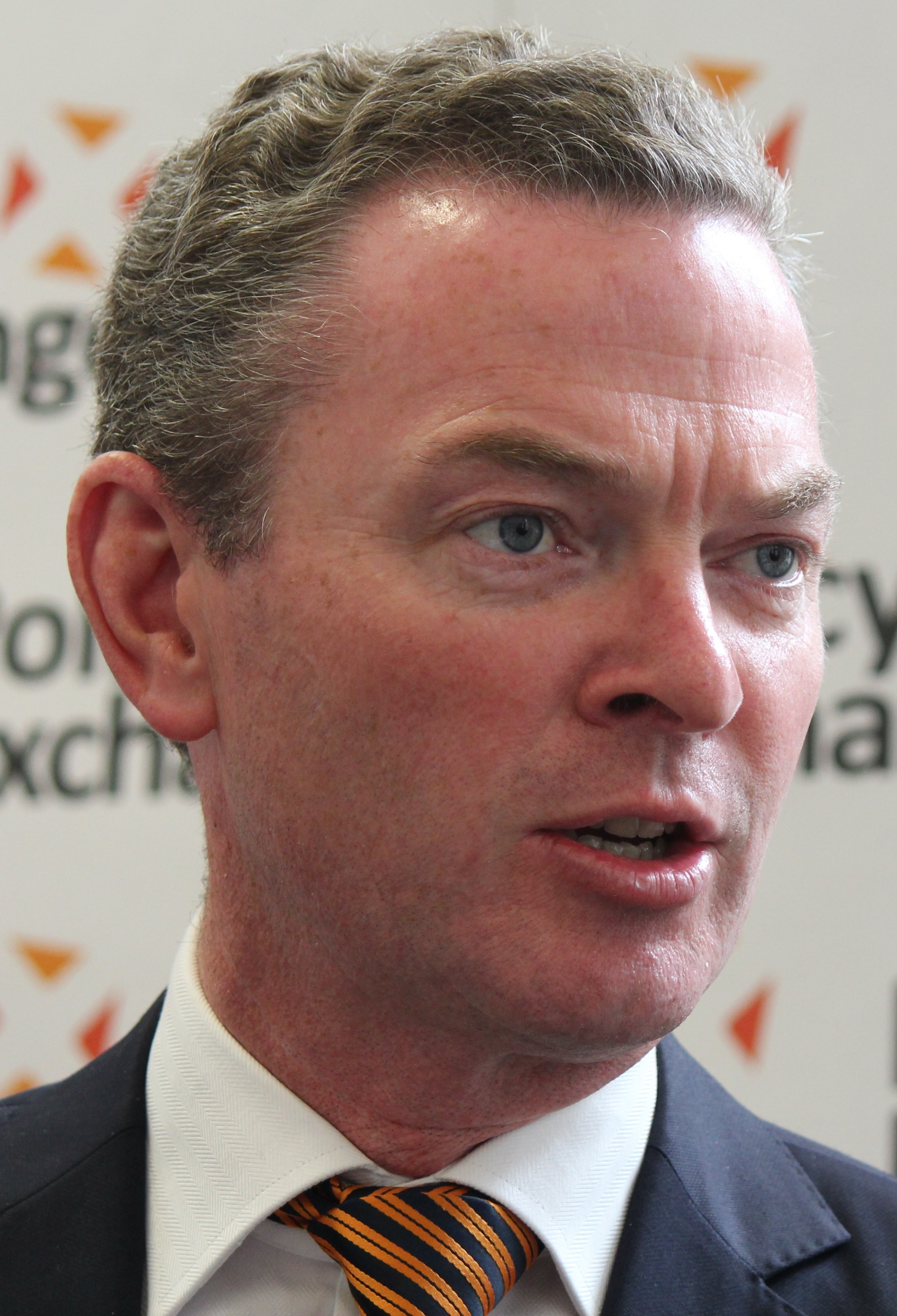
MP Christopher Pyne

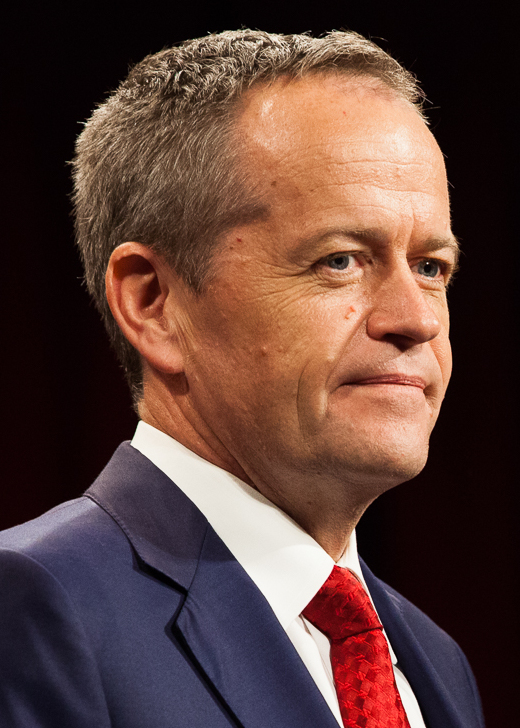
Opposition Leader Bill Shorten

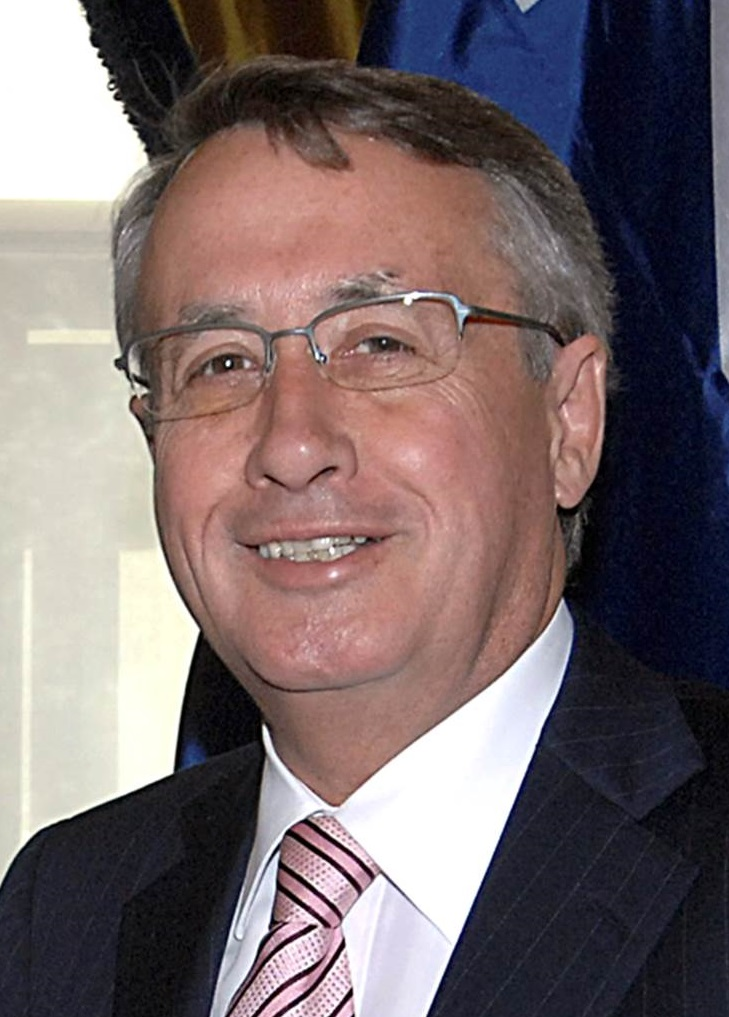
MP Wayne Swan

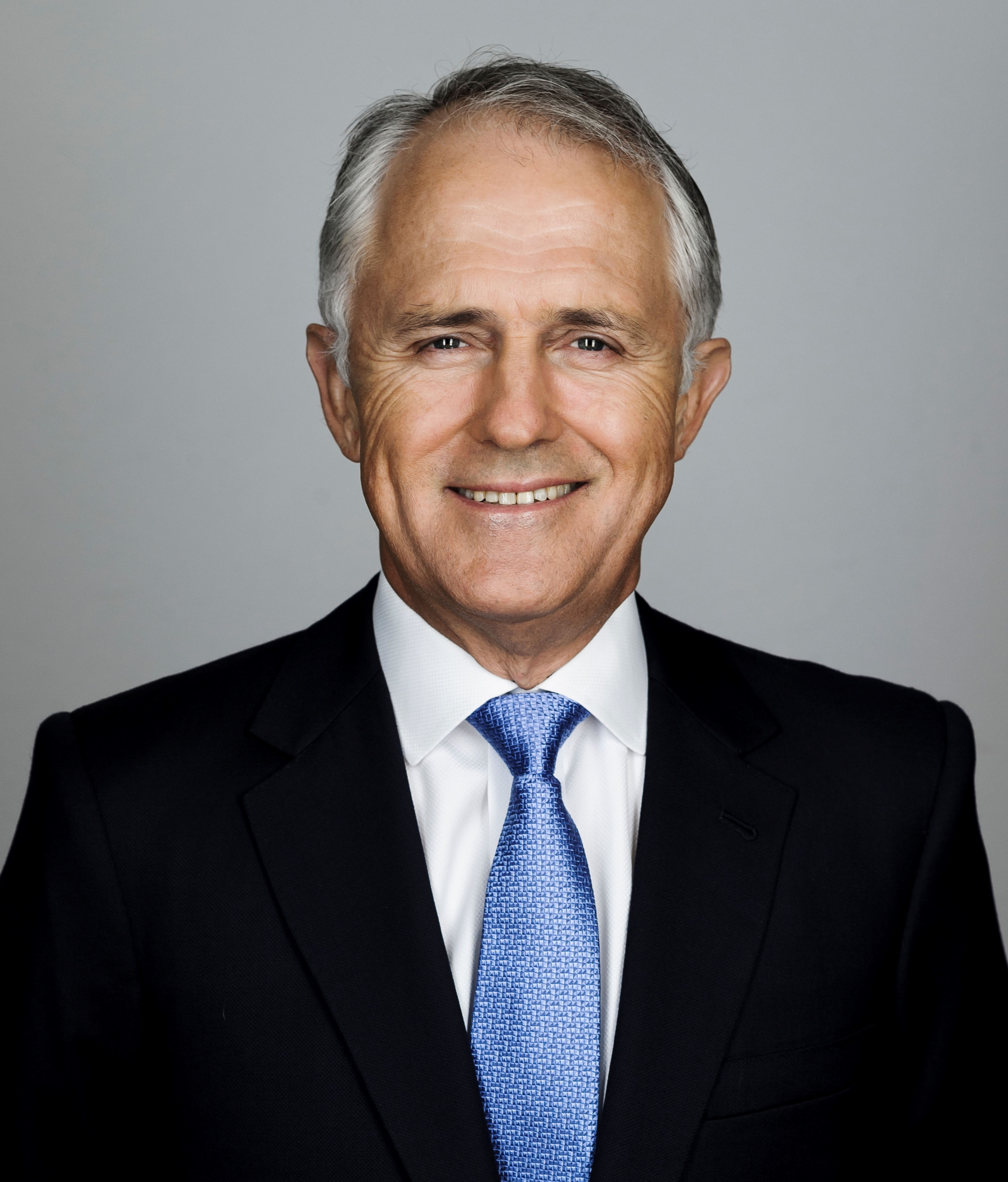
Prime Minister Malcolm Turnbull

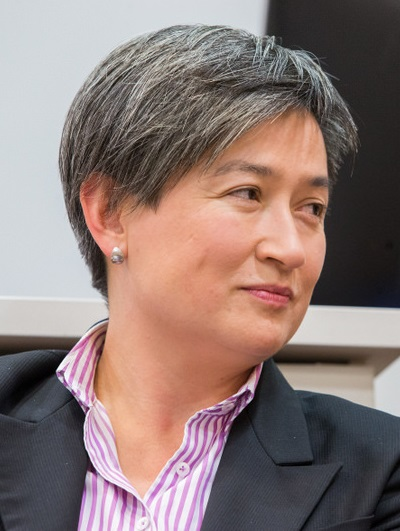
Senator Penny Wong

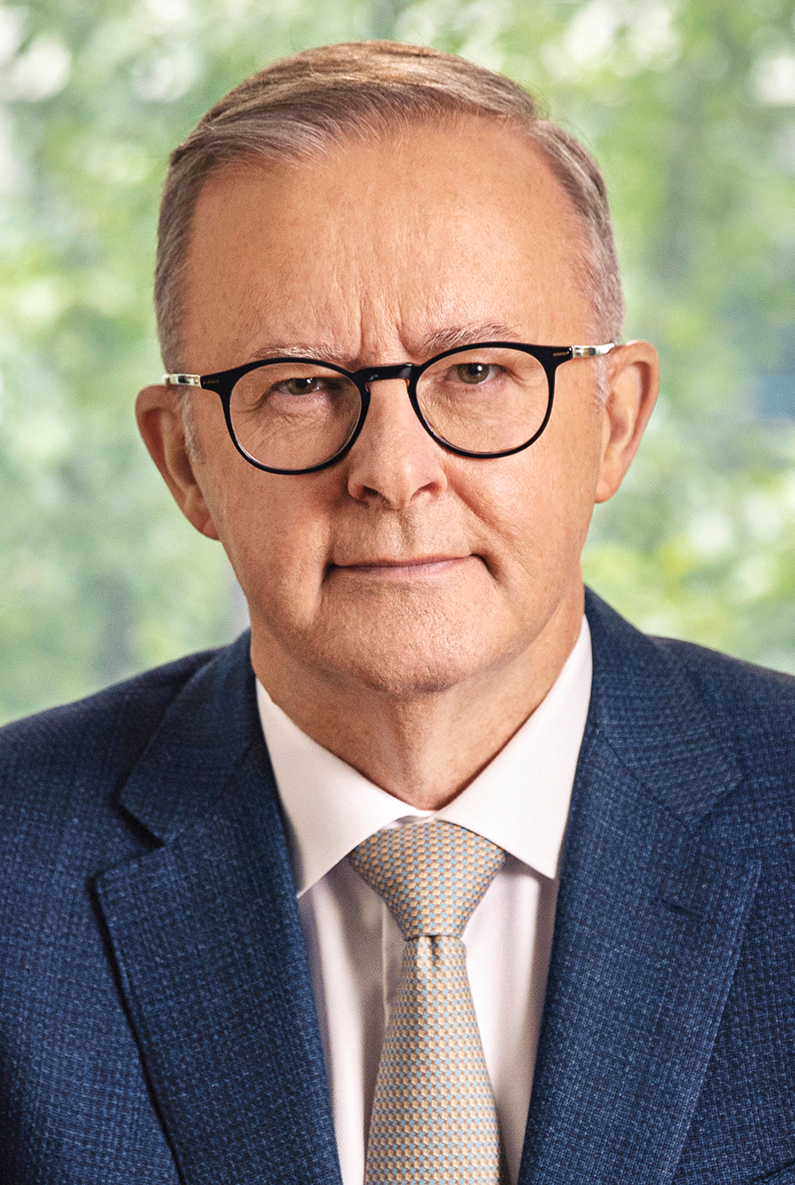
Future Prime Minister Anthony Albanese

- Anthony Albanese, Labor MP for Grayndler and former Deputy Prime Minister (2013)
- John Alexander, Liberal MP for Bennelong
- Anne Aly, Labor MP for Cowan
- Adam Bandt, Australian Greens MP for Melbourne
- Julia Banks, Liberal MP for Chisholm
- Andrew Bartlett, Australian Greens Senator for Queensland and former Australian Democrats Senator for Queensland (1997-2008)
- Catryna Bilyk, Labor Senator for Tasmania
- Sharon Bird, Labor MP for Cunningham
- Simon Birmingham, Liberal Senator for South Australia
- Julie Bishop, Liberal MP for Curtin
- Chris Bowen, Labor MP for McMahon and former MP for Prospect (2004-2010)
- George Brandis, Liberal Senator for Queensland
- Gai Brodtmann, Labor MP for Canberra
- Carol Brown, Labor Senator for Tasmania
- Tony Burke, Labor MP for Watson
- Linda Burney, Labor MP for Barton
- Mark Butler, Labor MP for Port Adelaide
- Terri Butler, Labor MP for Griffith
- Doug Cameron, Labor Senator for New South Wales
- Kim Carr, Labor Senator for Victoria
- Jim Chalmers, Labor MP for Rankin
- Nick Champion, Labor MP for Wakefield
- Darren Chester, National MP for Gippsland
- Lisa Chesters, Labor MP for Bendigo
- Anthony Chisholm, Labor Senator for Queensland
- Jason Clare, Labor MP for Blaxland
- Sharon Claydon, Labor MP for Newcastle
- David Coleman, Liberal MP for Banks
- Julie Collins, Labor MP for Franklin
- Pat Conroy, Labor MP for Shortland and former MP for Charlton (2013-2016)
- Chris Crewther, Liberal MP for Dunkley
- Michael Danby, Labor MP for Melbourne Ports
- Sam Dastyari, Labor Senator for New South Wales
- Richard Di Natale, Australian Greens Senator for Victoria
- Milton Dick, Labor MP for Oxley
- Pat Dodson, Labor Senator for Western Australia
- Mark Dreyfus, Labor MP for Isaacs
- Damian Drum, National MP for Murray
- Justine Elliot, Labor MP for Richmond
- Kate Ellis, Labor MP for Adelaide
- Warren Entsch, Liberal MP for Leichhardt
- Trevor Evans, Liberal MP for Brisbane
- Jason Falinski, Liberal MP for Mackellar
- David Feeney, Labor MP for Batman and former Senator for Victoria (2008-2013)
- Mitch Fifield, Liberal Senator for Victoria
- Joel Fitzgibbon, Labor MP for Hunter
- Paul Fletcher, Liberal MP for Bradfield
- Mike Freelander, Labor MP for Macarthur
- Josh Frydenberg, Liberal MP for Kooyong
- Katy Gallagher, Labor Senator for the Australian Capital Territory, former Chief Minister of the Australian Capital Territory (2011-2014), and former Deputy Chief Minister of the Australian Capital Territory (2006-2011)
- Steve Georganas, Labor MP for Hindmarsh and former MP for Hindmarsh (2004-2013)
- Andrew Giles, Labor MP for Scullin
- Stirling Griff, Nick Xenophon Team Senator for South Australia
- Luke Gosling, Labor MP for Solomon
- Tim Hammond, Labor MP for Perth
- Sarah Hanson-Young, Australian Greens Senator for South Australia
- Ross Hart, Labor MP for Bass
- Sarah Henderson, Liberal MP for Corangamite
- Julian Hill, Labor MP for Bruce
- Derryn Hinch, Justice Party Senator for Victoria
- Kevin Hogan, National MP for Page
- Jane Hume, Liberal Senator for Victoria
- Greg Hunt, Liberal MP for Flinders
- Emma Husar, Labor MP for Lindsay
- Ed Husic, Labor MP for Chifley
- Stephen Jones, Labor MP for Whitlam and former MP for Throsby (2010-2016)
- Skye Kakoschke-Moore, Nick Xenophon Team Senator for South Australia
- Justine Keay, Labor MP for Braddon
- Michael Keenan, Liberal MP for Stirling
- Mike Kelly, Labor MP for Eden-Monaro and former MP for Eden-Monaro (2007-2013)
- Matt Keogh, Labor MP for Burt
- Peter Khalil, Labor MP for Wills
- Catherine King, Labor MP for Ballarat
- Madeleine King, Labor MP for Brand
- Kimberley Kitching, Labor Senator for Victoria
- Susan Lamb, Labor MP for Longman
- Andrew Leigh, Labor MP for Fenner and former MP for Fraser (2010-2016)
- Sussan Ley, Liberal MP for Farrer
- David Leyonhjelm, Liberal Democratic Party Senator for New South Wales
- Sue Lines, Labor Senator for Western Australia
- Jenny Macklin, Labor MP for Jagajaga
- Richard Marles, Labor MP for Corio
- Gavin Marshall, Labor Senator for Victoria
- Jenny McAllister, Labor Senator for New South Wales
- Emma McBride, Labor MP for Dobell
- Malarndirri McCarthy, Labor Senator for the Northern Territory
- Cathy McGowan, Independent MP for Indi
- Nick McKim, Australian Greens Senator for Tasmania
- Brian Mitchell, Labor MP for Lyons
- Rob Mitchell, Labor MP for McEwen
- Claire Moore, Labor Senator for Queensland
- Shayne Neumann, Labor MP for Blair
- Brendan O'Connor, Labor MP for Gorton and former MP for Burke (2001-2004)
- Kelly O'Dwyer, Liberal MP for Higgins
- Clare O'Neil, Labor MP for Hotham
- Cathy O'Toole, Labor MP for Herbert
- Julie Owens, Labor MP for Parramatta
- James Paterson, Liberal Senator for Victoria
- Rex Patrick, Nick Xenophon Team Senator for South Australia
- Marise Payne, Liberal Senator for New South Wales
- Graham Perrett, Labor MP for Moreton
- Tanya Plibersek, Labor MP for Sydney
- Christian Porter, Liberal MP for Pearce
- Louise Pratt, Labor Senator for Western Australia
- Melissa Price, Liberal MP for Durack
- Christopher Pyne, Liberal MP for Sturt
- Linda Reynolds, Liberal Senator for Western Australia
- Lee Rhiannon, Australian Greens Senator for New South Wales
- Janet Rice, Australian Greens Senator for Victoria
- Amanda Rishworth, Labor MP for Kingston
- Michelle Rowland, Labor MP for Greenway
- Joanne Ryan, Labor MP for Lalor
- Scott Ryan, Liberal Senator for Victoria
- Nigel Scullion, National Senator for the Northern Territory
- Rebekha Sharkie, Nick Xenophon Team MP for Mayo
- Bill Shorten, Opposition Leader and Labor MP for Maribyrnong
- Rachel Siewert, Australian Greens Senator for Western Australia
- Lisa Singh, Labor Senator for Tasmania
- Arthur Sinodinos, Liberal Senator for New South Wales
- Dean Smith, Liberal Senator for Western Australia
- Warren Snowdon, Labor MP for Lingiari and former MP for Northern Territory (1987-1996, 1998-2001)
- Anne Stanley, Labor MP for Werriwa
- Glenn Sterle, Labor Senator for Western Australia
- Wayne Swan, Labor MP for Lilley and former Deputy Prime Minister (2010-2013)
- Meryl Swanson, Labor MP for Paterson
- Susan Templeman, Labor MP for Macquarie
- Matt Thistlethwaite, Labor MP for Kingsford Smith and former Senator for New South Wales (2011-2013)
- Malcolm Turnbull, Prime Minister, Liberal MP for Wentworth, and former Opposition Leader (2008-2009)
- Anne Urquhart, Labor Senator for Tasmania
- Andrew Wallace, Liberal MP for Fisher
- Murray Watt, Labor Senator for Queensland
- Tim Watts, Labor MP for Gellibrand
- Peter Whish-Wilson, Australian Greens Senator for Tasmania
- Andrew Wilkie, Independent MP for Denison
- Josh Wilson, Labor MP for Fremantle
- Tim Wilson, Liberal MP for Goldstein
- Penny Wong, Labor Senator for South Australia
- Jason Wood, Liberal MP for La Trobe
- Trent Zimmerman, Liberal MP for North Sydney

Former Federal Politicians

- Mark Arbib, former Labor Senator for New South Wales (2008-2012)
- Bruce Baird, former Liberal MP for Cook (1998-2007)
- Peter Baume, former Liberal Senator for New South Wales (1974-1991)
- Kim Beazley, former Deputy Prime Minister (1995-1996), former Opposition Leader (1996-2001, 2005-2006), and Labor MP for Swan (1980-1996) and Brand (1996-2007)
- Neal Blewett, former Labor MP for Bonython (1977-1994)
- Sue Boyce, former Liberal Senator for Queensland (2007-2014)
- Jamie Briggs, former Liberal MP for Mayo (2008-2016)
- Mal Brough, former Liberal MP for Longman (1996-2007) and Fisher (2013-2016)
- Bob Brown, former Australian Greens Senator for Tasmania (1996-2012)
- Anna Burke, former Labor MP for Chisholm (1998-2016)
- Ian Campbell, former Liberal Senator for Western Australia (1990-2007)
- Bob Carr, former Labor Senator for New South Wales (2012-2013), former Premier of New South Wales (1995-2005), and former NSW Opposition Leader (1988-1995)
- Fred Chaney, former Liberal Senator for Western Australia (1974-1990) and Liberal MP for Pearce (1990-1993)
- Darren Cheeseman, former Labor MP for Corangamite (2007-2013)
- Greg Combet, former Labor MP for Charlton (2007-2013)
- Helen Coonan, former Liberal Senator for New South Wales (1996-2011)
- Simon Crean, former Opposition Leader (2001-2003) and Labor MP for Hotham (1990-2013)
- Trish Crossin, former Labor Senator for the Northern Territory (1998-2013)
- Yvette D'Ath, former Labor MP for Petrie (2007-2013)
- Chris Evans, former Labor Senator for Western Australia (1993-2013)
- Gareth Evans, former Labor Senator for Victoria (1978-1996) and Labor MP for Holt (1996-1999)
- John Faulkner, former Labor Senator for New South Wales (1989-2015)
- Laurie Ferguson, former Labor MP for Reid (1990-2010) and Werriwa (2010-2016)
- Teresa Gambaro, former Liberal MP for Petrie (1996-2007) and Brisbane (2010-2016)
- Peter Garrett, former Labor MP for Kingsford Smith (2004-2013)
- Petro Georgiou, former Liberal MP for Kooyong (1994-2010)
- Steve Gibbons, former Labor MP for Bendigo (1998-2013)
- Julia Gillard, former Prime Minister (2010-2013), former Deputy Prime Minister (2007-2010), and Labor MP for Lalor (1998-2013)
- Gary Gray, former Labor MP for Brand (2007-2016)
- Brian Greig, former Australian Democrats Senator for Western Australia (1999-2005)
- Sharon Grierson, former Labor MP for Newcastle (2001-2013)
- Alan Griffin, former Labor MP for Corinella (1993-1996) and Bruce (1996-2016)
- Natasha Griggs, former Liberal MP for Solomon (2010-2016)
- Damian Hale, former Labor MP for Solomon (2007-2010)
- Jill Hall, former Labor MP for Shortland (1998-2016)
- Bob Hawke, former Prime Minister (1983-1991), Opposition Leader (1983), and Labor MP for Wills (1980-1992)
- Bill Hayden, former Opposition Leader (1977-1983) and Labor MP for Oxley (1961-1988)
- John Hewson, former Opposition Leader (1990-1994) and Liberal MP for Wentworth (1987-1995)
- Robert Hill, former Liberal Senator for South Australia (1981-2006)
- Colin Hollis, former Labor MP for Macarthur (1983-1984) and Throsby (1984-2001)
- Gary Humphries, former Liberal Senator for the Australian Capital Territory (2003-2013), former Chief Minister of the Australian Capital Territory (2000-2001), former Deputy Chief Minister of the Australian Capital Territory (1997-2000), and former ACT Opposition Leader (2001-2002)
- Harry Jenkins, former Labor MP for Scullin (1985-2013)
- Ewen Jones, former Liberal MP for Herbert (2010-2016)
- Helen Kroger, former Liberal Senator for Victoria (2008-2014)
- Glenn Lazarus, former Palmer United Party-turned-Independent Senator for Queensland (2014-2016)
- Kirsten Livermore, former Labor MP for Capricornia (1998-2013)
- Scott Ludlam, former Australian Greens Senator for Western Australia (2008-2017)
- Joe Ludwig, former Labor Senator for Queensland (1999-2016)
- Kate Lundy, former Labor Senator for the Australian Capital Territory (1996-2015)
- Alannah MacTiernan, former Labor MP for Perth (2013-2016)
- Anne McEwen, former Labor Senator for South Australia (2005-2016)
- Jan McLucas, former Labor Senator for Queensland (1999-2016)
- Bob McMullan, former Labor Senator for the Australian Capital Territory (1988-1996) and Labor MP for Canberra (1996-1998) and Fraser (1998-2010)
- Christine Milne, former Australian Greens Senator for Tasmania (2005-2015)
- Judi Moylan, former Liberal MP for Pearce (1993-2013)
- Ricky Muir, former Australian Motoring Enthusiast Party Senator for Victoria (2014-2016)
- Brendan Nelson, former Opposition Leader (2007-2008) and Liberal MP for Bradfield (1996-2008)
- Kerry Nettle, former Australian Greens Senator for New South Wales (2002-2008)
- Michelle O'Byrne, former Labor MP for Bass (1998-2004)
- Rob Oakeshott, former Independent MP for Lyne (2008-2013)
- Michael Organ, former Australian Greens MP for Cunningham (2002-2004)
- Melissa Parke, former Labor MP for Fremantle (2007-2016)
- Andrew Peacock, former Opposition Leader (1983-1985, 1989-1990) and Liberal MP for Kooyong (1966-1994)
- Nova Peris, former Labor Senator for the Northern Territory (2013-2016)
- Chris Puplick, former Liberal Senator for New South Wales (1978-1981, 1984-1990)
- Bernie Ripoll, former Labor MP for Oxley (1998-2016)
- Nicola Roxon, former Labor MP for Gellibrand (1998-2013)
- Wyatt Roy, former Liberal MP for Longman (2010-2016)
- Kevin Rudd, former Prime Minister (2007-2010, 2013), Opposition Leader (2006-2007), and Labor MP for Griffith (1998-2013)
- Janelle Saffin, former Labor MP for Page (2007-2013)
- Fiona Scott, former Liberal MP for Lindsay (2013-2016)
- Sid Sidebottom, former Labor MP for Braddon (1998-2004, 2007-2013)
- Robert Simms, former Australian Greens Senator for South Australia (2015-2016)
- Stephen Smith, former Labor MP for Perth (1993-2013)
- Warwick Smith, former Liberal MP for Bass (1984-1993, 1996-1998)
- Laura Smyth, former Labor MP for La Trobe (2010-2013)
- Natasha Stott Despoja, former Australian Democrats Senator for South Australia (1995-2008)
- Lindsay Tanner, former Labor MP for Melbourne (1993-2010)
- Craig Thomson, former Labor-turned-Independent MP for Dobell (2007-2013)
- Kelvin Thomson, former Labor MP for Wills (1996-2016)
- Lin Thorp, former Labor Senator for Tasmania (2012-2014)
- Chris Trevor, former Labor MP for Flynn (2007-2010)
- Judith Troeth, former Liberal Senator for Victoria (1993-2011)
- Amanda Vanstone, former Liberal Senator for South Australia (1984-2007)
- Dio Wang, former Palmer United Party Senator for Western Australia (2014-2016)
- Mal Washer, former Liberal MP for Moore (1998-2013)
- Larissa Waters, former Australian Greens Senator for Queensland (2011-2017)
- Tony Windsor, former Independent MP for New England (2001-2013)
- Michael Wooldridge, former Liberal MP for Chisholm (1987-1998) and Casey (1998-2001)
- Penny Wright, former Australian Greens Senator for South Australia (2011-2015)
- Nick Xenophon, former Independent-turned-Nick Xenophon Team Senator for South Australia (2008-2017)

State and Territory Politicians

- Ngaree Ah Kit, Labor member of the NT Legislative Assembly for Karama
- Jenny Aitchison, Labor member of the NSW Legislative Assembly for Maitland
- Martin Aldridge, National member of the WA Legislative Council for Agricultural
- Jacinta Allan, Labor member of the Victorian Legislative Assembly for Bendigo East
- Daniel Andrews, Premier of Victoria, Labor member of the Victorian Legislative Assembly for Mulgrave, and former Victorian Opposition Leader (2010-2014)
- Stuart Ayres, Liberal member of the NSW Legislative Assembly for Penrith
- Scott Bacon, Labor member of the Tasmanian House of Assembly for Denison
- Mark Bailey, Labor member of the Queensland Legislative Assembly for Yeerongpilly
- Lisa Baker, Labor member of the WA Legislative Assembly for Maylands
- Andrew Barr, Chief Minister of the Australian Capital Territory and Labor member of the ACT Legislative Assembly for Kurrajong
- Clayton Barr, Labor member of the NSW Legislative Assembly for Cessnock
- Brad Battin, Liberal member of the Victorian Legislative Assembly for Gembrook
- Gladys Berejiklian, Premier of New South Wales and Liberal member of the NSW Legislative Assembly for Willoughby
- Yvette Berry, Deputy Chief Minister of the Australian Capital Territory and Labor member of the ACT Legislative Assembly for Ginninderra
- Jarrod Bleijie, Liberal National member of the Queensland Legislative Assembly for Kawana
- Nikki Boyd, Labor member of the Queensland Legislative Assembly for Pine Rivers
- Jacqui Boydell, National member of the WA Legislative Council for Mining and Pastoral
- Roma Britnell, Liberal member of the Victorian Legislative Assembly for South-West Coast
- Shane Broad, Labor member of the Tasmanian House of Assembly for Braddon
- Adam Brooks, Liberal member of the Tasmanian House of Assembly for Braddon
- Don Brown, Labor member of the Queensland Legislative Assembly for Capalaba
- Jeremy Buckingham, Australian Greens member of the NSW Legislative Council
- Joy Burch, Labor member of the ACT Legislative Assembly for Brindabella
- Glenn Butcher, Labor member of the Queensland Legislative Assembly for Gladstone
- Prue Car, Labor member of the NSW Legislative Assembly for Londonderry
- John Carey, Labor member of the WA Legislative Assembly for Perth
- Ben Carroll, Labor member of the Victorian Legislative Assembly for Niddrie
- Yasmin Catley, Labor member of the NSW Legislative Assembly for Swansea
- Tara Cheyne, Labor member of the ACT Legislative Assembly for Ginninderra
- Alanna Clohesy, Labor member of the WA Legislative Council for East Metropolitan
- Susan Close, Labor member of the SA House of Assembly for Port Adelaide
- Bec Cody, Labor member of the ACT Legislative Assembly for Murrumbidgee
- Nat Cook, Labor member of the SA House of Assembly for Fisher
- Roger Cook, Deputy Premier of Western Australia and Labor member of the WA Legislative Assembly for Kwinana
- Sarah Courtney, Liberal member of the Tasmanian House of Assembly for Bass
- Tim Crakanthorp, Labor member of the NSW Legislative Assembly for Newcastle
- Craig Crawford, Labor member of the Queensland Legislative Assembly for Barron River
- Catherine Cusack, Liberal member of the NSW Legislative Council
- Yvette D'Ath, Labor member of the Queensland Legislative Assembly for Redcliffe
- Philip Dalidakis, Labor member of the Victorian Legislative Council for the Southern Metropolitan
- John Darley, Independent-turned-Nick Xenophon Team-turned-Advance SA member of the SA Legislative Council
- Mia Davies, National member of the WA Legislative Assembly for Central Wheatbelt
- David Davis, Liberal member of the Victorian Legislative Council for the Southern Metropolitan
- Andrew Dawkins, Australian Greens member of the Tasmanian House of Assembly for Bass
- Stephen Dawson, Labor member of the WA Legislative Council for Mining and Pastoral
- Cameron Dick, Labor member of the Queensland Legislative Assembly for Woodridge
- Steve Dimopoulos, Labor member of the Victorian Legislative Assembly for Oakleigh
- Victor Dominello, Liberal member of the NSW Legislative Assembly for Ryde
- Kate Doust, Labor member of the WA Legislative Council for South Metropolitan
- Trish Doyle, Labor member of the NSW Legislative Assembly for Blue Mountains
- Paul Edbrooke, Labor member of the Victorian Legislative Assembly for Frankston
- Maree Edwards, Labor member of the Victorian Legislative Assembly for Bendigo West
- Scott Emerson, Liberal National member of the Queensland Legislative Assembly for Indooroopilly
- Leeanne Enoch, Labor member of the Queensland Legislative Assembly for Algester
- Lee Evans, Liberal member of the NSW Legislative Assembly for Heathcote
- Di Farmer, Labor member of the Queensland Legislative Assembly for Bulimba
- Craig Farrell, Labor member of the Tasmanian Legislative Council for Derwent
- Mehreen Faruqi, Australian Greens member of the NSW Legislative Council
- Shannon Fentiman, Labor member of the Queensland Legislative Assembly for Electoral district of Waterford
- Kerry Finch, Independent member of the Tasmanian Legislative Council for Rosevears
- Meegan Fitzharris, Labor member of the ACT Legislative Assembly for Yerrabi
- Luke Foley, NSW Opposition Leader and Labor member of the NSW Legislative Assembly for Auburn
- Martin Foley, Labor member of the Victorian Legislative Assembly for Albert Park
- Ruth Forrest, Independent member of the Tasmanian Legislative Council for Murchison
- Tammy Franks, Australian Greens member of the SA Legislative Council
- Natasha Fyles, Labor member of the NT Legislative Assembly for Nightcliff
- Mike Gaffney, Independent member of the Tasmanian Legislative Council for Mersey
- Gail Gago, Labor member of the SA Legislative Council
- John Gazzola, Labor member of the SA Legislative Council
- Mick Gentleman, Labor member of the ACT Legislative Assembly for Brindabella
- Mark Gepp, Labor member of the Victorian Legislative Council for the Northern Victoria
- Lara Giddings, Labor member of the Tasmanian House of Assembly for Franklin, former Premier of Tasmania (2011-2014) and former Deputy Premier of Tasmania (2008-2011)
- Julieanne Gilbert, Labor member of the Queensland Legislative Assembly for Mackay
- Grace Grace, Labor member of the Queensland Legislative Assembly for Brisbane Central
- Alex Greenwich, Independent member of the NSW Legislative Assembly for Sydney
- Matthew Groom, Liberal member of the Tasmanian House of Assembly for Denison
- Michael Gunner, Chief Minister of the Northern Territory, Labor member of the NT Legislative Assembly for Fannie Bay, and former NT Opposition Leader (2015-2016)
- Peter Gutwein, Liberal member of the Tasmanian House of Assembly for Bass
- Matthew Guy, Victorian Opposition Leader and Liberal member of the Victorian Legislative Assembly for Bulleen
- Shelley Hancock, Liberal member of the NSW Legislative Assembly for South Coast
- Jeremy Hanson, Liberal member of the ACT Legislative Assembly for Murrumbidgee and former ACT Opposition Leader (2013-2016)
- Aaron Harper, Labor member of the Queensland Legislative Assembly for Thuringowa
- David Harris, Labor member of the NSW Legislative Assembly for Wyong
- Jodie Harrison, Labor member of the NSW Legislative Assembly for Charlestown
- Colleen Hartland, Australian Greens member of the Victorian Legislative Council for Western Metropolitan
- Liza Harvey, Liberal member of the WA Legislative Assembly for Scarborough and former Deputy Premier of Western Australia (2016-2017)
- Don Harwin, Liberal member of the NSW Legislative Council
- Jo Haylen, Labor member of the NSW Legislative Assembly for Summer Hill
- Jill Hennessy, Labor member of the Victorian Legislative Assembly for Altona
- Sam Hibbins, Australian Greens member of the Victorian Legislative Assembly for Prahran
- Gary Higgins, NT Opposition Leader and Country Liberal Party member of the NT Legislative Assembly for Daly
- Katrine Hildyard, Labor member of the SA House of Assembly for Reynell
- Stirling Hinchliffe, Labor member of the Queensland Legislative Assembly for Sandgate
- Will Hodgman, Premier of Tasmania, Liberal member of the Tasmanian House of Assembly for Franklin, and former Tasmanian Opposition Leader (2006-2014)
- Sonia Hornery, Labor member of the NSW Legislative Assembly for Wallsend
- Jennifer Howard, Labor member of the Queensland Legislative Assembly
- Ian Hunter, Labor member of the SA Legislative Council
- Natalie Hutchins, Labor member of the Victorian Legislative Assembly for Sydenham
- Roger Jaensch, Liberal member of the Tasmanian House of Assembly for Braddon
- Kate Jones, Labor member of the Queensland Legislative Assembly for Ashgrove
- Matt Kean, Liberal member of the NSW Legislative Assembly for Hornsby
- Joe Kelly, Labor member of the Queensland Legislative Assembly for Greenslopes
- Trevor Khan, National member of the NSW Legislative Council
- Shane King, Labor member of the Queensland Legislative Assembly for Kallangur
- Telmo Languiller, Labor member of the Victorian Legislative Assembly for Tarneit
- Brittany Lauga, Labor member of the Queensland Legislative Assembly for Keppel
- Nicole Lawder, Liberal member of the ACT Legislative Assembly for Brindabella
- Eva Lawler, Labor member of the NT Legislative Assembly for Drysdale
- Caroline Le Couteur, Australian Greens member of the ACT Legislative Assembly for Murrumbidgee
- Elizabeth Lee, Liberal member of the ACT Legislative Assembly for Kurrajong
- Michelle Lensink, Liberal member of the SA Legislative Council
- Jenny Leong, Australian Greens member of the NSW Legislative Assembly for Newtown
- Fran Logan, Labor member of the WA Legislative Assembly for Cockburn
- Scot MacDonald, Liberal member of the NSW Legislative Council
- Alannah MacTiernan, Labor member of the WA Legislative Council for North Metropolitan
- Kyam Maher, Labor member of the SA Legislative Council
- Peter Malinauskas, Labor member of the SA Legislative Council
- Shayne Mallard, Liberal member of the NSW Legislative Council
- Nicole Manison, Deputy Chief Minister of the Northern Territory and Labor member of the NT Legislative Assembly for Wanguri
- Steven Marshall, SA Opposition Leader and Liberal member of the SA House of Assembly for Dunstan
- Mark McGowan, Premier of Western Australia, Labor member of the WA Legislative Assembly for Rockingham, and former WA Opposition Leader (2012-2017)
- Simone McGurk, Labor member of the WA Legislative Assembly for Fremantle
- James Merlino, Deputy Premier of Victoria and Labor member of the Victorian Legislative Assembly for Monbulk
- Steven Miles, Labor member of the Queensland Legislative Assembly for Mount Coot-tha
- Chris Minns, Labor member of the NSW Legislative Assembly for Kogarah
- Sarah Mitchell, National member of the NSW Legislative Council
- Mike Nahan, WA Opposition Leader and Liberal member of the WA Legislative Assembly for Riverton
- Tung Ngo, Labor member of the SA Legislative Council
- Tim Nicholls, Queensland Opposition Leader and Liberal National member of the Queensland Legislative Assembly for Clayfield
- Bruce Notley-Smith, Liberal member of the NSW Legislative Assembly for Coogee
- Michael O'Brien, Liberal member of the Victorian Legislative Assembly for Malvern
- Michelle O'Byrne, Labor member of the Tasmanian House of Assembly for Bass
- Cassy O'Connor, Australian Greens member of the Tasmanian House of Assembly for Denison
- Suzanne Orr, Labor member of the ACT Legislative Assembly for Yerrabi
- Chansey Paech, Labor member of the NT Legislative Assembly for Namatjira
- Annastacia Palaszczuk, Premier of Queensland, Labor member of the Queensland Legislative Assembly for Inala, and former Queensland Opposition Leader (2012-2015)
- Tim Pallas, Labor member of the Victorian Legislative Assembly for Werribee
- Ryan Park, Labor member of the NSW Legislative Assembly for Keira
- Jamie Parker, Australian Greens member of the NSW Legislative Assembly for Balmain
- Mark Parnell, Australian Greens member of the SA Legislative Council
- Mark Parton, Liberal member of the ACT Legislative Assembly for Brindabella
- Fiona Patten, Australian Sex Party member of the Victorian Legislative Council for Northern Metropolitan
- Brian Paynter, Liberal member of the Victorian Legislative Assembly for Bass
- Greg Pearce, Liberal member of the NSW Legislative Council
- Mark Pearson, Animal Justice Party member of the NSW Legislative Council
- Joan Pease, Labor member of the Queensland Legislative Assembly for Lytton
- Duncan Pegg, Labor member of the Queensland Legislative Assembly for Stretton
- Sue Pennicuik, Australian Greens member of the Victorian Legislative Council for Southern Metropolitan
- Michael Pettersson, Labor member of the ACT Legislative Assembly for Yerrabi
- Adrian Piccoli, Nationals member of the NSW Legislative Assembly for Murray
- Greg Piper, Independent member of the NSW Legislative Assembly for Lake Macquarie
- Linus Power, Labor member of the Queensland Legislative Assembly for Logan
- Peter Primrose, Labor member of the NSW Legislative Council
- Martin Pritchard, Labor member of the WA Legislative Council for North Metropolitan
- Jaala Pulford, Labor member of the Victorian Legislative Council for the Western Victoria
- Rob Pyne, Labor-turned-Independent member of the Queensland Legislative Assembly for Cairns
- Gordon Ramsay, Labor member of the ACT Legislative Assembly for Ginninderra
- Shane Rattenbury, Australian Greens member of the ACT Legislative Assembly for Kurrajong
- Isobel Redmond, Liberal member of the SA House of Assembly for Heysen and former SA Opposition Leader (2009-2013)
- John Robertson, Labor member of the NSW Legislative Assembly for Blacktown and former NSW Opposition Leader (2011-2014)
- Jeremy Rockliff, Deputy Premier of Tasmania and Liberal member of the Tasmanian House of Assembly for Braddon
- Samantha Rowe, Labor member of the WA Legislative Council for East Metropolitan
- Peter Russo, Labor member of the Queensland Legislative Assembly for Sunnybank
- Ellen Sandell, Australian Greens member of the Victorian Legislative Assembly for Melbourne
- Amber-Jade Sanderson, Labor member of the WA Legislative Assembly for Morley
- Paul Scully, Labor member of the NSW Legislative Assembly for Wollongong
- Adam Searle, Labor member of the NSW Legislative Council
- Walt Secord, Labor member of the NSW Legislative Council
- Penny Sharpe, Labor member of the NSW Legislative Council
- Jessica Shaw, Labor member of the WA Legislative Assembly for Electoral district of Swan Hills
- Harriet Shing, Labor member of the Victorian Legislative Council for the Eastern Victoria
- David Shoebridge, Australian Greens member of the NSW Legislative Council
- Tamara Smith, Australian Greens member of the NSW Legislative Assembly for Ballina
- Nina Springle, Australian Greens member of the Victorian Legislative Council for the South-Eastern Metropolitan
- Chris Steel, Labor member of the ACT Legislative Assembly for Murrumbidgee
- Rachel Stephen-Smith, Labor member of the ACT Legislative Assembly for Kurrajong
- Nic Street, Liberal member of the Tasmanian House of Assembly for Franklin
- Jaclyn Symes, Labor member of the Victorian Legislative Council for Northern Victoria
- Sally Talbot, Labor member of the WA Legislative Council for South-West
- Gayle Tierney, Labor member of the Victorian Legislative Council for the Western Victoria
- Jackie Trad, Deputy Premier of Queensland and Labor member of the Queensland Legislative Assembly for South Brisbane
- Selena Uibo, Labor member of the NT Legislative Assembly for the Arnhem
- Rob Valentine, Independent member of the Tasmanian Legislative Council for Hobart
- Mike Veitch, Labor member of the NSW Legislative Council
- Kelly Vincent, Dignity Party member of the SA Legislative Council
- Lynda Voltz, Labor member of the NSW Legislative Council
- Stephen Wade, Liberal member of the SA Legislative Council
- Dawn Walker, Australian Greens member of the NSW Legislative Council
- Gareth Ward, Liberal member of the NSW Legislative Assembly for Kiama
- Vicki Ward, Labor member of the Victorian Legislative Assembly for Eltham
- Kate Washington, Labor member of the NSW Legislative Assembly for Port Stephens
- Anna Watson, Labor member of the NSW Legislative Assembly for Shellharbour
- Jay Weatherill, Premier of South Australia and Labor member of the SA House of Assembly for Cheltenham
- Peter Wellington, Independent member of the Queensland Legislative Assembly for Nicklin
- Rebecca White, Tasmanian Opposition Leader and Labor member of the Tasmanian House of Assembly for Lyons
- Chris Whiting, Labor member of the Queensland Legislative Assembly for Murrumba
- Felicity Wilson, Liberal member of the NSW Legislative Assembly for North Shore
- Rosalie Woodruff, Australian Greens member of the Tasmanian House of Assembly for Franklin
- Mary Wooldridge, Liberal member of the Victorian Legislative Council for the Eastern Metropolitan
- Ben Wyatt, Labor member of the WA Legislative Assembly for Victoria Park
- Richard Wynne, Labor member of the Victorian Legislative Assembly for Richmond
- Alison Xamon, Australian Greens member of the WA Legislative Council for the North Metropolitan

==== Local Politicians ====
- Gordon Bradbery, Lord Mayor of Wollongong
- Robert Doyle, Lord Mayor of Melbourne
- Christine Forster, City of Sydney Councillor and sister of former Prime Minister Tony Abbott
- Sue Hickey, Lord Mayor of Hobart
- Vicki Howard, City of Brisbane Councillor
- Clover Moore, Lord Mayor of Sydney
- Nuatali Nelmes, Lord Mayor of Newcastle
- Kerryn Phelps, City of Sydney Councillor and former Deputy Lord Mayor
- Graham Quirk, Lord Mayor of Brisbane
- Lisa Scaffidi, Lord Mayor of Perth
- Arron Wood, Deputy Lord Mayor of Melbourne

==== International ====
- Hannah Bardell, member of the Parliament of the United Kingdom
- Jeremy Corbyn, Leader of the British Labour Party
- Ruth Davidson, Leader of the Scottish Conservatives
- Nick Gibb, member of the UK Parliament
- Nikki Kaye, member of the NZ Parliament and former NZ Minister of Education
- Sadiq Khan, Mayor of London
- Theresa May, Prime Minister of the United Kingdom
- Aodhán Ó Ríordáin, Irish Senator and former Minister for Equality
- Nicola Sturgeon, First Minister of Scotland
- Justin Trudeau, Prime Minister of Canada
- Louisa Wall, member of the New Zealand Parliament

=== Organisations and agencies ===
- AccorHotels
- Adobe Systems
- AGL Energy
- Airbnb
- Allianz
- Amazon
- Ambulance Victoria
- American Express
- Amnesty International Australia
- Apple
- Arts Centre Melbourne
- Atlassian
- Australasian College for Emergency Medicine
- Australian Book Review
- Australian Centre for the Moving Image
- Australian Council of Social Service
- Australian Council of Trade Unions
- Australian Human Rights Commission
- Australian Medical Association
- Australian Medical Students' Association
- Australian Psychological Society
- Australian Securities Exchange
- Australian Services Union
- Bank Australia
- Bank of America
- Bank of Melbourne
- Bank of Queensland
- Bank of South Australia
- Bell Shakespeare
- Ben & Jerry's Australia
- beyondblue
- Black Dog Institute
- Black Inc
- Black Swan State Theatre Company
- Bloomberg
- Bonds
- Brain and Mind Centre
- Canberra Airport
- Coca-Cola Amatil
- Commonwealth Bank
- Community Action Against Homophobia
- Community and Public Sector Union
- Country Fire Authority
- Country Women's Association of Victoria
- Curtin University
- Deutsche Bank
- eBay
- Equal Love
- Early Childhood Australia
- FBi Radio
- Finance Sector Union
- Foxtel
- General Electric Australia
- GLAAD – United States
- GlaxoSmithKline
- Google
- Grindr
- Hewlett-Packard (HP)
- HSBC
- Human Rights Campaign – United States
- H&M
- IBM
- Independent Education Union of Australia
- Joy 94.9
- JPMorgan Chase
- Kmart Australia
- Law Institute of Victoria
- Law Society of New South Wales
- Levi Strauss & Co.
- LinkedIn
- Logo TV
- Malthouse Theatre, Melbourne
- Mastercard
- McDonald's
- Media, Entertainment and Arts Alliance
- Melbourne Comedy Festival
- Melbourne Theatre Company
- Melbourne University Press
- Melbourne Writers Festival
- Mercedes-Benz
- Merck & Company
- Microsoft
- Monash University
- MTV Australia
- Museums Victoria
- Musica Viva Australia
- Muslims for Progressive Values
- National Tertiary Education Union
- New South Wales Bar Association
- Origin Energy
- Oxfam Australia
- Pandora
- PayPal
- Perth Airport
- PFLAG
- Philips
- Pride in London – United Kingdom
- Pride Toronto – Canada
- Puma
- Qantas
- Queensland Ambulance Service
- Relationships Australia
- RMIT University
- Royal Bank of Canada
- salesforce.com
- Save the Children Australia
- Screen Producers Australia
- SEEK
- Socialist Alternative
- Special Broadcasting Service
- Spotify
- Subway
- Sydney Airport
- Sydney Dance Company
- Sydney Film Festival
- Sydney Gay and Lesbian Mardi Gras
- Sydney Opera House
- Sydney Symphony Orchestra
- Sydney Theatre Company
- Target Australia
- Telstra
- Adecco Group
- The Australia Institute
- The Australian Ballet
- The Body Shop
- The Foundation for Young Australians
- Tinder
- Treasury Wine Estates
- Twitter
- Uber
- UBS
- University of Technology Sydney
- Victorian Local Governance Association
- Victorian Trades Hall Council
- Virgin Australia
- Virgin Group
- Visa
- Visy
- Vodafone
- Woolwoths
- WordPress
- World Economic Forum
- Xero
- YouTube
- Zurich Insurance Group

=== Sports groups and organisations ===
- AFL Players Association
- AFL Women's
- Athletics Australia
- Australian Football League
- Australian Paralympic Committee
- Australian Rugby Union
- Australian Volleyball Federation
- Basketball Australia
- Brisbane Lions
- Collingwood Football Club
- Cricket Australia
- Cricket Victoria
- Essendon Football Club
- Football Federation Australia
- Geelong Football Club
- Gold Coast Football Club
- Greater Western Sydney Giants
- Melbourne Renegades
- Melbourne Renegades (WBBL)
- Melbourne Stars
- National Basketball League
- National Rugby League
- Netball Australia
- North Melbourne Football Club
- St Kilda Football Club
- Sydney Swans
- Tennis Australia
- Victorian Institute of Sport
- West Coast Fever
- Western Bulldogs

=== Newspapers and websites ===
- Broadsheet
- Gay Star News
- Headspace
- Herald Sun
- Junkee
- NT News
- PinkNews
- ReachOut.com
- Star Observer
- Sydney Morning Herald
- The Age
- The Conversation
- The Courier-Mail
- The Daily Telegraph
- The Guardian
- Vice News
- WordPress.com

=== State and local governments ===
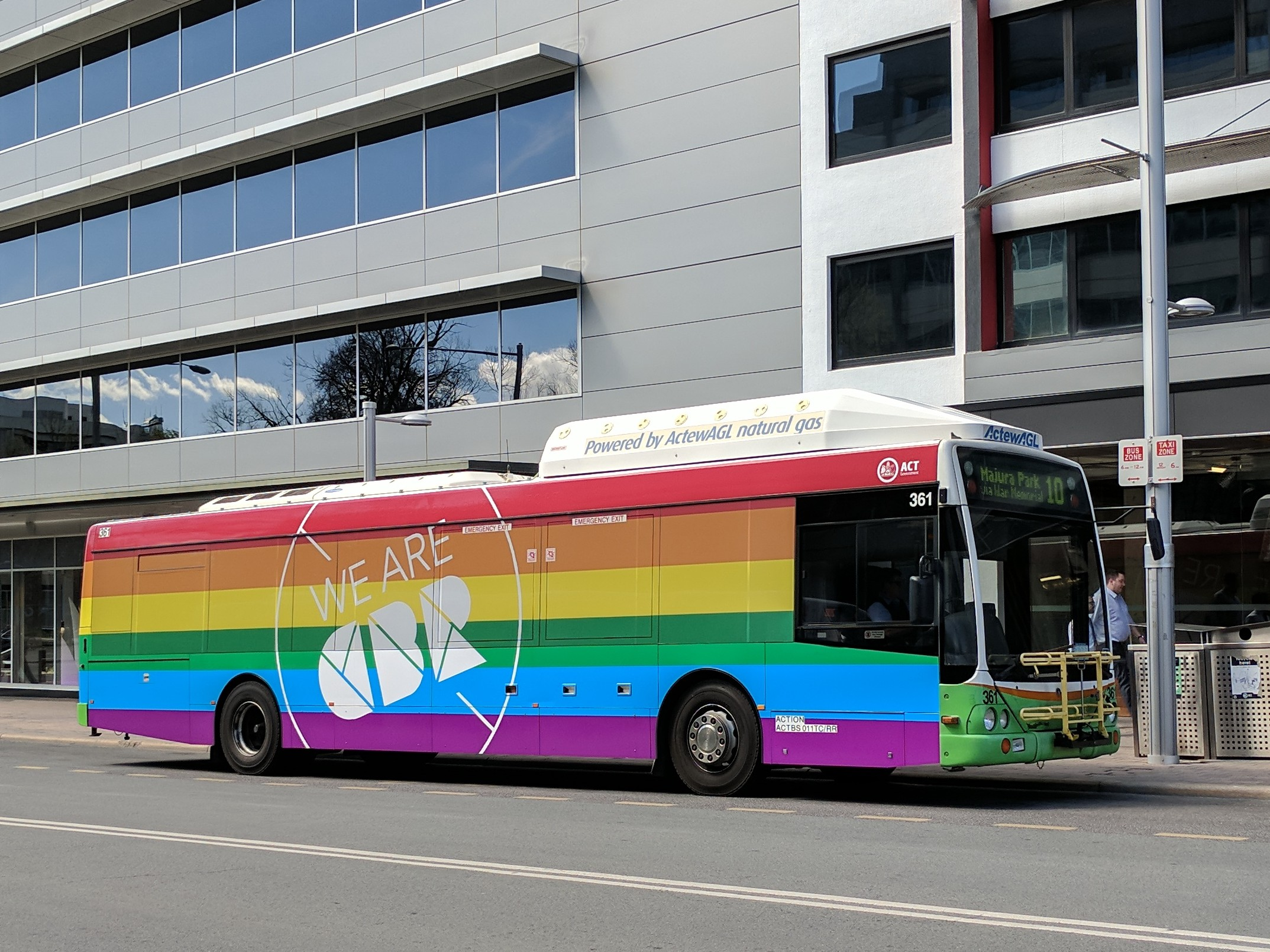
A Canberra bus marked with a rainbow as a sign of support from the ACT Government for the city's LGBTIQ community during the Australian Marriage Law Postal Survey period.

- Bellingen Shire
- City of Blue Mountains
- City of Darebin
- City of Glen Eira
- City of Greater Bendigo
- City of Hawkesbury
- City of Hobart
- City of Melbourne
- City of Moonee Valley
- City of Moreland
- City of Newcastle
- City of Port Phillip
- City of Randwick
- City of Stonnington
- City of Sydney
- City of Yarra
- Government of the Australian Capital Territory
- Inner West Council
- Shire of Campaspe
- Shire of Douglas
- Shire of Macedon Ranges

=== Religious groups ===
Religious groups who advocate a "yes" vote include:

- Australian Council of Hindu Clergy
- Buddhism Australia
- Pitt Street Uniting Church
- Quakers Australia
- Rabbinic Council of the Union for Progressive Judaism
- St Michael's Uniting Church, Melbourne

Denomination leaders who advocate a "yes" vote include:

- Frank Brennan, Catholic priest
- Kay Goldsworthy, the Anglican Archbishop of Perth

Prior to the postal survey, over 500 Australian faith leaders signed a joint letter asking the Australian Government to enact same-sex marriage. Leaders signing were Anglican, Catholic, Uniting Church, Hindu, Buddhist, Jewish and Muslim.

=== Political parties ===
- Animal Justice Party
- Australian Democrats
- Australian Greens
- Australian Labor Party
- Australian Reason Party
- Communist Party of Australia
- Derryn Hinch's Justice Party
- Liberal Democratic Party
- Nick Xenophon Team
- Socialist Alliance

=== Others ===
- Fitzy and Wippa, radio show
- Kath and Kim, television comedy
- Kinky Boots Australia, musical
- RuPaul's Drag Race, US reality competition series
- Wicked Australia & NZ, musical
- Will & Grace, US sitcom

=== Rallies ===
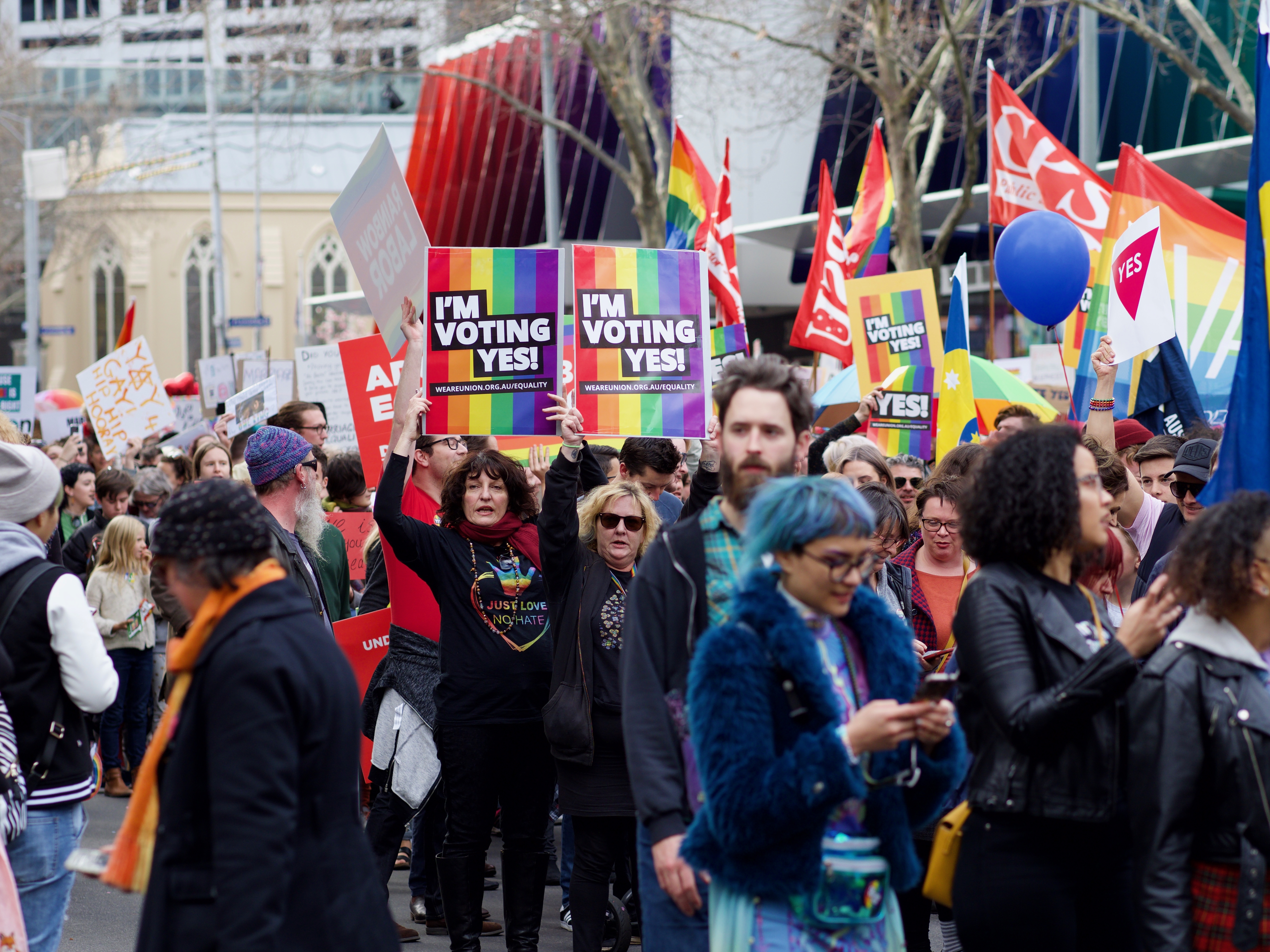
Image of the Melbourne rally in August 2017

Some of the "largest LGBTI demonstrations in Australian history" occurred in the lead-up to the postal survey in various cities. On 27 August, approximately 20,000 people attended a rally in Melbourne calling on the government to legalise same-sex marriage, whilst on 10 September more than 30,000 people gathered in Sydney's CBD supporting a "Yes" vote in the survey.

== "No" campaign ==
=== Lead lobby groups ===
- Australian Catholic Bishops' Conference (ACBC) has said, "Vote No, to keep marriage as a unique relationship between a woman and a man . . . the consequences of changing marriage are very real".
- Coalition for Marriage, a body formed by several groups opposed to same-sex marriage to co-ordinate a "No" campaign.
  - Australian Christian Lobby (ACL) advocates a "No" vote, in-part, because of the perceived implications for children.
  - Marriage Alliance states that it wants to respect same-sex attracted people but does not want to change the current definition of marriage.
- FamilyVoice Australia which advocates Voting No for freedom and for children.

=== Notable individuals ===
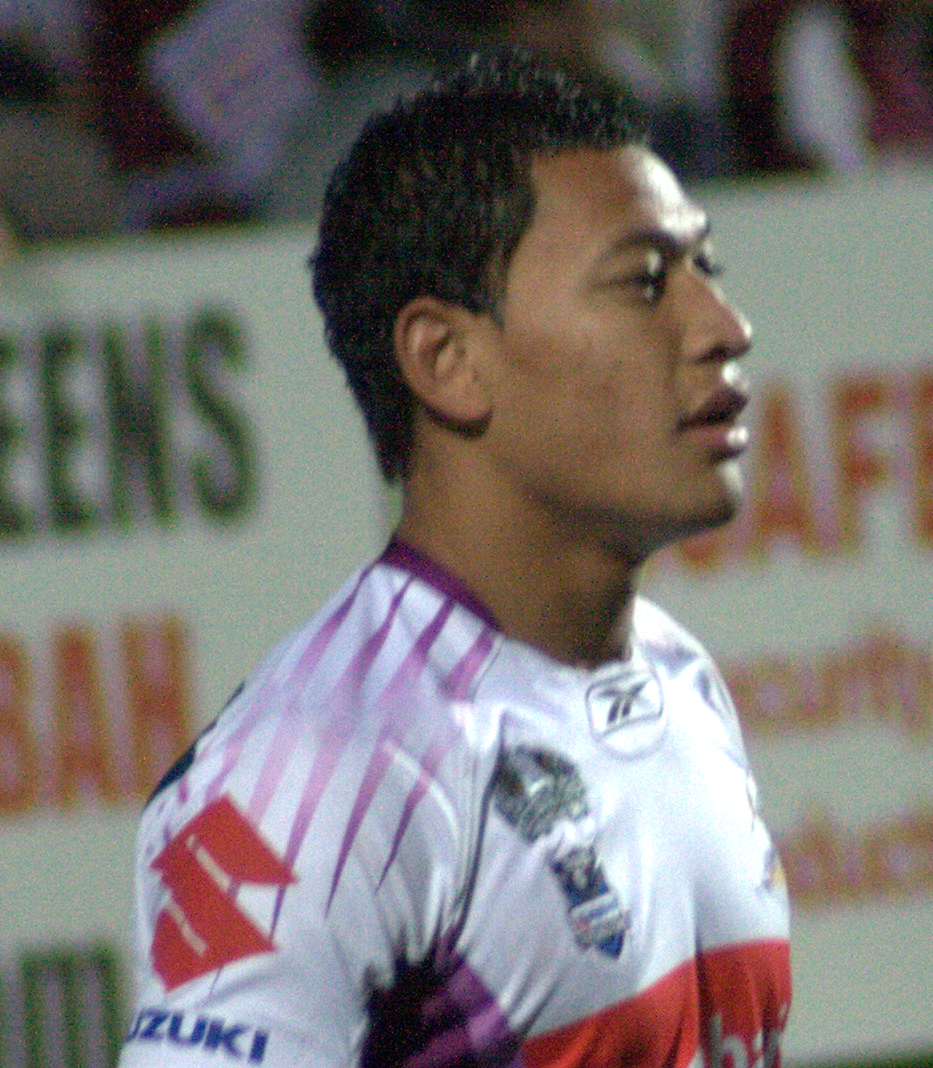
Israel Folau in 2008

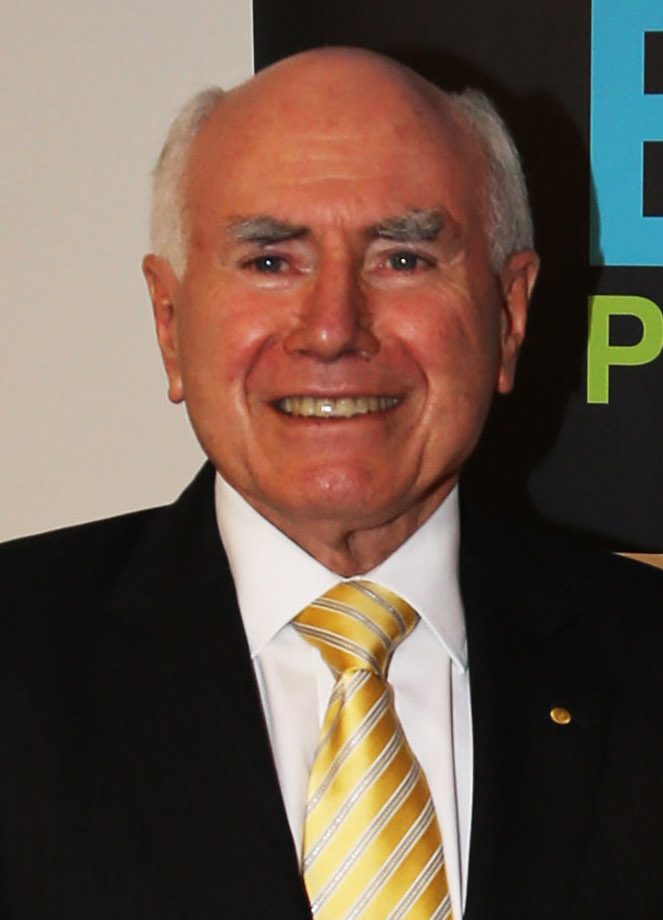
John Howard

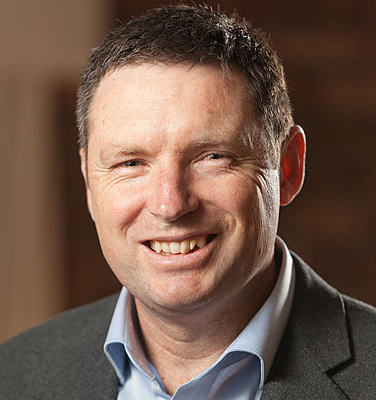
Lyle Shelton

- Roger Corbett, former CEO of Woolworths Limited and former chairman of Fairfax Media
- Kevin Donnelly, Australian educator, author and commentator
- Miranda Devine, Conservative columnist
- David Flint, legal academic
- Israel Folau, rugby union player
- Ashley Goldsworthy, Australian computer scientist and business executive
- Lyle Shelton, managing director of the Australian Christian Lobby
- Karina Okotel, federal vice president of the Liberal Party.
- Milo Yiannopoulos, far-right political commentator, polemicist, public speaker and writer

=== Politicians ===
Federal Politicians

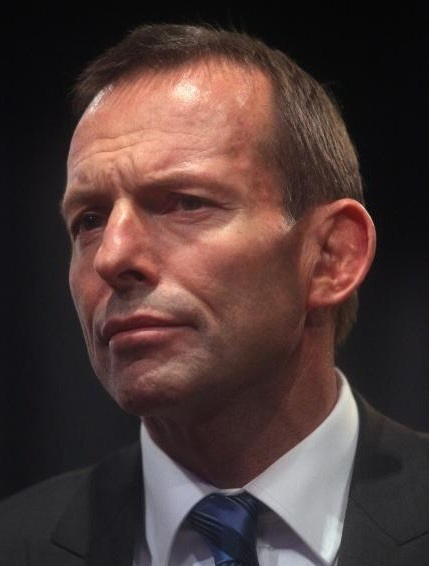
MP Tony Abbott

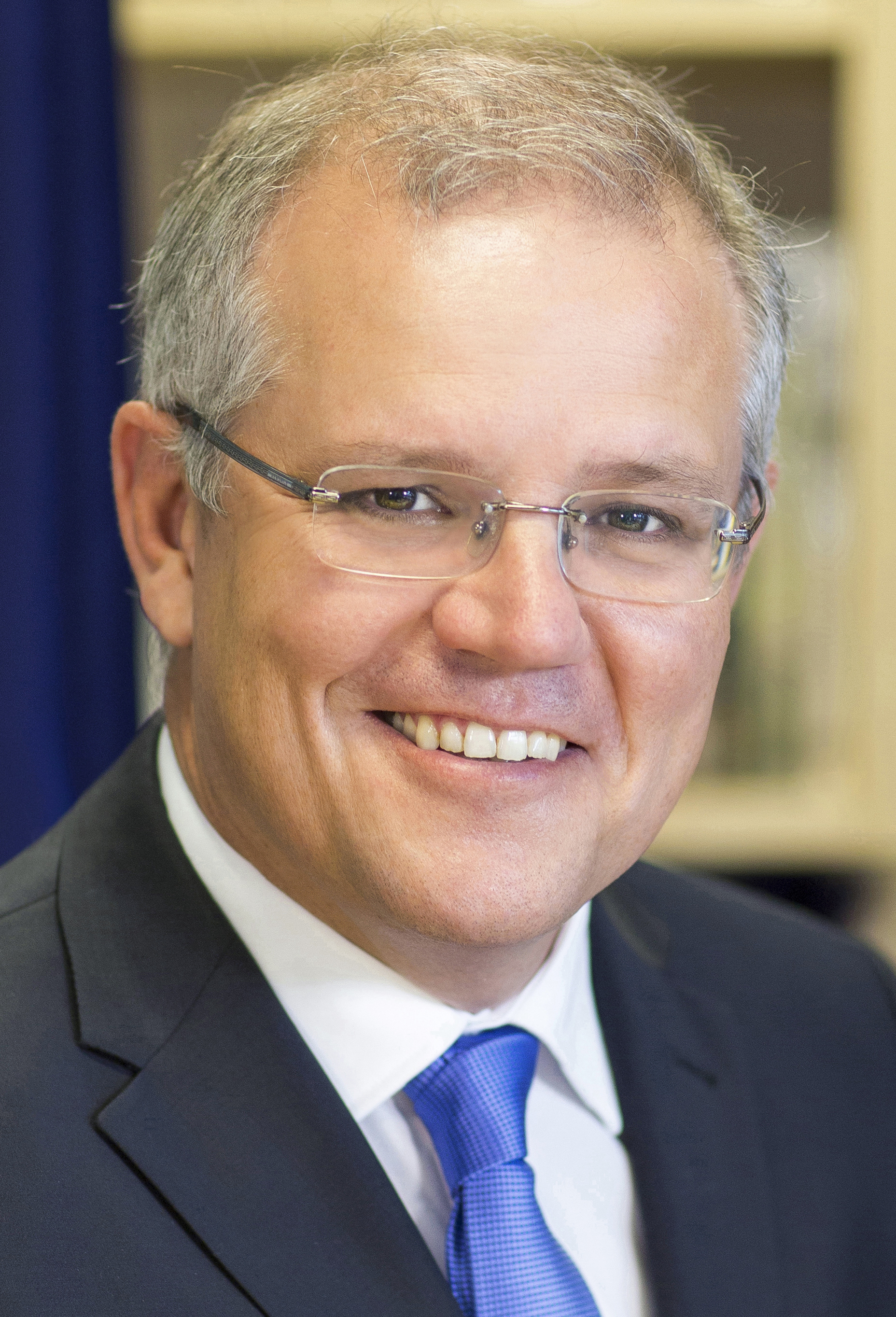
Future Prime Minister Scott Morrison

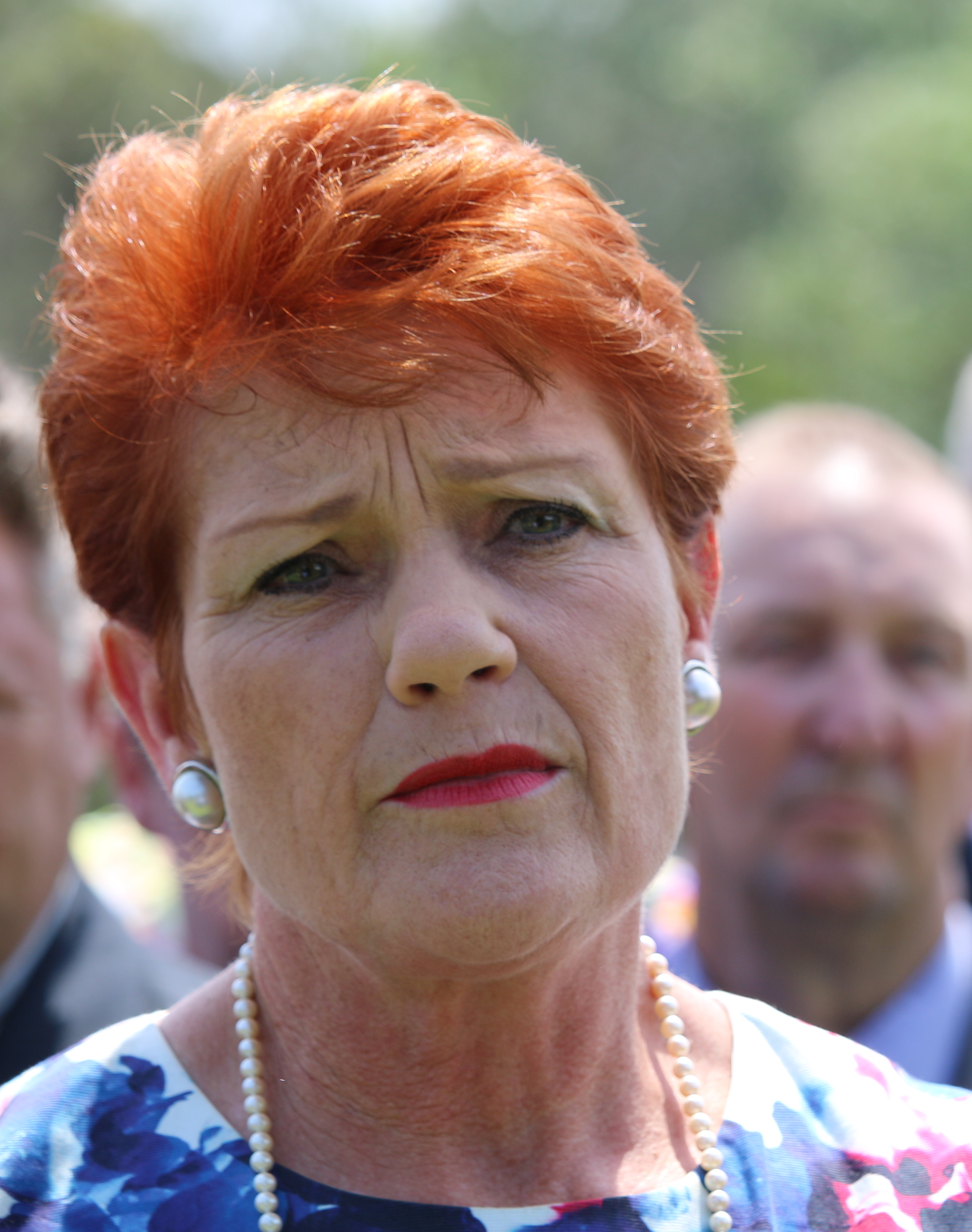
Pauline Hanson

- Tony Abbott, Liberal MP for Warringah, former Prime Minister (2013-2015), and former Opposition Leader (2009-2015)
- Eric Abetz, Liberal Senator for Tasmania
- Kevin Andrews, Liberal MP for Menzies
- Fraser Anning, One Nation Party-turned-Independent Senator for Queensland
- Cory Bernardi, Liberal-turned-Australian Conservatives Senator for South Australia
- Andrew Broad, National MP for Mallee
- Russell Broadbent, Liberal MP for McMillan and former MP for Corinella (1990-1993) and McMillan (1996-1998)
- Slade Brockman, Liberal Senator for Western Australia
- Scott Buchholz, Liberal MP for Wright
- Brian Burston, One Nation Party Senator for New South Wales
- Anthony Byrne, Labor MP for Holt
- Matt Canavan, National Senator for Queensland
- George Christensen, National MP for Dawson
- Steve Ciobo, Liberal MP for Moncrieff
- Jacinta Collins, Labor Senator for Victoria and former Senator for Victoria (1995-2005)
- Mathias Cormann, Liberal Senator for Western Australia
- Mark Coulton, National MP for Parkes
- Peter Dutton, Liberal MP for Dickson
- Don Farrell, Labor Senator for South Australia and former Senator for South Australia (2008-2014)
- David Fawcett, Liberal Senator for South Australia and former MP for Wakefield (2004-2007)
- Concetta Fierravanti-Wells, Liberal Senator for New South Wales
- Nicolle Flint, Liberal MP for Boothby
- Alex Gallacher, Labor Senator for South Australia
- Andrew Gee, National MP for Calare
- Lucy Gichuhi, Family First Party-turned-Independent Senator for South Australia
- David Gillespie, National MP for Lyne
- Ian Goodenough, Liberal MP for Moore
- Pauline Hanson, One Nation Party Senator for Queensland and former Liberal-turned-Independent-turned One Nation Party MP for Oxley (1996-1998)
- Luke Hartsuyker, National MP for Cowper
- Andrew Hastie, Liberal MP for Canning
- Alex Hawke, Liberal MP for Mitchell
- Chris Hayes, Labor MP for Fowler, former MP for Werriwa (2005-2010)
- Steve Irons, Liberal MP for Swan
- Barnaby Joyce, Deputy Prime Minister, National MP for New England, and former Senator for Queensland (2005-2013)
- Bob Katter, National-turned-Independent-turned-Katter's Australian Party MP for Kennedy
- Craig Kelly, Liberal MP for Hughes
- Chris Ketter, Labor Senator for Queensland
- Jacqui Lambie, Palmer United Party-turned-Independent-turned-Jacqui Lambie Network Senator for Tasmania
- Michelle Landry, National MP for Capricornia
- Craig Laundy, Liberal MP for Reid
- Julian Leeser, Liberal MP for Berowra
- David Littleproud, National MP for Maranoa
- Bridget McKenzie, National Senator for Victoria
- John McVeigh, Liberal member for Groom
- Scott Morrison, Liberal MP for Cook
- Ben Morton, Liberal MP for Tangney
- Deborah O'Neill, Labor Senator for New South Wales and former Labor MP for Robertson (2010-2013)
- Barry O'Sullivan, National Senator for Queensland
- Tony Pasin, Liberal MP for Barker
- Keith Pitt, National MP for Hinkler
- Helen Polley, Labor Senator for Tasmania
- Rowan Ramsey, Liberal MP for Grey
- Stuart Robert, Liberal MP for Fadden
- Zed Seselja, Liberal Senator for the Australian Capital Territory and former ACT Opposition Leader (2007-2013)
- Michael Sukkar, Liberal MP for Deakin
- Angus Taylor, Liberal MP for Hume
- Dan Tehan, Liberal MP for Wannon
- Alan Tudge, Liberal MP for Aston
- Bert van Manen, Liberal MP for Forde
- Lucy Wicks, Liberal MP for Robertson
- John Williams, National Senator for New South Wales
- Rick Wilson, Liberal MP for O'Connor
- Tony Zappia, Labor MP for Division of Makin

==== Former Federal Politicians ====
- John Anderson, former Deputy Prime Minister and National MP for Gwydir (1989-2007)
- Chris Back, former Liberal Senator for Western Australia (2009-2017)
- Bob Baldwin, former Liberal MP for Paterson (1996-1998, 2001-2016)
- Guy Barnett, former Liberal Senator for Tasmania (2002-2011)
- Bronwyn Bishop, former Liberal Senator for New South Wales (1987-1994) and former MP for Mackellar (1994-2016)
- Mark Bishop, former Labor Senator for Western Australia (1996-2014)
- Ron Boswell, former National Senator for Queensland (1983-2014)
- David Bradbury, former Labor MP for Lindsay (2007-2013)
- Neil Brown, former Liberal MP for Diamond Valley (1969-1972, 1975-1983) and Menzies (1984-1991)
- Joe Bullock, former Labor Senator for Western Australia (2014–2016).
- Alan Cadman, former Liberal MP for Mitchell (1974-2007)
- Ross Cameron, former Liberal MP for Parramatta (1996-2004)
- Barry Cohen, former Labor MP for Robertson (1969-1990)
- Stephen Conroy, former Labor Senator for Victoria (1996-2016)
- Brian Courtice, former Labor MP for Hinkler (1987-1993)
- Marshall Cooke, former Liberal MP for Petrie (1972-1974)
- Tony Crook, former National MP for O'Connor (2010-2013)
- Ron Davies, former Labor MP for Braddon (1958-1975)
- Bob Day, former Family First Party Senator for South Australia (2014-2017)
- Pat Farmer, former Liberal MP for Macarthur (2001-2010)
- Michael Ferguson, former Liberal MP for Bass (2004-2007)
- Steve Fielding, former Family First Party Senator for Victoria (2005-2011)
- Tim Fischer, former Deputy Prime Minister and National MP for Farrer (1984-2001)
- Jim Forbes, former Liberal MP for Barker (1956-1975)
- Michael Forshaw, former Labor Senator for New South Wales (1994-2011)
- Mark Furner, former Labor Senator for Queensland (2008-2014)
- Peter Hendy, former Liberal MP for Eden-Monaro (2013-2016)
- John Hogg, former Labor Senator for Queensland (1996-2014)
- John Howard, former Prime Minister (1996-2007), former Opposition Leader (1985-1989, 1995-1996), and Liberal MP for Bennelong (1974-2007)
- Steve Hutchins, former Labor Senator for New South Wales (1998-2011)
- Dennis Jensen, former Liberal-turned-Independent MP for Tangney (2004-2016)
- Gary Johns, former Labor MP for Petrie (1987-1996)
- Mark Latham, former Opposition Leader (2003-2005) and Labor MP for Werriwa (1994-2005)
- Joanna Lindgren, former Liberal Senator for Queensland (2015-2016)
- Geoff Lyons, former Labor MP for Bass (2010-2013)
- John Madigan, former Democratic Labour Party-turned-Independent Senator for Victoria (2011-2016)
- Brett Mason, former Liberal Senator for Queensland (1999-2015)
- Karen McNamara, former Liberal MP for Dobell (2013-2016)
- Tom McVeigh, former National MP for Darling Downs (1972-1984) and Groom (1984-1988)
- Chris Miles, former Liberal member for Braddon (1984-1998)
- Nick Minchin, former Liberal Senator for South Australia (1993-2011)
- Sophie Mirabella, former Liberal MP for Indi (2001-2013)
- John Murphy, former Labor MP for Lowe (1998-2010) and Reid (2010-2013)
- Paul Neville, former National MP for Hinkler (1993-2013)
- Andrew Nikolic, former Liberal MP for Bass (2013-2016)
- Bill O'Chee, former National Senator for Queensland (1990-1999)
- Malcolm Roberts, former One Nation Party Senator for Queensland (2016-2017)
- Patrick Secker, former Liberal MP for Barker (1998-2013)
- Luke Simpkins, former Liberal MP for Cowan (2007-2016)
- Peter Slipper, former National-turned-Liberal-turned-Independent MP for Fisher (1984-1987, 1993-2013)
- Ursula Stephens, former Labor Senator for New South Wales (2002-2014)
- Tony Street, former Liberal MP for Corangamite (1966-1984)
- Mike Symon, former Labor MP for Deakin (2007-2013)
- Dave Tollner, former Liberal MP for Solomon (2001-2007) and former Deputy Chief Minister of the Northern Territory (2013-2014)
- Warren Truss, former Deputy Prime Minister (2013-2016) and National MP for Wide Bay (1990-2016)
- Wilson Tuckey, former Liberal MP for O'Connor (1980-2010)
- Nickolas Varvaris, former Liberal MP for Barton (2013-2016)
- Brett Whiteley, former Liberal MP for Braddon (2013-2016)

==== State and Territory Politicians ====
- Rosemary Armitage, Independent member of the Tasmanian Legislative Council for Launceston
- Colin Barnett, Liberal member of the WA Legislative Assembly for Cottesloe, former Premier of Western Australia (2008-2017), and former WA Opposition Leader (2001-2005, 2008)
- Guy Barnett, Liberal member of the Tasmanian House of Assembly for Lyons
- Ros Bates, Liberal National member of the Queensland Legislative Assembly for Mudgeeraba
- Stephen Bennett, Liberal National member of the Queensland Legislative Assembly for Burnett
- Robert Brokenshire, Family First Party-turned-Australian Conservatives member of the SA Legislative Council
- David Clarke, Liberal member of the NSW Legislative Council
- Alistair Coe, ACT Opposition Leader and Liberal member of the ACT Legislative Assembly for Yerrabi
- Rick Colless, Liberal member of the NSW Legislative Council
- Jason Costigan, Liberal National member of the Queensland Legislative Assembly for Whitsunday
- Andrew Cripps, Liberal National member of the Queensland Legislative Assembly for Hinchinbrook
- John Dawkins, Liberal member of the SA Legislative Council
- Ivan Dean, Independent member of the Tasmanian Legislative Council for Windermere
- Steve Dickson, Liberal National-turned-One Nation Party member of the Queensland Legislative Assembly for Buderim
- Greg Donnelly, Labor member of the NSW Legislative Council
- Vicki Dunne, Liberal member of the ACT Legislative Assembly for Ginninderra
- Michael Ferguson, Liberal member of the Tasmanian House of Assembly for Bass
- Bernie Finn, Liberal member of the Victorian Legislative Council for Western Metropolitan
- Mark Furner, Labor member of the Queensland Legislative Assembly for Ferny Grove
- Michael Gidley, Liberal member of the Victorian Legislative Assembly for Mount Waverley
- Nick Goiran, Liberal member of the WA Legislative Council for the South Metropolitan
- Vanessa Goodwin, Liberal member of the Tasmanian Legislative Council for Pembroke
- Paul Green, Christian Democratic Party member of the NSW Legislative Council
- Chris Gulaptis, National member of the NSW Legislative Assembly for Clarence
- Greg Hall, Independent member of the Tasmanian Legislative Council for Western Tiers
- Martin Hamilton-Smith, Liberal-turned-Independent member of the SA House of Assembly for Waite and SA Opposition Leader (2007-2009)
- Rene Hidding, Liberal member of the Tasmanian House of Assembly for Lyons and former Tasmanian Opposition Leader (2002-2006)
- Dennis Hood, Family First Party-turned-Australian Conservatives member of the SA Legislative Council
- Giulia Jones, Liberal member of the ACT Legislative Assembly for Murrumbidgee
- Marlene Kairouz, Labor member of the Victorian Legislative Assembly for Kororoit
- Robbie Katter, Katter's Australian Party member of the Queensland Legislative Assembly for Mount Isa
- Tom Kenyon, Labor member of the SA House of Assembly for Newland
- Elizabeth Kikkert, Liberal member of the ACT Legislative Assembly for Ginninderra
- Shane Knuth, Katter's Australian Party member of the Queensland Legislative Assembly for Dalrymple
- Tom Koutsantonis, Labor member of the SA House of Assembly for West Torrens
- Jon Krause, Liberal National member of the Queensland Legislative Assembly for Beaudesert
- Ann Leahy, Liberal National member of the Queensland Legislative Assembly for Warrego
- Jing Lee, Liberal member of the SA Legislative Council
- David Llewellyn, Labor member of the Tasmanian House of Assembly for Lyons and former Deputy Premier of Tasmania (2004-2006)
- Rob Lucas, Liberal member of the SA Legislative Council
- Natasha Maclaren-Jones, Liberal member of the NSW Legislative Council
- Daryl Maguire, Liberal member of the NSW Legislative Assembly for Wagga Wagga
- Tim Mander, Liberal National member of the Queensland Legislative Assembly for Everton
- Matthew Mason-Cox, Liberal member of the NSW Legislative Council
- Lachlan Millar, Liberal National member of the Queensland Legislative Assembly for Gregory
- James Milligan, Liberal member of the ACT Legislative Assembly for Yerrabi
- Terry Mills, Country Liberal-turned-Independent member of the NT Legislative Assembly for Blain, former Chief Minister of the Northern Territory (2012-2013), and former NT Opposition Leader (2003-2005, 2008-2012)
- Shaoquett Moselmane, Labor member of the NSW Legislative Council
- Fred Nile, Christian Democratic Party member of the NSW Legislative Council
- Madeleine Ogilvie, Labor member of the Tasmanian House of Assembly for Denison
- Tony Perrett, Liberal National member of the Queensland Legislative Assembly for Gympie
- Dominic Perrottet, Liberal member of the NSW Legislative Assembly for Hawkesbury
- Jacquie Petrusma, Liberal member of the Tasmanian House of Assembly for Denison
- Inga Peulich, Liberal member of the Victorian Legislative Council for South-Eastern Metropolitan
- Andrew Powell, Liberal National member of the Queensland Legislative Assembly for Glass House
- James Purcell, Vote 1 Local Jobs member of the Victorian Legislative Council for Western Victoria
- Tania Rattray, Independent member of the Tasmanian Legislative Council for Apsley
- Ian Rickuss, Liberal National member of the Queensland Legislative Assembly for Lockyer
- David Ridgway, Liberal member of the SA Legislative Council
- Anthony Roberts, Liberal member of the NSW Legislative Assembly for Lane Cove
- Mark Robinson, Liberal National member of the Queensland Legislative Assembly for Cleveland
- Christian Rowan, Liberal National member of the Queensland Legislative Assembly for Moggill
- Joan Rylah, Liberal member of the Tasmanian House of Assembly for Braddon
- Mark Shelton, Liberal member of the Tasmanian House of Assembly for Lyons
- Fiona Simpson, Liberal National member of the Queensland Legislative Assembly for Maroochydore
- Tarnya Smith, Liberal National member of the Queensland Legislative Assembly for Mount Ommaney
- Jack Snelling, Labor member of the SA House of Assembly for Playford
- Lawrence Springborg, Liberal National member of the Queensland Legislative Assembly for Southern Downs and former Queensland Opposition Leader (2003-2006, 2008-2009, 2015-2016)
- Terry Stephens, Liberal member of the SA Legislative Council
- Murray Thompson, Liberal member of the Victorian Legislative Assembly for Sandringham
- Paul Toole, National member of the NSW Legislative Assembly for Bathurst
- Damien Tudehope, Liberal member of the NSW Legislative Assembly for Epping
- Andrew Wall, Liberal member of the ACT Legislative Assembly for Brindabella
- Trevor Watts, Liberal National member of the Queensland Legislative Assembly for Toowoomba North
- Pat Weir, Liberal National member of the Queensland Legislative Assembly for Condamine
- Jim Wilkinson, Independent member of the Tasmanian Legislative Council for Nelson
- Ray Williams, Liberal member of the NSW Legislative Assembly for Castle Hill
- Ernest Wong, Labor member of the NSW Legislative Council
- Gerry Wood, Independent member of the NT Legislative Assembly for Nelson

=== Organisations and agencies ===
- Antipodean Resistance, Neo-Nazi and fascist group
- United Patriots Front, far-right nationalist anti-Islam organisation

=== Religious groups ===
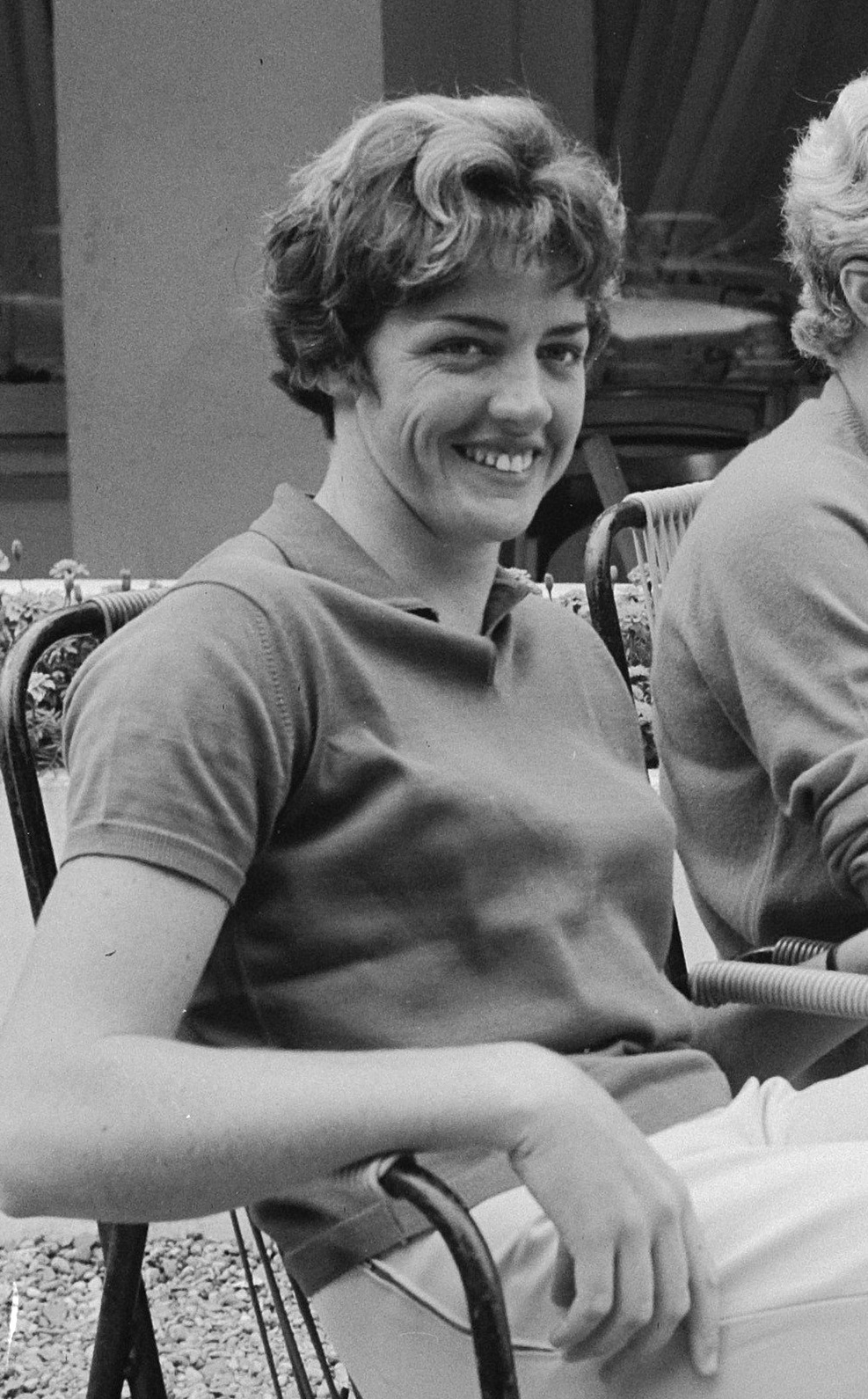
Margaret Court in 1964

Religious groups who advocate a "no" vote include:
- Anglican Diocese of Sydney
- Anglican Diocese of Tasmania
- Australian Baptist Ministries
- Australian Christian Churches
- Australian Family Association
- Australian National Imams Council
- C3 Churchl
- Catholic schools in NSW
- Christian Community Churches
- Christian Schools Australia
- Coptic Orthodox Church
- CRC Churches International
- Fellowship of Congregational Churches
- Lutheran Church of Australia
- National Catholic Education Commission
- National Civic Council
- Presbyterian Church of Australia
- Serbian Orthodox Church
- Seventh-day Adventist Church

Denominational leaders who advocate a "no" vote include:

- Shady Alsuleiman, leader of The Muslim Political Action Committee
- Timothy Costelloe, the Catholic Archbishop of Perth
- Glenn Davies, the Anglican Archbishop of Sydney
- Anthony Fisher, the Catholic Archbishop of Sydney
- Philip Freier, Primate of Australia, Anglican Church of Australia
- Philip Wilson, the Catholic Archbishop of Adelaide
- Moshe Gutnick, Head of the Organisation of Rabbis of Australasia
- Stylianos Harkianakis, the Greek Orthodox Archbishop of Australia
- Tim Harris, the Catholic Archbishop of Townsville
- Denis Hart, the Catholic Archbishop of Melbourne
- Vincent Long, the Catholic Bishop of Parramatta
- Ibrahim Abu Mohamed, the Grand Mufti of Australia
- Danny Nalliah, evangelical Christian pastor and leader of the Rise Up Australia political party
- Julian Porteous, the Catholic Archbishop of Hobart
- Christopher Prowse, the Catholic Archbishop of Canberra and Goulburn
- Keysar Trad, Islamic community leader

Religious leaders who advocate a "no" vote include:

- Margaret Court, senior pastor of "Victory Life Centre" Pentecostal church and former tennis Grand Slam champion
- Brian Houston, senior pastor of Hillsong Church
- Michael Jensen, Anglican priest

=== Political parties ===
- Australian Christians
- Australian Conservatives
- Australia First Party
- Australian Liberty Alliance
- Australian Protectionist Party
- Christian Democratic Party
- Democratic Labour Party
- Katter's Australian Party
- Liberal National Party of Queensland (Party Position Only, MP's allowed to hold various views)
- Rise Up Australia Party

== Neutral ==
=== Organisations and agencies ===
- Australia and New Zealand Banking Group (ANZ)
- Australian Broadcasting Corporation (ABC)
- Australia Post
- Deloitte Access Economics
- Holden
- Optus
- REA Group
- The Salvation Army

=== Sports groups and organisations ===
- Australian Olympic Committee
- Carlton Football Club
- Fremantle Football Club
- Hawthorn Football Club
- Swimming Australia
- West Coast Eagles

=== State and local governments ===
- City of Brisbane

=== Political parties ===
- Jacqui Lambie Network
- Liberal Party of Australia
- Pauline Hanson's One Nation
