= Ezekiel Tsoukalas =

The Most Reverend Ezekiel Tsoukalas
- Archbishop of Australia
- Installed: 1959
- Term ended: 1974
- Predecessor: Theophylactos Papathanasopoulos
- Successor: Archbishop Stylianos

Personal details
- Born: Ezekiel Tsoukalas; 13 May 1913 Patras, Greece
- Died: 22 July 1987 (aged 74) Athens, Greece

Archbishop Ezekiel Tsoukalas (Greek: Ιεζεκιήλ Τσουκαλάς; 13 May 1913 – 22 July 1987) was a Greek bishop and the first Archbishop of Australia in the Greek Orthodox Archdiocese of Australia.

Archbishop Ezekiel was an assistant bishop in the Greek Orthodox Archdiocese of America from 1950 to 1959. He had served as a bishop in Boston and Chicago. He had been assistant director of Holy Cross Greek Orthodox School of Theology in Brookline, Massachusetts, in 1943 and became director in 1949.

== Archbishop of Australia ==
Archbishop Ezekiel was elected the fourth Metropolitan of Australia and New Zealand in February 1959. He replaced Metropolitan Theophylactos Papathanasopoulos, the third metropolitan, who was killed in a car crash in 1958. On 1 September 1959, the Metropolis of Australia and New Zealand was elevated to an Archdiocese and Metropolitan Ezekiel was elevated to Archbishop. In 1970 the Metropolis of New Zealand was created, so Archbishop Ezekiel became the Archbishop of Australia.

During his service in Australia, 53 Greek Orthodox Communities and Parishes were established across the country.

In August 1974, the Ecumenical Patriarchate promoted Archbishop Ezekiel to the Metropolis of Pisidia where he remained until 1987. He died in Athens in July 1987.

On 3 February 1975, the Holy Synod of the Ecumenical Patriarchate unanimously elected the Metropolitan of Miletoupolis, Archbishop Stylianos, a lecturer at the University of Thessaloniki, as the new Archbishop of Australia.

Eastern Orthodox Church titles
Preceded by Bishop Athenagoras	Bishop of Boston; 1950–1954	Succeeded by Bishop Athenagoras
Preceded by Theophylactos Papathanasopoulos	Metropolitan of Australia and New Zealand; 1959	Succeeded by -
Preceded by -	Archbishop of Australia and New Zealand; 1959–1970	Succeeded by -
Preceded by -	Archbishop of Australia; 1970–1974	Succeeded by Archbishop Stylianos
