= Stylianos Harkianakis =

Eastern Orthodox archbishop

His Eminence Stylianos
- Archbishop of Australia
- Native name: Στυλιανός Χαρκιανάκης
- Diocese: Greek Orthodox Archdiocese of Australia
- Installed: 26 April 1975
- Term ended: 25 March 2019
- Predecessor: Ezekiel (Tsoukalas)
- Successor: Makarios (Griniezakis)
- Previous post: Metropolitan of Militoupolis (1970-1975)

Orders
- Consecration: 1970

Personal details
- Born: Stylianos Harkianakis; 29 December 1935 Rethymno, Crete, Kingdom of Greece
- Died: 25 March 2019 (aged 83) Sydney, New South Wales, Australia
- Buried: Rookwood Cemetery
- Denomination: Eastern Orthodox Christian
- Education: University of Bonn

Archbishop Stylianos (Secular name: Stylianos Harkianakis, Greek: Στυλιανός Χαρκιανάκης) (b. 29 December 1935 – d. 25 March 2019) was the Greek Orthodox Archbishop of Australia and Primate of the Greek Orthodox Archdiocese of Australia. He served as inaugural and permanent Chairman of the Standing Conference of Canonical Orthodox Churches in Australia and Dean of St Andrew's Greek Orthodox Theological College. He was a theologian specialising in ecclesiology and also a poet.

== Overview ==
Stylianos Harkianakis was born in Rethymno on the island of Crete, Greece, on 29 December 1935. He studied theology at the Theological School of Halki on the island of Halki and graduated in 1958. He was ordained a deacon in 1957 and a priest in 1958. He completed postgraduate studies in systematic theology and the philosophy of religion at the University of Bonn in West Germany from 1958 to 1966. His lecturers included Joseph Ratzinger, who later became Pope Benedict XVI. He wrote his thesis on the concept that the Orthodox Church possessed infallibility when it acted together in conciliarity (e.g. the Ecumenical Councils). At that time, the idea of infallibility was thought to be an exclusively Roman Catholic idea, entirely alien to the Orthodox Church.

In 1965, whilst still completing his postgraduate studies, Harkianakis was appointed Professor of Theology at the University of Athens. In 1966, he was appointed abbot of the Holy Patriarchal Monastery of Vlatodon, in Thessaloniki. He was a founding member, then became vice-president and later president, of the Patriarchal Institute of Patristic Studies within the monastery. From 1969 to 1975, he lectured in systematic theology at the University of Thessaloniki.

In 1970, Harkianakis was elected the Titular Metropolitan of Militoupolis (whilst remaining in the Holy Monastery of Vlatadon) as exarch in matters concerning Northern Greece and Mount Athos.

== Archbishop of Australia ==
On 3 February 1975, Harkianakis was elected Archbishop of Australia and Exarch of Oceania. He arrived in Sydney on 15 April and was enthroned on 26 April (Saturday of Lazarus). In this role, he engaged in many dialogues between Orthodoxy and other Christian groups, most prominently as co-chairman of the theological dialogue with the Roman Catholic Church, but also as co-chairman of the dialogue with the Anglican churches.

Harkianakis taught Orthodox theology and spirituality at Sydney University from 1975. In 1986 he became the inaugural dean of St Andrew's Theological College where he also served as Lecturer in Systematic Theology.

Harkianakis was the plaintiff in a defamation suit against journalist Theo Skalkos and a contempt case for articles published by Skalkos which were said to amount to public vilification to deter Harkianakis from continuing to bring defamation suits.

Harkianakis died following a lengthy illness in Sydney on 25 March 2019, on the Holy Day of the Annunciation of the Theotokos.

== Awards ==
In 1973, Harkianakis was awarded the International Award Gottfried von Herder. A noted poet with an extensive bibliography, he was given the Award for Poetry from the Academy of Athens in 1980. In 1985 he received an honorary doctorate from Lublin University, Poland. One of his poems, "After Ephialtes", was set to music by Costas Tsicaderis.

== Bibliography ==
- Harkianakis, Stylianos (2008). The Infallibility of the Church in Orthodox Theology. Sydney: St Andrew's Orthodox Press. ISBN 9781920691981.

Eastern Orthodox Church titles
Preceded by Ezekiel (Tsoukalas)	Archbishop of Australia; 1975–2019	Succeeded by Makarios (Griniezakis)
