= Greek Orthodox Archbishop of Australia =

The Archbishop of Australia is the Representative of the Ecumenical Patriarchate for the Greek Orthodox Archdiocese of Australia, a jurisdiction of the Greek Orthodox Church under the Ecumenical Patriarchate in the Eastern Orthodox Christian religion. The position was most recently held by Archbishop Stylianos.

List of Ecumenical Patriarchate Greek Orthodox Archbishops of Australia:

- Ezekiel Tsoukalas of Nazianzos (1 September 1959 – August 1974)
- Stylianos Harkianakis (26 April 1975 – 25 March 2019)
- Makarios Griniezakis – 29 June 2019

== History ==
On 1 September 1959, the 'Metropolis of Australia and New Zealand' was elevated to Archdiocese and Metropolitan Ezekiel was elevated to Archbishop. In August 1974, the Ecumenical Patriarchate promoted Archbishop Ezekiel to the Metropolis of Pisidia.

On 3 February 1975, the Holy Synod of the Ecumenical Patriarchate unanimously elected Metropolitan of Miletoupolis Stylianos Harkianakis, lecturer at the University of Thessaloniki, as the new Archbishop of Australia. He arrived in Sydney on 15 April 1975 and was officially enthroned on Lazarus Saturday on 26 April 1975.
