= Evmenios Vasilopoulos =

Greek Orthodox bishop in Australia

His Grace Evmenios
- Chorbishop of the Diocese of Chora
- Church: Ecumenical Patriarchate of Constantinople
- Archdiocese: Greek Orthodox Archdiocese of Australia
- Diocese: Diocese of Chora
- Elected: 30 August 2021
- Installed: 2024

Orders
- Ordination: Diaconate: 22 April 2007; Priesthood: 9 December 2007
- Consecration: 20 November 2021 by Archbishop Makarios of Australia
- Rank: Chorbishop

Personal details
- Born: Seraphim Vasilopoulos; 1981 (age 44–45) Melbourne, Australia
- Denomination: Eastern Orthodoxy
- Residence: Melbourne, Australia
- Parents: John Vasilopoulos; Vasiliki Vasilopoulou
- Profession: Chairperson of the Board of Directors for St Basil's Aged Care Homes in Victoria
- Education: Monash Secondary College
- Alma mater: St Andrew's Greek Orthodox Theological College

Evmenios of Chora (secular name Seraphim Vasilopoulos; born 1981) is the chorbishop of the Diocese of Chora, under the jurisdiction of the Greek Orthodox Archdiocese of Australia in the Ecumenical Patriarchate of Constantinople.

== Biography ==
=== Early life and education ===
Seraphim Vasilopoulos was born in 1981 to John and Vasiliki Vasilopoulos, in Melbourne, Victoria. He grew up in Melbourne's south-eastern suburbs, having attended secondary education at Monash Secondary College. He later received a tertiary education at St Andrew's Greek Orthodox Theological College in Redfern, New South Wales. Here, he attained a Bachelor's Degree in Theology, and later a Master's Degree of Arts in Pastoral Care, from the Sydney College of Divinity.

=== Life as a clergyman ===
On the 22nd of April, 2007, on the Orthodox feast day of the Sunday of the Myrrhbearers, the monk Evmenios was ordained a deacon by His Grace, Bishop (now Metropolitan) Ezekiel of Dervis, at the Church of St. Eustathios, South Melbourne. At that time, the newly-ordained Fr. Deacon Evmenios was assigned to St. Spyridon Parish of South East Sydney.

Later that year, on the 9th of December, Fr. Deacon Evmenios was ordained a priest by His Eminence, Archbishop Stylianos of Australia. Immediately after, he was assigned as the parish priest of the Church of the Transfiguration of the Lord in Thomastown, Victoria. On the 2nd of February, 2009, Fr. Evmenios was elevated to the rank of Archimandrite, and in the following year, blessed to be a spiritual confessor - both by Archbishop Stylianos.

In October 2019, the ecclesiastical administration of the state of Victoria was split into two, with a new archdiocesan district announced for Northcote, Victoria. The following month, His Eminence, Archbishop Makarios of Australia announced in an encyclical that the Very Reverend Fr. Archimandrite Evmenios Vasilopoulos would become the Archiepiscopal Vicar of this district, along with various other changes to the archdiocese. As Fr. Evmenios' community were unsure about the change, he assured them that it was "done out of a practical sense, there is no divisiveness in it."

Following the resignation of Konstantinos Kontis as Chairperson of the Board of Directors of St. Basil's Aged Care in Victoria, Archbishop Makarios announced that Archimandrite Evmenios would take his place as Chairperson.

=== Life as a bishop ===
In 2021, following the retirement of His Grace, Bishop Ezekiel of Dervis from episcopal duties, the Holy Synod of the Ecumenical Patriarchate of Constantinople informed the Archdiocese of Australia of its decision to elect four new assistant bishops. Among these four was His Grace, Bishop-elect Evmenios. Given the strict restrictions in place due to the pandemic, his ordination to the episcopate was set for the 20th of November, 2021. Bishop Ezekiel of Dervis was also elevated to Metropolitan.

Bishop-elect Evmenios was ordained a bishop by Archbishop Makarios of Australia at the Parish of St. Nicholas in Marrickville, New South Wales. Also in attendance were His Eminence Metropolitan Ezekiel of Dervis, and their Graces, Bishop Iakovos of Miletoupolis, Emilianos of Meloa (now resigned), Elpidios of Kyaneon, Silouan of Sinope, Kyriakos of Sozopolis, and Christodoulos of Magnesia. Among the congregation was the Most Reverend Anthony Fisher, Catholic Archbishop of Sydney. In his personal address, Bishop Evmenios, after thanking the Holy Synod for his election, mentioned his parents, who "sacrificed everything to offer him and his siblings a warm Christian family". He later mentioned his first spiritual father, Fr. Nikolaos Moutafis, who guided him through his time as a parishioner at Sts. Anargiri Greek Orthodox parish in Oakleigh, Victoria. In that parish, Bishop Evmenios met the then Assistant Bishop of the Archdiocese, Ezekiel of Dervis, who inspired him and encouraged the idea of theological tertiary education. The new bishop concluded by thanking the late Archbishop Stylianos, and the parish where he formerly served in Thomastown.

Archbishop Makarios also made an address in which he appointed Bishop Evmenios as the CEO of St. Basil's Aged Care in Victoria.

An assistant bishop, Bishop Evmenios was assigned the titular see of Kerasounta, a city on the Black Sea (Giresun in Turkey).

On the 18th of December, 2021, Bishop Evmenios of Kerasounta conducted his first baptism service after his consecration to the episcopate, baptising a French agnostic convert into the Eastern Orthodox Church.

Following a convention of the Holy Synod of the Ecumenical Patriarchate in July 2024, six new dioceses were established across the Greek Orthodox Archdiocese of Australia, to enhance the pastoral care of Orthodox believers in the country. One of these dioceses was the Diocese of Chora (previously known as the Archiepiscopal District of Northcote). As Bishop Evmenios was still in the position of Archiepiscopal Vicar, he became the newly-elected chorbishop of the Diocese of Chora.
