= Athinagoras Karakonstantakis =

Greek Orthodox bishop in Australia

His Grace Athinagoras Bishop of Canberra
- Native name: Αθηναγόρας Καρακωνσταντάκης
- Church: Eastern Orthodox Church
- Archdiocese: Greek Orthodox Archdiocese of Australia
- Diocese: Holy Diocese of Canberra
- Elected: 29 August 2025
- Previous post: Archdeacon of the Greek Orthodox Archdiocese of Australia

Orders
- Ordination: 3 November 2017 by Archbishop Makarios of Australia (then Bishop of Christoupolis)

Personal details
- Born: Georgios Karakonstantakis; 1984 (age 41–42) Heraklion, Crete
- Citizenship: Greek
- Education: University of Crete; Stanford University

Bishop Athinagoras (born secular name: Georgios Karakonstantakis, Greek: Γεώργιος Καρακωνσταντάκης) was born in 1984 in Heraklion, Crete. He was the former Archdeacon of Greek Orthodox Archdiocese of Australia, and since September 2025, is the Regional Bishop of the Diocese of Canberra.

== Early life and education ==
Georgios Karakonstantakis was born to Manolis Karakonstantakis, a former PASOK executive, in 1984. He completed his secondary education, and began his tertiary education in Heraklion.

He studied Physics at the University of Crete, graduating first in his class and receiving a Bachelor's degree in Physics in 2006 and a Master's degree in Computational and Theoretical Physics in 2008. Georgios later found himself in the United States, taking postgraduate studies at Stanford University. There, he earned a Master of Science in Solid State Physics in 2010, and a PhD in Condensed Matter Physics in 2013. While studying in the United States, Georgios closely worked with Steven Kivelson, whom he described as a very significant mentor.

Upon returning to Greece in 2014 after his studies, he completed his compulsory military service in the Evzones battalion of the Hellenic Presidential Guard.

In 2021, Athinagoras studied at the Higher Patriarchal Ecclesiastical Academy of Crete.

== Awards ==
In 2009, Georgios received the Kirkpatrick Award for Outstanding Teaching, and in 2013, he received the Fotinos Award.

== Monastic life ==
During his studies in the United States, Georgios contemplated the monastic life. In 2007, he spoke with his spiritual father, Archbishop Makarios (then Bishop Makarios of Christoupolis), who introduced him to the Monastery of St. George in Epanosifis, Greece. On 1 June 2017, he was tonsured a monk and resided at the monastery in Epanosifis. That same year on 3 November, Bishop Makarios ordained him a hierodeacon.

=== Life as a cleric ===
In July 2019, Athinagoras was made the Director of Finance of the Greek Orthodox Archdiocese of Australia. On 27 November 2019, he was elevated to Archdeacon. At an extraordinary meeting of the Holy Synod of the Greek Orthodox Archdiocese of Australia, on 22 August 2025 in Sydney, Australia, two triprosopon ("three-person" in Greek) lists were created for the positions of Regional Bishop of Canberra and Auxiliary Bishop to the Archbishop. Athinagoras was listed on the triprosopon for Regional Bishop of Canberra. The two lists were taken to the Holy Synod of the Ecumenical Patriarchate of Constantinople, which elected Athinagoras as Regional Bishop of Canberra, and Archimandrite Christophoros Krikelis as Auxiliary Bishop to the Archbishop.

Hearing the news of his election, the Higher Patriarchal Ecclesiastical Academy of Crete, where Bishop-elect Athinagoras studied, congratulated him and noted that he "was one of our finest students, distinguished for his consistency, love of learning, high academic performance, and sincere respect for the educational process."

On 26 September 2025, Bishop-elect (Archdeacon) Athinagoras was ordained to the priesthood by Archbishop Makarios of Australia, at the Greek Orthodox Cathedral of the Annunciation in Redfern, New South Wales. Bishop-elect Athinagoras was then ordained to the episcopate the day after, on 27 September 2025.
