= Ezekiel Kefalas =

Eastern Orthodox bishop

His Eminence Metropolitan Ezekiel Kefalas

Orders
- Ordination: July 1962 (Deacon); 30 September 1962 (Priest)
- Consecration: 20 March 1977 (Bishop); 30 August 2021 (Metropolitan)

Personal details
- Born: Ezekiel Kefalas; 25 December 1938 (age 87) Akritas, Kilkis, Macedonia, Greece
- Denomination: Orthodox Christian
- Residence: Melbourne, Australia
- Education: Theological School of Halki

Ezekiel Kefalas (born 25 December 1938) is a retired hierarch of the Ecumenical Patriarchate of Constantinople based in Melbourne, Australia. Kefalas served as an assistant bishop within the Greek Orthodox Archdiocese of Australia from 1977 until his retirement in November, 2021 when he was elevated to the honorary title of Metropolitan of Dervis.

== Overview ==
Kefalas was born in Akritas, Kilkis on 25 December 1938. He studied theology at the Theological School of Halki on the island of Halki and graduated in 1962. He was then ordained a deacon before moving to Australia in September where he was ordained to the priesthood at the parish of Panagia Myrtidiotissa in Dubbo, New South Wales. He briefly served at the parish-community of Saint Gerasimos in Leichhardt, Sydney before being appointed as the founding priest at the large Sydney Parish and Community of All Saints in Belmore where he served until promoted to the episcopate in 1977.

On 1 March 1977 Kefalas was elected by the Synod of the Ecumenical Patriarchate as an assistant Bishop to Archbishop Stylianos of Australia and was given the title Bishop of Dervis and appointed by Archbishop Stylianos as his assistant bishop in Perth. After three years there he spent five years in Adelaide. In 1984, Stylianos appointed Kefalas assistant bishop of the second Archdiocesan district of Victoria and Tasmania, from which he retired in November, 2021.

Following the death of Stylianos on 25 March 2019, Kefalas was briefly the Patriarchal Commissioner of the Archdiocese of Australia until the election of Makarios Griniezakis as Greek Orthodox Archbishop of Australia.

He retired in November 2021 and was elevated by the Synod of the Ecumenical Patriarchate to Metropolitan of Dervis. He lives in Melbourne.

== Awards ==
In 2022 Kefalas received the medal of the Order of the Christ-loving by Archbishop Makarios. This award is the highest distinction of the Archdiocese of Australia and Kefalas was the first hierarch to receive this title.

Eastern Orthodox Church titles
| Preceded by unknown | Archdiocese of Australia - Assistant Bishop in Perth; 1977–1980 | Succeeded by unknown |
| Preceded by Panteleimon of Theoupoleos | Archdiocese of Australia - Assistant Bishop in Adelaide; 1980–1984 | Succeeded by Paul of Christianoupolis |
| Preceded by Panteleimon of Theoupoleos | Archdiocese of Australia - Assistant Bishop in Melbourne; 1984–2021 | Succeeded by Kyriakos of Sozopolis (Melbourne region); Evmenios of Kerasounta (Northcote region, from 2019) |
| Preceded by Stylianos Harkianakis | Archbishop of Australia (caretaker); 25 March 2019 — 9 May 2019 | Succeeded by Makarios Griniezakis |
