= Ecumenical Patriarchate of Constantinople =

Autocephalous church of Eastern Orthodox Christianity

Ecumenical Patriarchate of Constantinople
- Οἰκουμενικὸν Πατριαρχεῖον Κωνσταντινουπόλεως
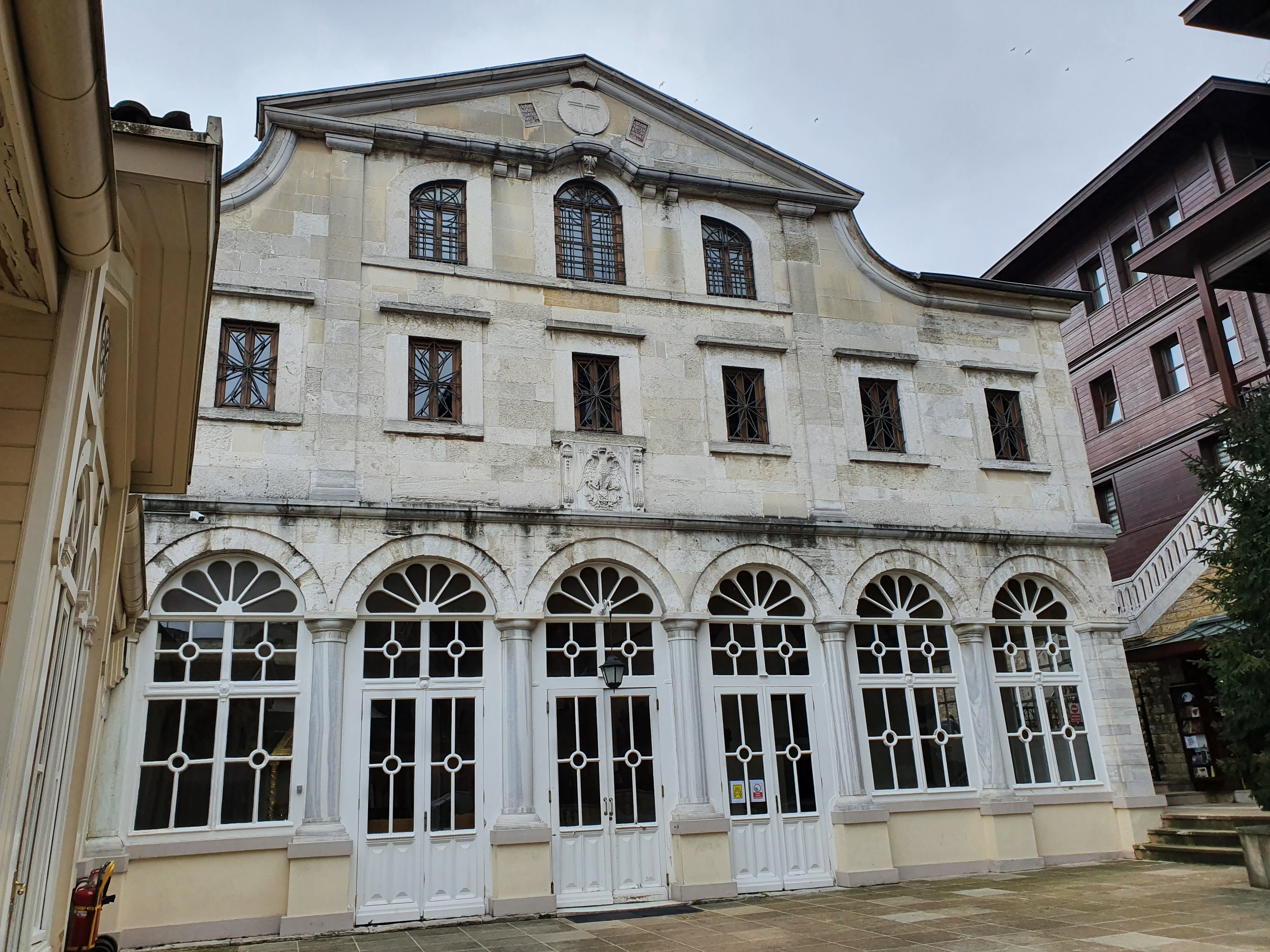
- St. George's Cathedral, Istanbul, headquarters of the Ecumenical Patriarchate of Constantinople
- Type: Autocephaly
- Classification: Christian
- Orientation: Greek Orthodox
- Scripture: Septuagint; New Testament
- Theology: Eastern Orthodox theology
- Polity: Episcopal
- Primate: Bartholomew I of Constantinople
- Bishops: 125 (73 acting, 52 titular)
- Parishes: 525 (in the United States)
- Monastics: ~1,800 (Mount Athos)
- Monasteries: 20 (United States), 20 (Mount Athos), 8 (Australia), 6 (Meteora), 2 (Korea), 1 (United Kingdom)
- Language: English, Greek (Liturgical), Korean, Russian, Turkish, Ukrainian and other vernacular
- Liturgy: Byzantine Rite
- Headquarters: Hagia Sophia, Constantinople (537–1453); Church of the Holy Apostles (1453–1456); Pammakaristos Church (1456–1588); Church of the Panagia Paramythia (1589–1597); Church of St. Demetrius Xyloportas (1598–1600); St. George's Cathedral, Istanbul (1601–present); 41°01′45″N 28°57′06″E
- Territory: Current: Turkey (Eastern Thrace and Anatolia), parts of Greece (Crete, the Dodecanese, and parts of Northern Greece, including Mount Athos), and Greek Orthodox jurisdictions in the diaspora; Historical: the rest of Greece, Eastern Slavic countries, Romania, Serbia, Albania, Bulgaria, western Georgia (Egrisi), parts of Southern Italy, and other territories formerly under the jurisdiction of the Ecumenical Patriarchate of Constantinople
- Independence: 330 AD from the Metropolis of Heraclea
- Separations: several, see list below
- Members: 5,255,000
- Official website: ec-patr.org

The Ecumenical Patriarchate of Constantinople (Greek: Οἰκουμενικὸν Πατριαρχεῖον Κωνσταντινουπόλεως, romanized: Oikoumenikón Patriarkhíon Konstantinoupóleos) (Note: IPA: [ikumeniˈkon patriarˈçion konstandinuˈpoleos]; Latin: Patriarchatus Oecumenicus Constantinopolitanus; Turkish: Rum Ortodoks Patrikhanesi, İstanbul Ekümenik Patrikhanesi, "Roman Orthodox Patriarchate, Ecumenical Patriarchate of Istanbul")) is one of the autocephalous churches of the Eastern Orthodox Church. It is headed by the Ecumenical Patriarch of Constantinople.

Because of its historical location as the capital of the former Eastern Roman Empire, as well as its role as the mother church of most modern Eastern Orthodox churches, Constantinople holds a special place of honor within Eastern Orthodox Christianity. The see serves as the seat for the Ecumenical Patriarch, who holds the status of primus inter pares (first among equals) among the world's Eastern Orthodox primates, and is regarded as the representative and spiritual leader of Eastern Orthodox Christians. The Phanar (Turkish: Fener), the name of the neighborhood where the Ecumenical Patriarch resides, is often used as a metonym for the Ecumenical Patriarchate of Constantinople. (Note: Compare "the Vatican" for the Holy See of the Catholic Church, or "the Sublime Porte" for the Ottoman government.)

The Ecumenical Patriarchate of Constantinople promotes the expansion of the Christian faith and Eastern Orthodox doctrine. The historical primates of the Church have often been seen involved in ecumenism and interfaith dialogue, charitable work, and the defense of Orthodox Christian traditions. Prominent issues for the Ecumenical Patriarchate's policy in the 21st century include the safety of the believers in the Middle East, reconciliation of the Eastern Orthodox and Catholic churches, and the reopening of the Theological School of Halki, which was closed by Turkish authorities in 1971.

== History ==
=== The Great Church of Christ ===
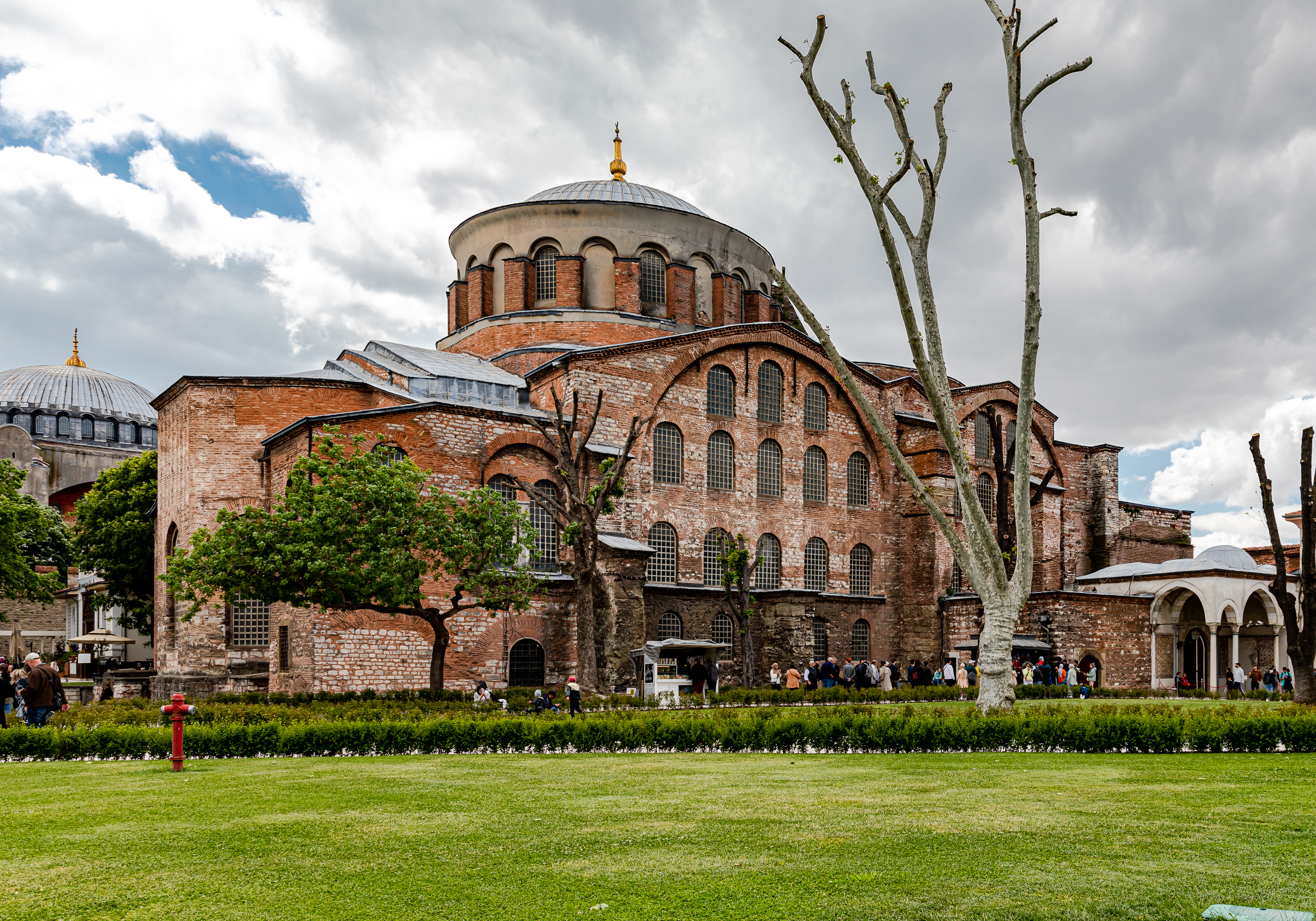
The Church of Hagia Irene was the cathedral church of the Patriarchate before Hagia Sophia was completed in 360.

In 330 AD, the Roman Emperor Constantine the Great moved his residence to the city, renaming it Nova Roma (Νέα Ῥώμη), or "New Rome". Thereafter, the importance of the Church there grew, along with the influence of its bishop. Prior to the re-establishment of the imperial capital, the bishop of Byzantium had been under the authority of the Metropolitan of Heraclea, but from the 4th century onwards, he grew to become independent in his own right, exercising authority throughout what is now Greece, Asia Minor, Pontus, and Thrace. With the development of the hierarchical structure of the Church, the Bishop of Constantinople came to be styled as Exarch (a position superior to Metropolitan). At the First Council of Constantinople in 381 AD, Constantinople was recognized as the fourth ancient Eastern Orthodox patriarchate, after Antioch, Alexandria, and Rome. The Primate (the Ecumenical Patriarch) was usually appointed by Antioch.

Because of the importance of the position of Constantinople's church, at the center of the Roman Empire, affairs involving the various churches outside Constantinople's direct authority came to be discussed in the capital, particularly where the intervention of the emperor was desired. The Patriarch naturally became a liaison between the emperor and bishops traveling to the capital, thus establishing his position as one involving the unity of the whole Church, especially in the East.

In turn, the affairs of the Constantinopolitan church were overseen not just by the Patriarch, but also by synods which included visiting bishops. This pan-Orthodox synod came to be referred to as the ἐνδημοῦσα σύνοδος (endemousa synodos, "resident synod"). The resident synod not only governed the business of the Patriarchate, but also examined questions pertinent to the whole Church, as well as the eastern half of the former empire. The Patriarch thus came to have the prefixed title of Ecumenical, which referenced not a universal episcopacy over other bishops, but rather the position of the Patriarch at the center of the oikoumeni, the "household" of the empire.

As the Roman Empire stabilized and grew, so did the influence of the Patriarchate at its capital. This influence came to be enshrined in Orthodox canon law, to such an extent that it was elevated even beyond its older counterpart ancient patriarchates. Canon 3 of the First Council of Constantinople (381) stated that the bishop of that city "shall have primacy of honor after the Bishop of Rome because Constantinople is the New Rome."

Hagia Sophia was the patriarchal cathedral until 1453.

In the Council of Chalcedon in 451, Canon 28 granted the Church of Constantinople equal privileges (isa presbeia) with the Church of Rome. It also placed the dioceses of Pontus, Asia, and Thrace under its jurisdiction. Canons 9 and 17 granted Constantinople the right to hear appeals involving clergy from other ecclesiastical jurisdictions.

For almost a thousand years, the Patriarch of Constantinople presided over the church in the Eastern Roman (Byzantine) Empire and oversaw its missionary activity, which brought the Byzantine Christian rite to many north of the imperial borders. The Cathedral of the city, Hagia Sophia, served as the center of religious life in the Eastern Christian world.

The Ecumenical Patriarchate came to be called the "Great Church of Christ," acting as the touchstone and reference point for ecclesiastical affairs in the East, whether in terms of Church governance, relations with the state, or liturgical matters.

==== Prerogatives of the Ecumenical Patriarchate ====
In history and in canonical literature (i.e. the Church's canons and related traditional commentaries), the Ecumenical Patriarchate has been granted certain prerogatives (πρεσβεία, presveía) that other autocephalous Orthodox churches do not have. Not all of these prerogatives are today universally acknowledged, though all do have precedents in history and canonical references. The following is a (non-exhaustive) list of these prerogatives and their reference points:

- Equal prerogatives to Old Rome (Canon 28 of the Fourth Ecumenical Council, Canon 36 of the Quinisext Council);
- The right to hear appeals, if invited, regarding disputes between clergy (Canons 9 and 17 of the Fourth Ecumenical Council);
- The right to ordain bishops for areas outside defined canonical boundaries (Canon 28 of the Fourth Ecumenical Council);
- The right to establish stavropegial monasteries even in the territories of other Patriarchates (the Epanagoge, commentaries of Matthew Blastares and Theodore Balsamon)

=== Iconoclast controversy ===
In the eighth and ninth centuries, the iconoclast movement caused serious political unrest throughout the Empire. The emperor Leo III issued a decree in 726 against images, and ordered the destruction of an image of Christ over one of the doors of the Chalke, an act which was fiercely resisted by the citizens. Constantine V convened a church council in 754, which condemned the worship of image; after which many treasures were broken, burned, or painted over with depictions of trees, birds or animals. One source refers to the church of the Holy Virgin at Blachernae as having been transformed into a "fruit store and aviary". Following the death of his son Leo IV in 780, the succeeding Empress Irene restored the veneration of images through the Second Council of Nicaea in 787.

The iconoclast controversy returned in the early 9th century, only to be resolved once more in 843 during the regency of Empress Theodora, who restored the icons.

=== Christianization of the Slavs ===
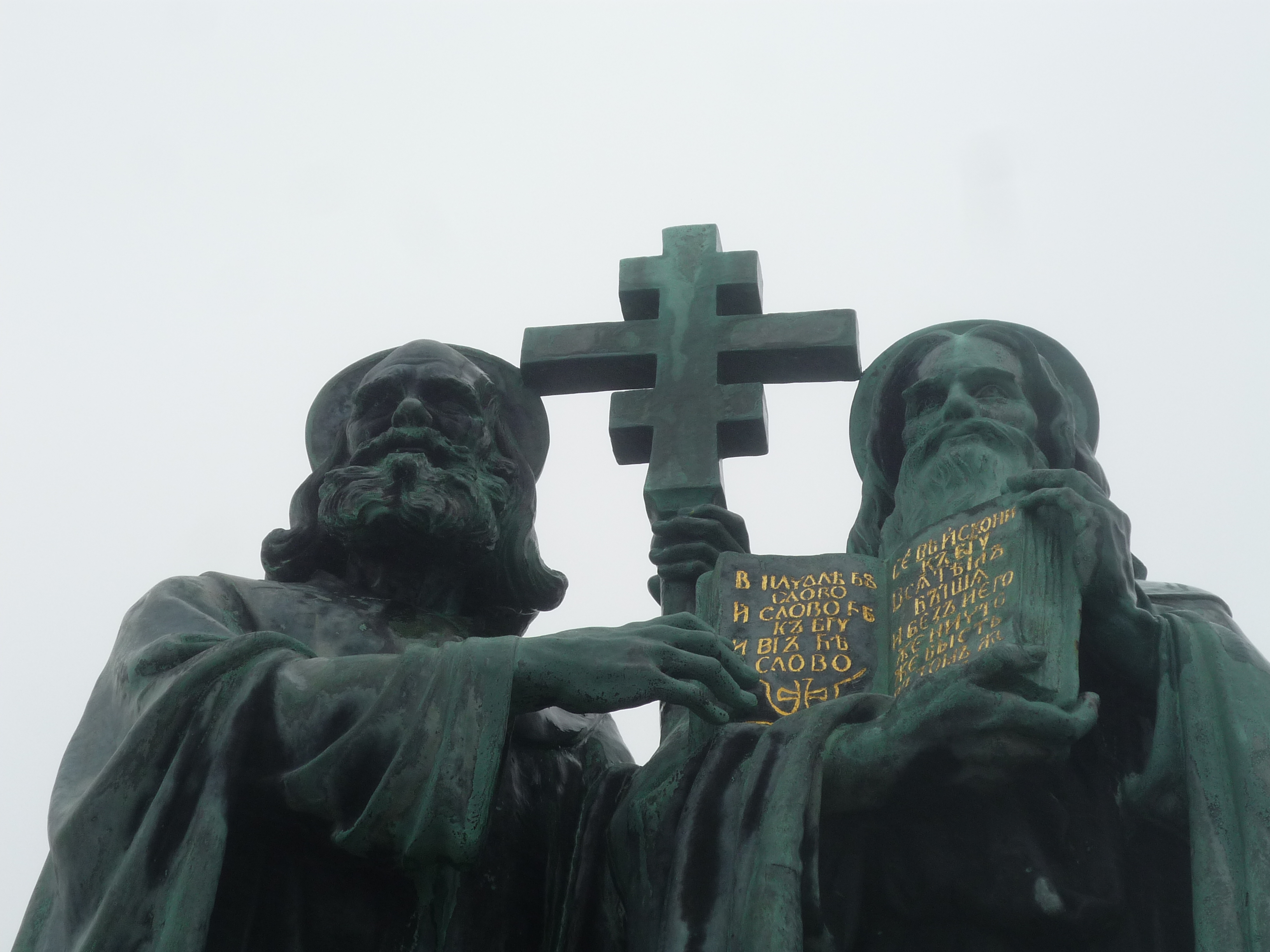
Monument to St. Cyril and St. Methodius, Byzantine missionaries to the Slavs

The Ecumenical Patriarchate of Constantinople played a central role in the Christianization of the Slavic peoples during the Early Middle Ages, particularly in the 9th to the 11th century. This activity was closely connected to the wider Byzantine policy of cultural and religious influence in Eastern Europe, often referred to by modern historians as the expansion of the Byzantine commonwealth.

One of the earliest and most significant stages of this process was the mission to Great Moravia, undertaken in the 860s by Saints Cyril and Methodius. Acting under the approval of the Patriarchate of Constantinople, they developed the Glagolitic script and translated key liturgical texts into Old Church Slavonic. This innovation allowed Christian worship to be conducted in a language understood by Slavic populations, significantly facilitating the spread of Christianity among the Slavs.

Following the mission to Great Moravia, the Christianization of the First Bulgarian Empire marked a major expansion of Orthodox Christianity in the Balkans. In 864, under Knyaz Boris I, Bulgaria accepted Christianity, and in 870, the Bulgarian Church was granted autonomous status under the jurisdiction of the Ecumenical Patriarchate. This development laid the foundation for the emergence of a distinct Slavic Christian tradition within Eastern Orthodoxy.

The Christianization of Kievan Rus' is traditionally dated to 988, when Grand Prince Vladimir the Great was baptized in Chersonesus, subsequently ordering the mass baptism of the people of Kiev. This event firmly integrated Kievan Rus’ into the Byzantine ecclesiastical sphere under the authority of the Patriarchate of Constantinople, which appointed the Metropolitans of Kiev for several centuries thereafter.

In the Western Balkans, the Christianization of the Serbs also developed under Byzantine ecclesiastical influence. The establishment of the autocephalous Serbian Orthodox Church in 1219 by Saint Sava received recognition from Constantinople, reflecting both the spread of Orthodox Christianity and the gradual decentralization of ecclesiastical authority in the region.

=== Great Schism of 1054 ===
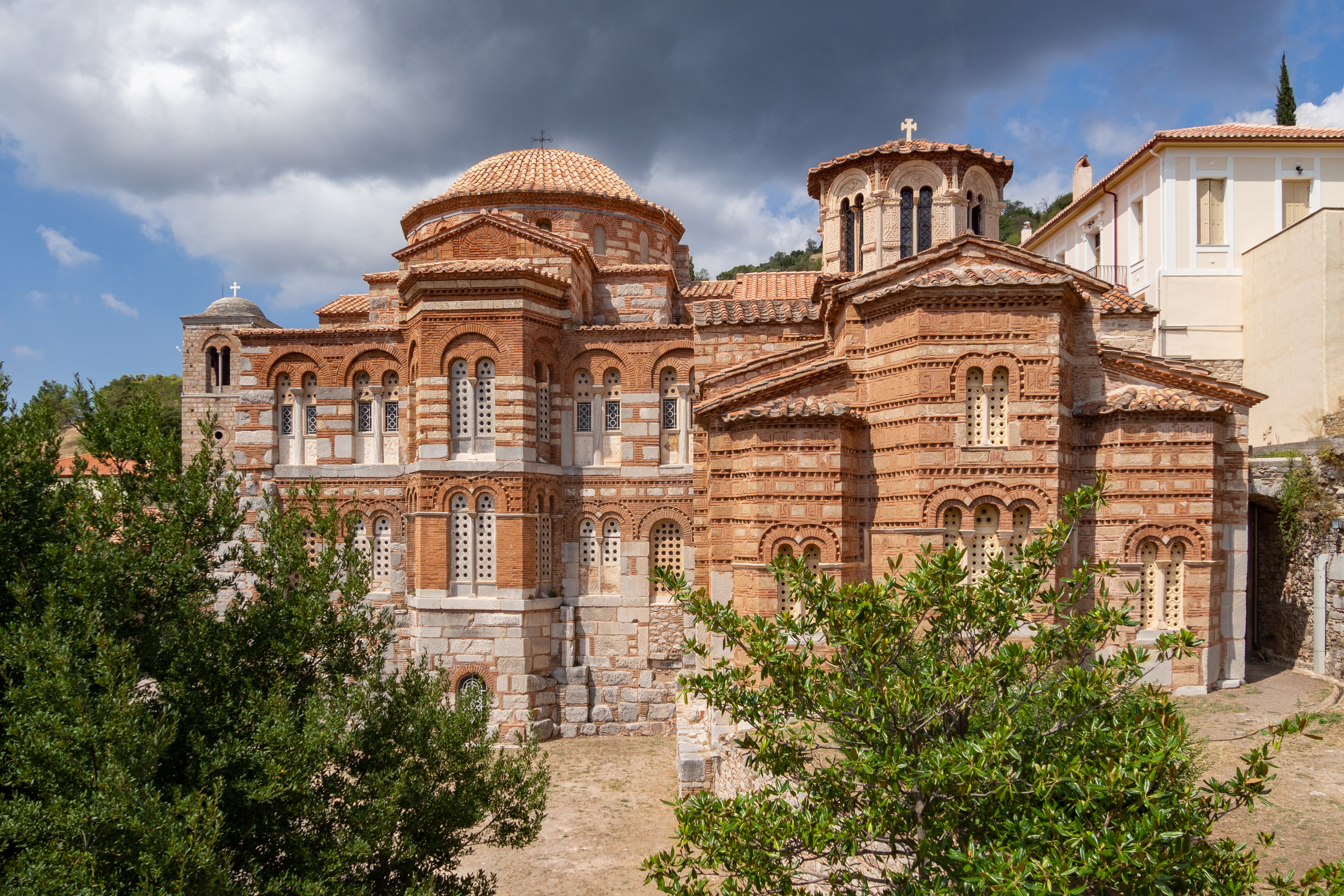
Hosios Loukas, from the mid-10th century, is one of the most important monuments of Middle Byzantine architecture and Byzantine art.

The relations between the papacy and the Byzantine court were generally cordial in the years leading up to 1054. The emperor Constantine IX and Pope Leo IX maintained alliances through the mediation of the Lombard catepan of Italy, Argyrus, who had spent years in Constantinople, originally as a political prisoner.

In 1053, Patriarch Michael I Cerularius ordered a letter to be written to John, Bishop of Trani, in which he strongly criticized what he viewed as "Judaistic" practices of the Western Church, specifically the use of unleavened bread in the Eucharist. In addition, the letter addressed other theological and cultural issues, particularly questioning the supremacy claimed by the Pope in Rome, and criticizing the addition of the Filioque clause to the Nicene Creed by the Western Church. John sent the letter to all Western bishops, including the Pope. It was translated into Latin by Humbert of Mourmoutiers, the Cardinal-bishop of Silva Candida, who delivered the letter to the Pope. A formal response was prepared and later sent, addressing each accusation and defending papal supremacy.

Although Michael attempted to moderate the debate and prevent escalation, Humbert of Mourmoutiers and the papal representatives made no concessions, and traveled with legatine authority to Constantinople to resolve the questions. Humbert, Frederick of Lorraine, and Peter, Archbishop of Amalfi, arrived in April 1054 and were met with a hostile reception; they left their written response with Michael, who refused to recognize their authority. When Pope Leo IX died on April 19, 1054, the legates’ authority technically ended, yet they continued their mission. In response to Michael's refusal to address the concerns, the legates entered the Hagia Sophia during the Divine Liturgy, and placed a bull of excommunication on the altar.

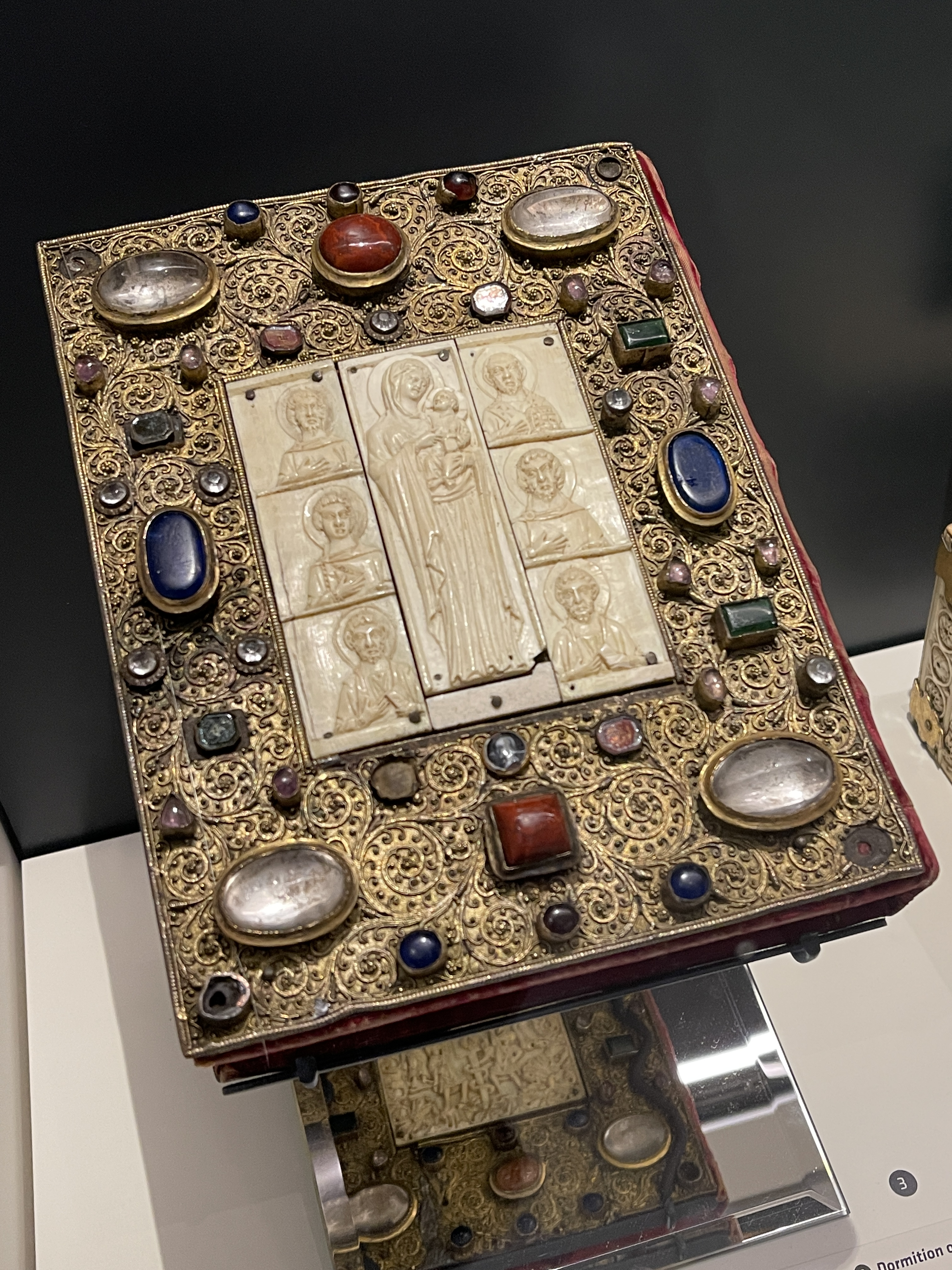
A Byzantine Gospel of the 13th century, it shows the increasing trend towards the use of Ivory as an artistic tool.

The events of 1054 are generally cited as the beginning of the East–West Schism. The bull only excommunicated Cerularius, Leo of Achrida, and their adherents. However, the schism developed gradually as other Eastern patriarchs aligned with Michael, influenced in part by Emperor Michael VI Stratiotikos. Some have questioned the legal authority of the bull, as Pope Leo IX had died before its issuance. The legates departed for Rome shortly after issuing the bull, leaving Constantinople in near-riot conditions. The Patriarch retained popular support, and to assuage anger, the bull was burned. In turn, only the Latin legates were anathematised, with no indication of excommunicating the entire Western Church.

Among the reasons cited in the bull was the alleged deletion of the Filioque clause from the Nicene Creed by the Eastern Church. In fact, the Eastern Church had not deleted anything; it was the Western Church that had added this phrase. The issue of the Filioque and papal supremacy were central to the disagreements highlighted by Michael I, and remain key points in understanding the theological and institutional tensions between East and West. As Bishop Kallistos Ware writes, "...even after 1054 friendly relations between East and West continued. The two parts of Christendom were not yet conscious of a great gulf of separation between them. … The dispute remained something of which ordinary Christians in East and West were largely unaware."

Subsequent Popes and Patriarchs attempted reconciliation, though historical and political factors gradually widened the separation.

=== Fall of Constantinople in 1204 and the exile in Nicaea ===
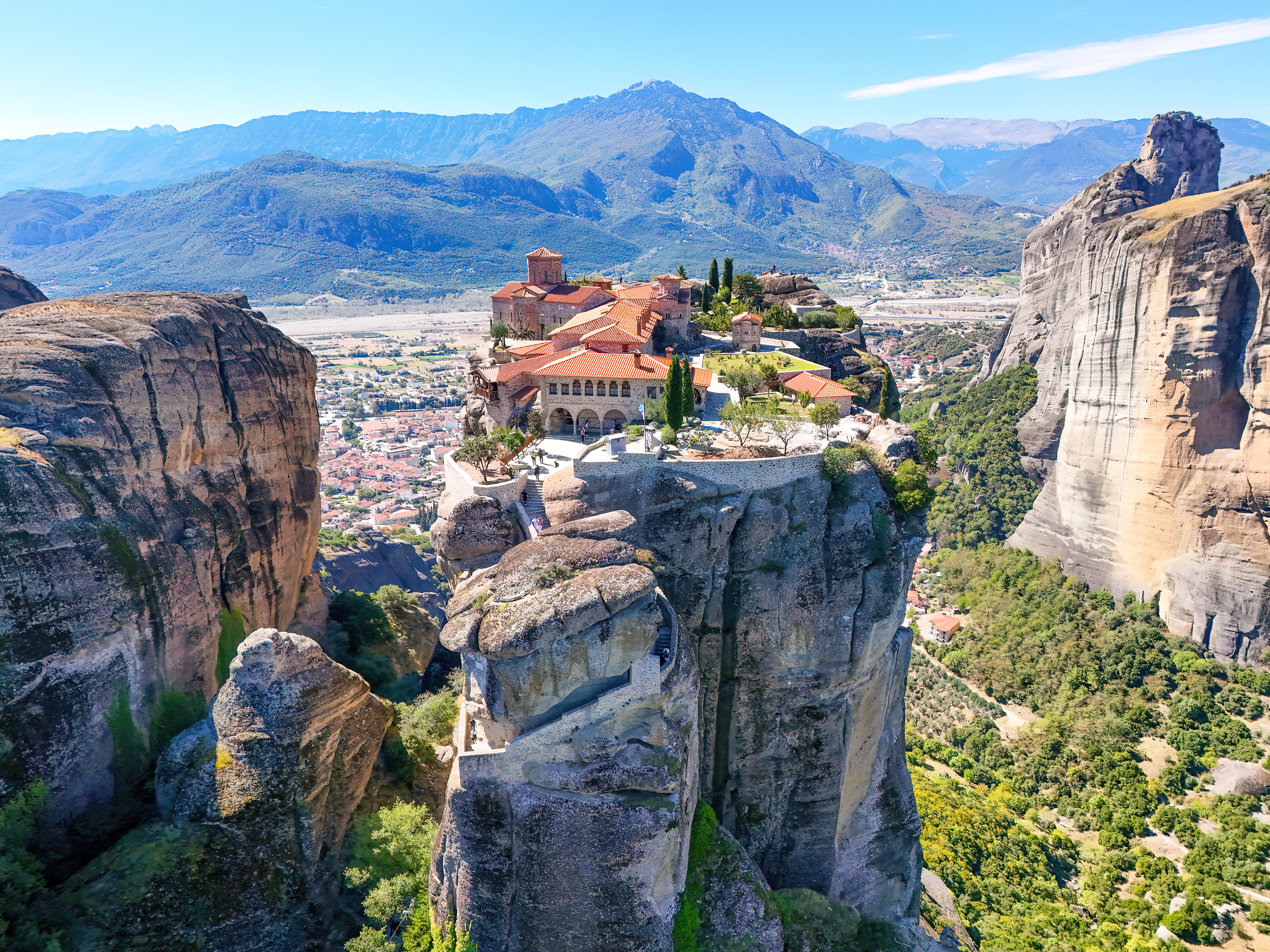
Monastery of the Holy Trinity in Greece

In exchange for promised funds, the Fourth Crusade attempted to help the deposed emperor Alexius IV regain his throne. After taking Constantinople, returning Alexius IV to the throne, the revolt against, and murder of Alexius IV left the Crusaders without payment. On 12 April 1204, the crusaders inflicted a severe sacking on Constantinople for three days, during which many ancient and medieval Roman and Greek works were either stolen or destroyed. Despite their oaths and the threat of excommunication, the Crusaders ruthlessly and systematically violated the city's holy sanctuaries, destroying, defiling, or stealing all they could lay hands on; nothing was spared. It was said that the total amount looted from Constantinople was about 900,000 silver marks. The Venetians received their due of 150,000 silver marks, while the Crusaders received 50,000 silver marks. A further 100,000 silver marks were later divided evenly up between the Crusaders and Venetians. The remaining 500,000 silver marks were secretly kept back by many Crusader knights.

Niketas Choniates gives a vivid account of the sack of Constantinople, undertaken by the Frankish and Venetian Crusaders of the Fourth Crusade:

The Latin soldiery subjected the greatest city in Europe to an indescribable sack. For three days they murdered, raped, looted and destroyed on a scale which even the ancient Vandals and Goths would have found unbelievable. Constantinople had become a veritable museum of ancient and Byzantine art, an emporium of such incredible wealth that the Latins were astounded at the riches they found. Though the Venetians had an appreciation for the art which they discovered (they were themselves semi-Byzantines) and saved much of it, the French and others destroyed indiscriminately, halting to refresh themselves with wine, violation of nuns, and murder of Orthodox clerics. The Crusaders vented their hatred for the Greeks most spectacularly in the desecration of the greatest Church in Christendom. They smashed the silver iconostasis, the icons and the holy books of Hagia Sophia, and seated upon the patriarchal throne a whore who sang coarse songs as they drank wine from the Church's holy vessels. The estrangement of East and West, which had proceeded over the centuries, culminated in the horrible massacre that accompanied the conquest of Constantinople. The Greeks were convinced that even the Turks, had they taken the city, would not have been as cruel as the Latin Christians. The defeat of Byzantium, already in a state of decline, accelerated political degeneration so that the Byzantines eventually became an easy prey to the Turks. The Crusading movement thus resulted, ultimately, in the victory of Islam, a result which was of course the exact opposite of its original intention.

Meanwhile, the Latin Empire of Constantinople was established, and Byzantine refugees founded their own successor states, the most notable of these being the Empire of Nicaea under Theodore Lascaris (a relative of Alexius III), the Empire of Trebizond, and the Despotate of Epirus.

The new seat of the Patriarchate was established in the city of Nicaea until 1261, when Constantinople was reconquered by the Byzantine Emperor Michael VIII Palaiologos.

=== Fall of Constantinople in 1453 and Ottoman period ===
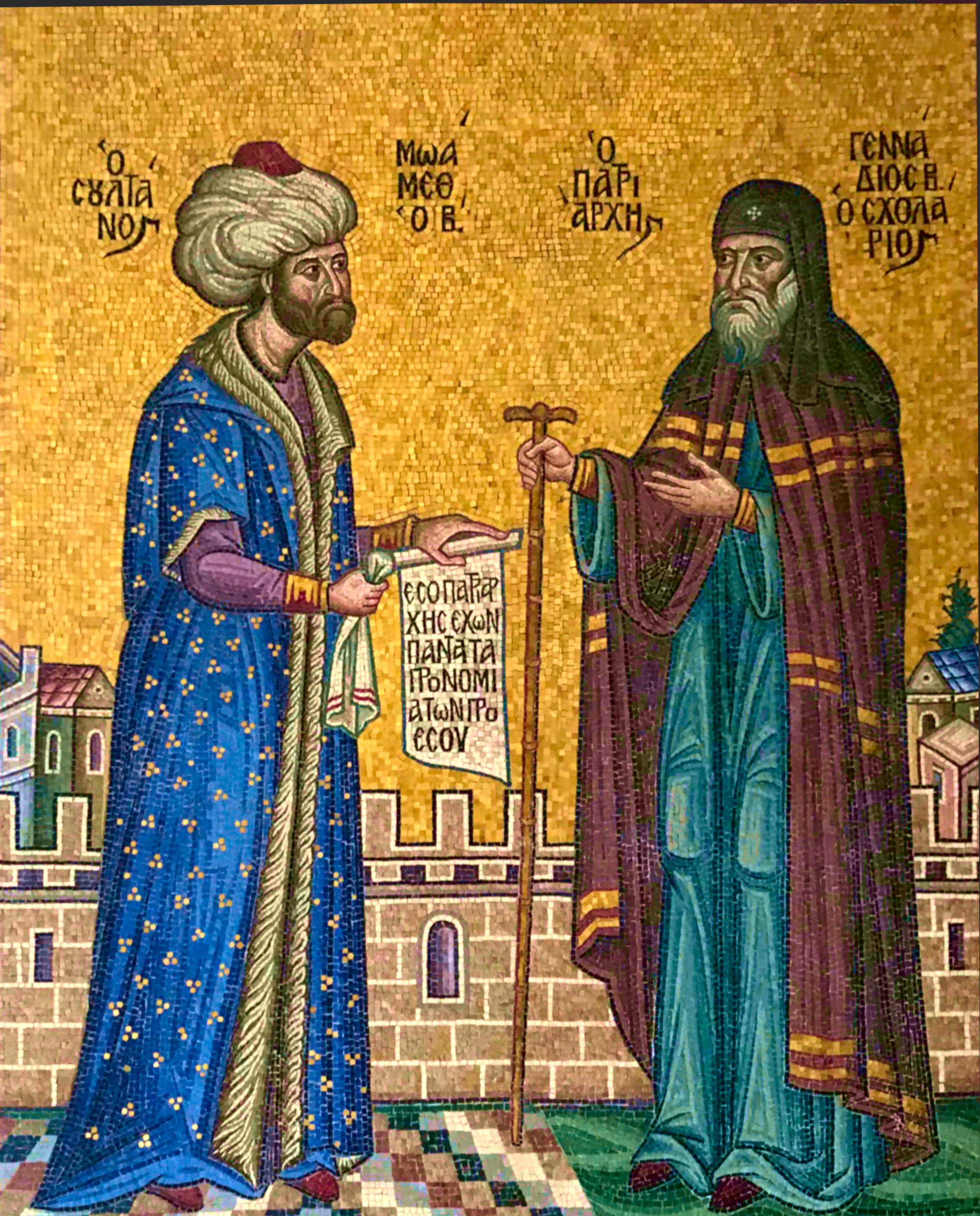
Patriarch Gennadius II of Constantinople with Sultan Mehmed II

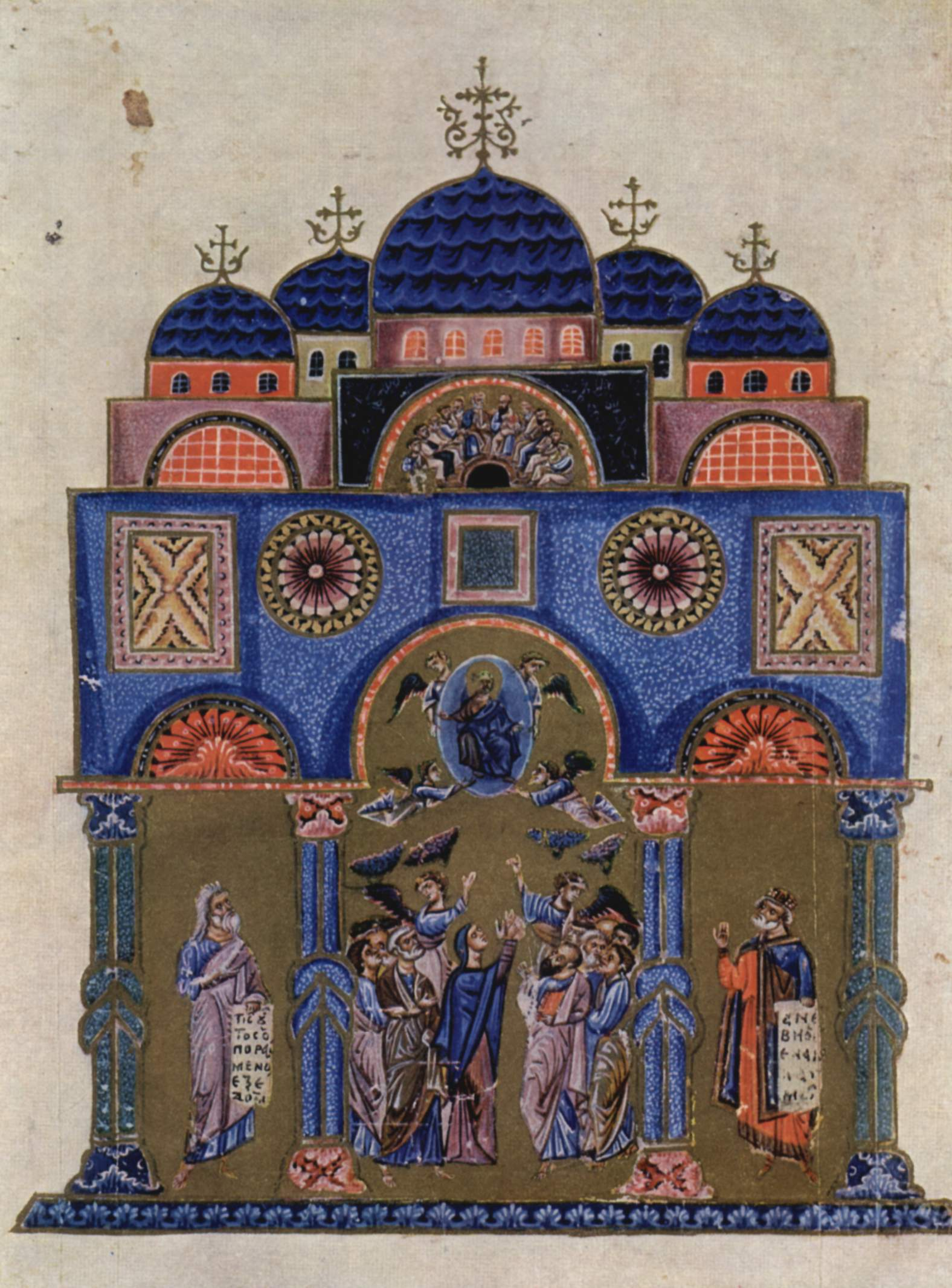
An image from the Vatican Codex of 1162, believed to be a representation of the Church of the Holy Apostles, the first seat of the Patriarchate in the Ottoman age

In accordance with the traditional custom at the time, Sultan Mehmed II allowed his troops and his entourage three full days of unbridled pillage and looting in the city shortly after it was captured. Once the three days passed, he would then claim its remaining contents for himself. However, by the end of the first day, he proclaimed that the looting should cease, as he felt profound sadness when he toured the looted and enslaved city. Hagia Sophia was not exempted from the pillage and looting, specifically becoming its focal point as the invaders believed it to contain the greatest treasures and valuables of the city. Shortly after the defence of the Walls of Constantinople collapsed, and the Ottoman troops entered the city victoriously, as pillagers and looters made their way to the Hagia Sophia, battering down its doors before storming in.

Throughout the period of the siege of Constantinople, the trapped worshippers of the city participated in the Divine Liturgy and vigil prayers at the Hagia Sophia. The church formed a safe-haven and refuge for many of those who were unable to contribute to the city's defence, including women, children, the elderly, the sick and the wounded. Being trapped in the church, the many congregants and yet more refugees inside became spoils-of-war to be divided amongst the triumphant invaders. The building was desecrated and looted, with the helpless occupants who sought shelter within the church being enslaved. Most of the elderly and the wounded and sick were killed, and the remainder (mainly teenage males and young boys) were chained up and sold into slavery.

The women of Constantinople also suffered from rape at the hands of Ottoman forces. According to Barbaro, "all through the day the Turks made a great slaughter of Christians through the city". According to historian Philip Mansel, widespread persecution of the city's civilian inhabitants took place, resulting in thousands of murders and rapes, and 30,000 civilians being enslaved or forcibly deported. George Sphrantzes says that people of both genders were raped inside Hagia Sophia.

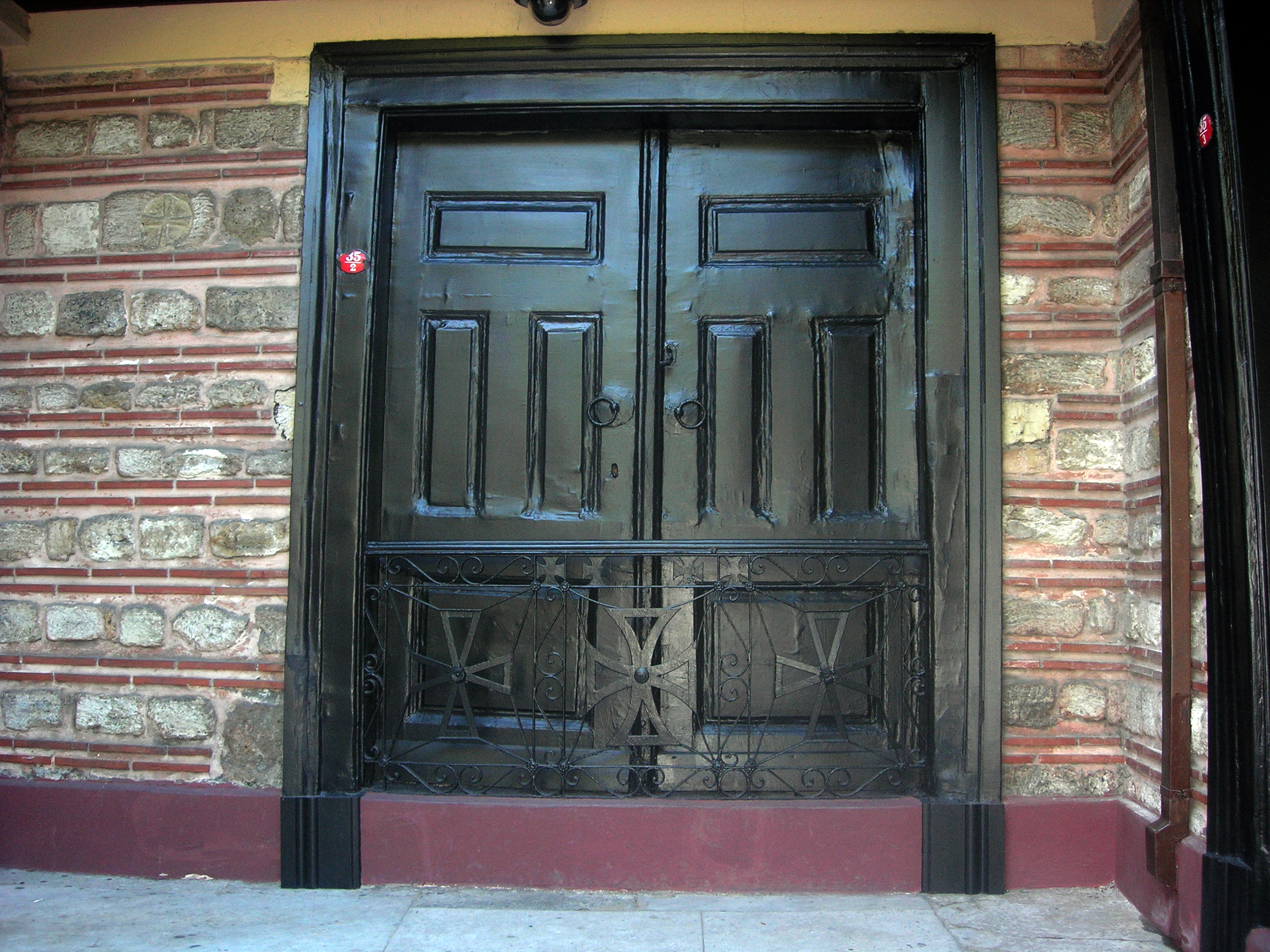
Saint Peter's Gate at the Patriarchate. In 1821, Patriarch Gregory V of Constantinople remained hanged in full robes for three days at its architrave, because he was blamed by Mahmud II for his inability to suppress the Greek War of Independence. The Gate has not been opened since.

After Constantinople was overrun by the Ottoman Turks in 1453, the Patriarchate came to care more directly for the Orthodox living within the Ottoman Empire. Mehmed II appointed Gennadius II of Constantinople as the Patriarch in 1454, and designated him as the spiritual leader and ethnarch (Turkish: millet) of all the Orthodox Christians in the Empire, regardless of ethnic origin; not only Greeks, but also Bulgarians, Serbs, Albanians, Wallachians, Moldavians, Croats, Syrians, Arabs, Georgians and Lazs came under the spiritual, administrative, fiscal, cultural and legal jurisdiction of the Patriarchate. Some of the other Orthodox Patriarchs came at various points to live permanently in Constantinople and function as part of the local Church government. This situation, according to some of the Orientalists and historians, shows the Pax Ottomana (or Pax Ottomanica, literally "the Ottoman Peace").

The Russian Orthodox Church, which for centuries had been a diocese of the Ecumenical Patriarchate, declared its independence in 1448 shortly before Constantinople fell owing to its protest over the Council of Florence, in which representatives of the Patriarchate had signed for union with Rome, trading doctrinal concessions for military aid against the encroaching Ottomans. The military aid never came, and those concessions were subsequently repudiated by the Patriarchate, but, from 1448, the Russian church came to function independently as a council of Russian bishops elected their own Metropolitan. After the fall of Constantinople to Mehmed II on 29 May 1453, Moscow became the only independent Orthodox power. In 1589, 141 years later, Constantinople came to recognize Russia's independence and led the Eastern Orthodox Church in declaring Russia also to be a Patriarchate, numbering Moscow's bishop as fifth in rank behind the ancient patriarchates. The Patriarchate's foundation charter explicitly advances the claim that Moscow was the successor to the Byzantine Empire, calling it the "third Rome". The Russian Orthodox Church became the largest of the Eastern Orthodox churches in the world.

As Ottoman rule weakened, various parts of the Orthodox Church that had been under the direct influence of the Ecumenical Patriarchate came to be independent. These churches at first usually declared their independence without universal approval, which came after Constantinople gave its blessing. The rate at which these new autocephalous ("self-headed") churches significantly increased in the 19th century, particularly with the independence of Greece.

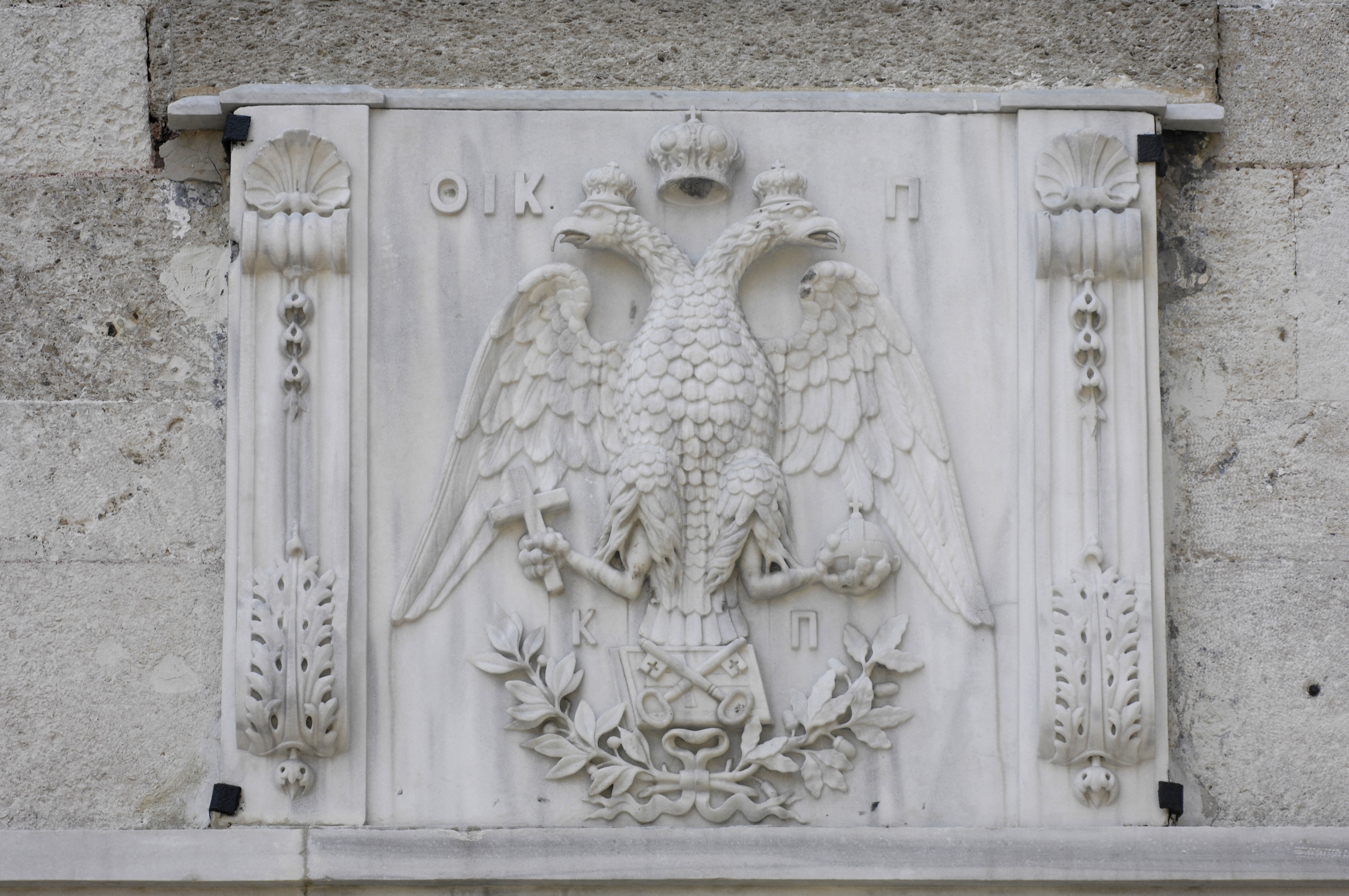
Coat of arms of the Ecumenical Patriarchate of Constantinople, above the entrance to the Patriarchal Cathedral of St. George

In 1833, the Church of Greece declared its autocephaly, which was subsequently recognized by the Patriarchate in 1850. In 1865, the Romanian Orthodox Church, against the protests of Constantinople, declared its independence, which was acknowledged 20 years later. A year before Greece's autocephaly was self-proclaimed, the Serbian Orthodox Church was named autocephalous by the local secular government, but Constantinople refused recognition until 1879. In 1860 the Bulgarians de facto seceded from the Ecumenical Patriarchate. In 1870 the Bulgarian church was politically recognized as autonomous under the name Bulgarian Exarchate by the Sultan's firman, but it was not until 1945 that it was recognized by the Ecumenical Patriarchate. In 1922, the Albanian Orthodox Church declared its autocephaly, being granted recognition in 1937.

In addition to these churches, whose territory had been agreed upon by all as within Constantinople's jurisdiction, several other disputed areas' Eastern Orthodox churches have had recognition by the Ecumenical Patriarchate as either autocephalous or autonomous, including the Finnish Orthodox Church and Estonian Orthodox Church in 1923, the Polish Orthodox Church in 1924, and the Czech and Slovak Orthodox Church in 1998. The majority of these disputes are a result of the expansion of the Russian Empire, which often included a subjugation of the Orthodox churches in conquered lands to the Moscow Patriarchate. Due to this, the Moscow Patriarchate often disputes the Ecumenical Patriarch's role as prime representative and spiritual leader of the world's Orthodox Christians, citing that it represents the numerically largest Orthodox community.

==== Ecclesiastical buildings in Ottoman cities ====
As a ruling institution, the Ottoman Empire brought regulations on how the cities would be built (quality reassurances) and how the architecture (structural integrity, social needs, etc.) should be shaped. Special restrictions were imposed concerning the construction, renovation, size and usage of bells in churches. For example, in a town, a church should not be larger in size than the largest mosque. Many churches were converted into mosques (among them the Hagia Sophia and Chora Church in Constantinople, and the Rotunda and Hagios Demetrios in Thessaloniki) or served for other uses (e.g. Hagia Irene in Constantinople, which became an armory for the Janissaries, and the Gül Mosque [Hagia Theodosia or Christ Euergetes], also in Constantinople, which served for a while as a naval dockyard after the Conquest). With time, such rules, despite being very strict in the beginning, were increasingly disregarded. This led to a veritable building boom of Orthodox churches in 19th century Istanbul, many among them having high bell towers and brick domes, both of which had previously been strictly prohibited.

=== Patriarchate under the secular Republic of Turkey ===
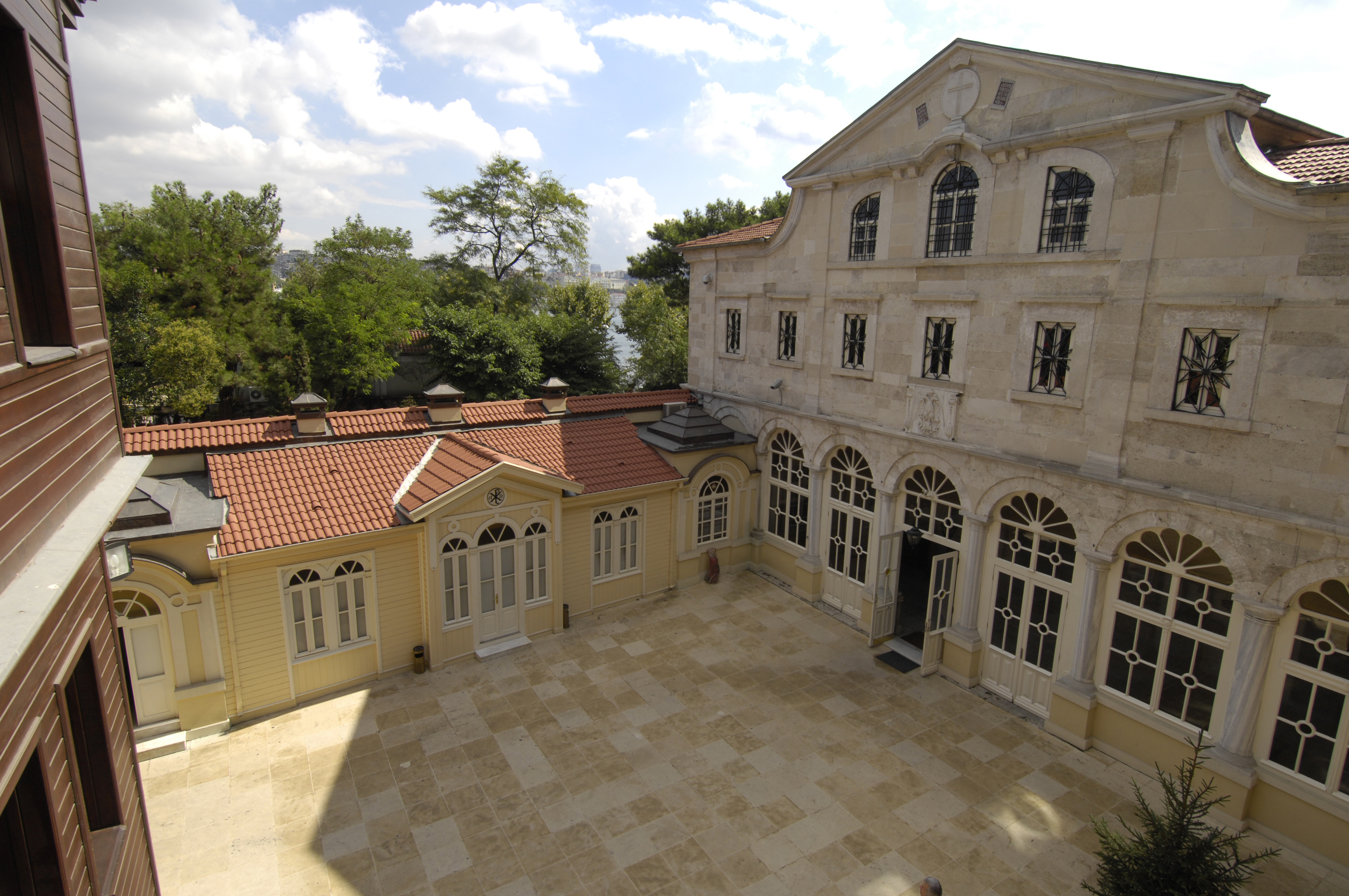
The exterior of the Patriarchal Basilica of St. George, located in the Fener district of Istanbul. The facade dates from the mid-19th century and shows a neoclassical influence.

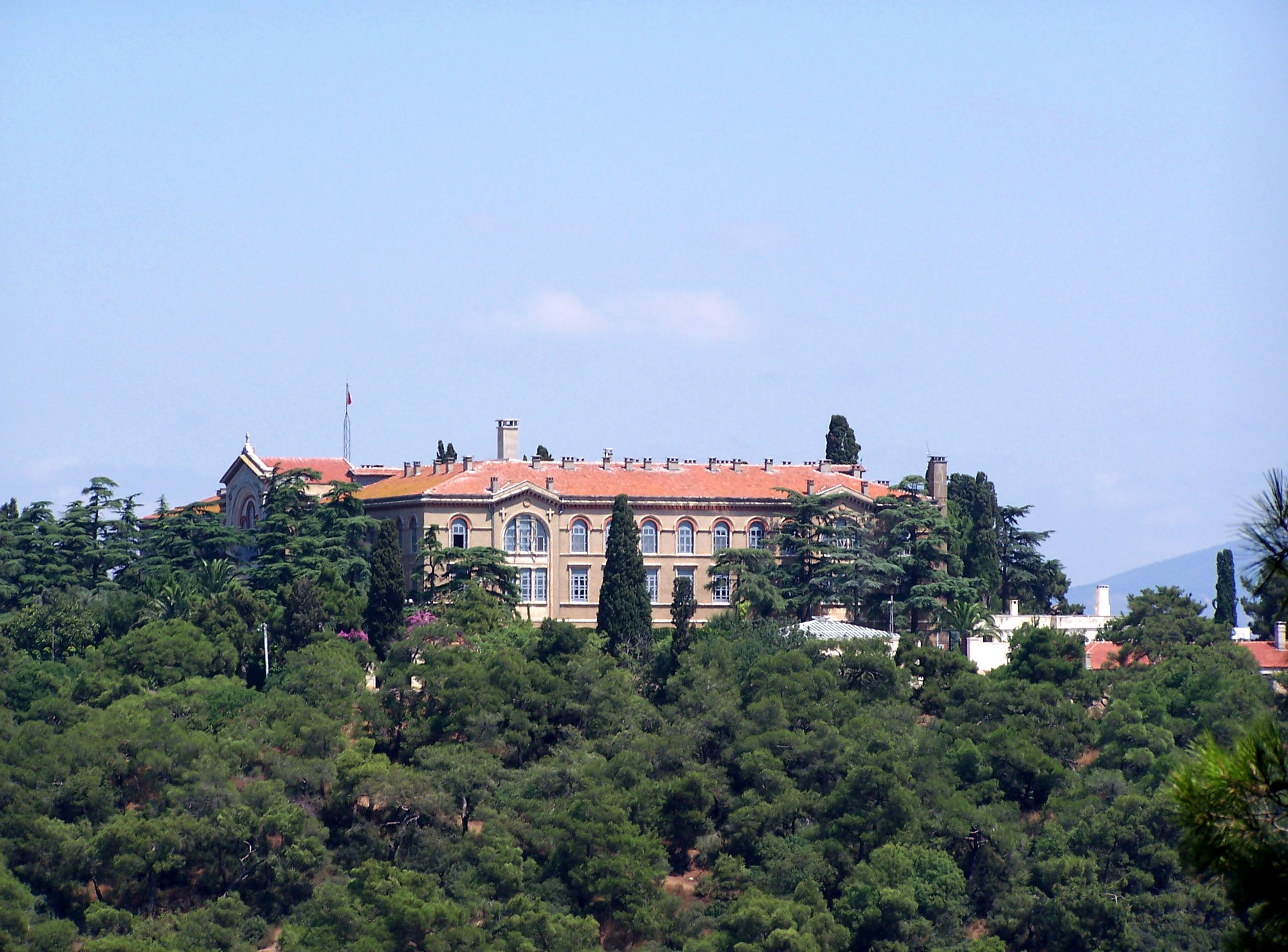
The Theological School of Halki at the top of the Hill of Hope

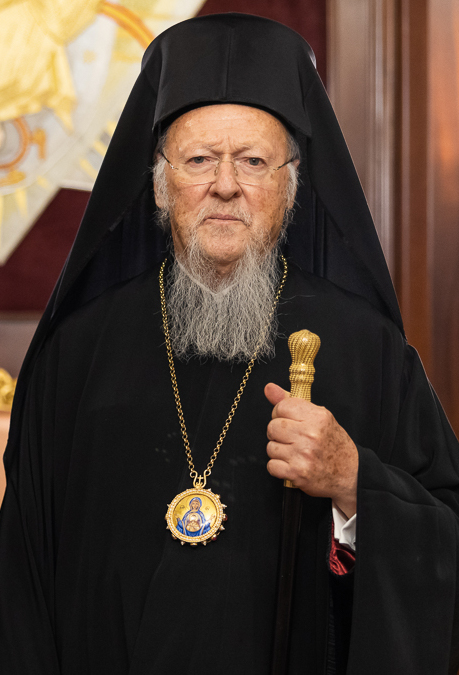
The current Ecumenical Patriarch, Bartholomew I

Since 1586 the Ecumenical Patriarchate has operated its headquarters in the Church of St George in the Fener (Phanar) district of Istanbul. The current territory of the Patriarchate is significantly reduced from its equivalent during the early Ottoman period, when its authority extended over much of the Orthodox population of the Empire. Its canonical territory currently includes most of modern Turkey, northern Greece, Mount Athos, the Dodecanese and Crete.

By its interpretation of Canon 28 of Chalcedon, Constantinople also claims jurisdiction over all areas outside the canonically defined territories of other Orthodox churches, which includes the entire Western Hemisphere, Oceania, the United Kingdom, Western Europe, Northeast Asia, and Southeast Asia. This claim is disputed by other autocephalous churches with dioceses in those areas, as well as the Turkish government.

The Orthodox presence in Turkey itself is small; however the majority of Orthodox Christians in North America (about two-thirds) are under the Ecumenical Patriarchate, primarily in the Greek Orthodox Archdiocese of America. The patriarchate also enjoys an even greater majority in the United Kingdom. Furthermore, the Albanian, Rusyn and Ukrainian jurisdictions in America are also part of the Patriarchate.

Most of the Patriarchate's funding does not come directly from its member churches, but rather from the government of Greece, due to an arrangement whereby the Patriarchate had transferred property it had owned to Greece. In exchange, the employees (including the clergy) of the Patriarchate are remunerated by the Greek government as public servants. The Greek Orthodox Archdiocese of America provides substantial support through an annual contribution, known as the logia, and its institutions, including the American-based Greek Orthodox Ladies Philoptochos Society and the Archons of the Ecumenical Patriarchate, a society of dedicated laymen who make large donations for the upkeep of the Patriarchate. In turn, they are granted honorary titles which once belonged to members of the Patriarchal staff in centuries past.

The Patriarchate acts in the capacity of being an intermediary and facilitator between the Orthodox churches, and also in interdenominational or interfaith relations. This role sometimes brings the Patriarchate into conflict with other Orthodox churches, as its role in the church is debated. The question centers around whether the Ecumenical Patriarchate is simply the most honored among the Orthodox churches, or whether it has any real authority or prerogatives (πρεσβεία, presveía) that differ from the other autocephalous churches. This dispute is often between Constantinople and Moscow, the largest Orthodox church in terms of population, especially as expressed in the Third Rome theory which places Moscow in the place of Constantinople as the center of world Orthodoxy. Such disputes sometimes result in temporary breaks in full communion, though usually not for very long.

The relationship between Constantinople and the Ottoman Empire was frequently bitter, due in no small part to the privileged legal and social position accorded to Islam. Turkish law requires that the Patriarch be a Turkish citizen by birth (which all Patriarchs have been since 1923), and an ethnic Greek from the decreasing Greek minority of Turkey, which is causing a shortage of priests and consequently potential candidates for the post of Ecumenical Patriarch. The closing of the Orthodox Theological School of Halki is also a difficulty faced by the Patriarchate.

In 2024, after protests from Turkey, the signature of the Ecumenical Patriarch was removed from the statement of the June 2024 Ukraine peace summit.

== Administration and structure ==
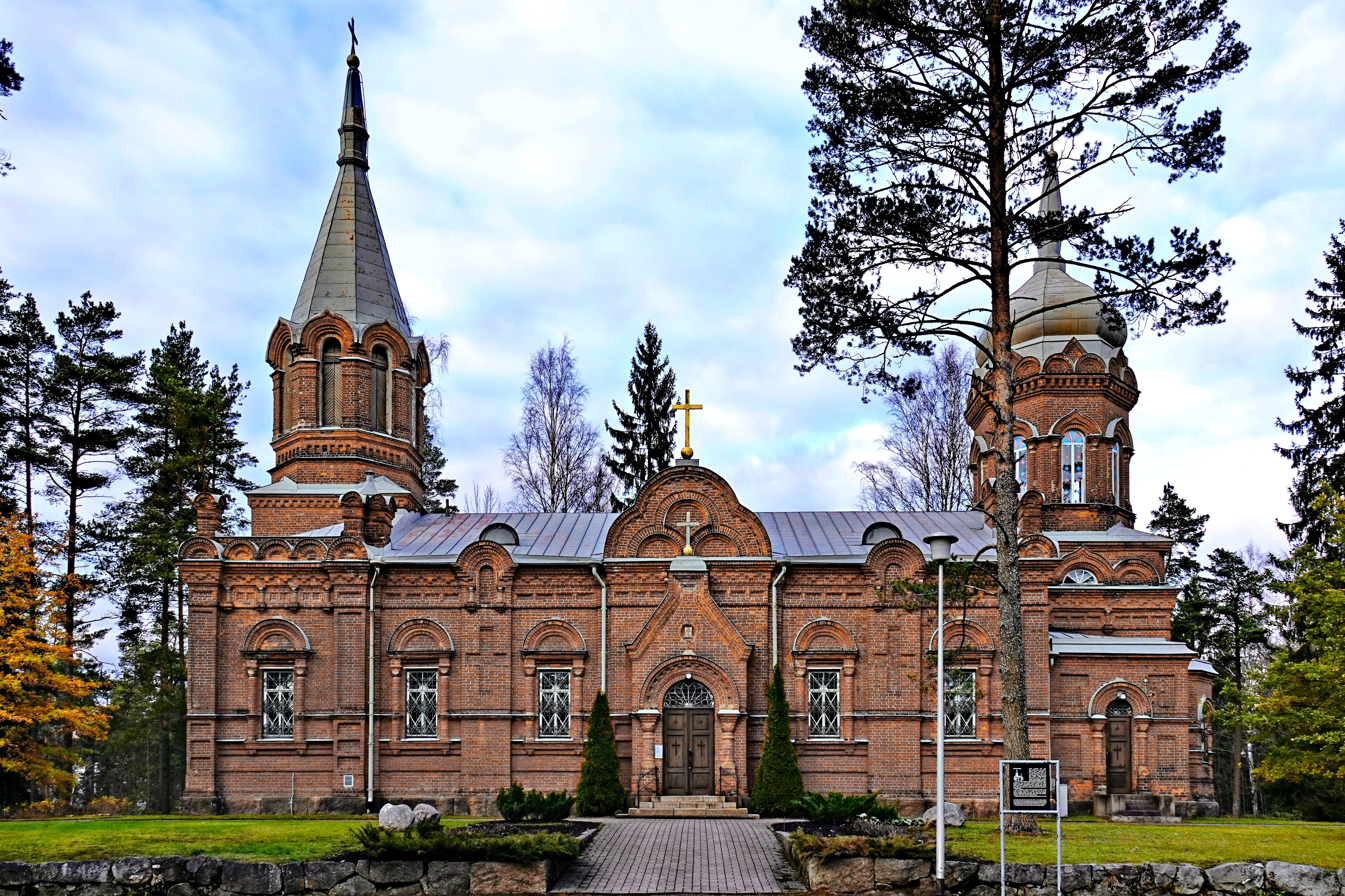
The Church of the Holy Cross in Kouvola, Finland.

=== Holy Synod ===
The affairs of the Patriarchate are overseen by the Holy Synod of the Ecumenical Patriarchate of Constantinople, presided by the Ecumenical Patriarch. The synod has existed since prior to the fourth century, and assists the Patriarch in determining the affairs of the possessions under his jurisdiction. The synod first developed from what was referred to as the resident synod, composed of the Patriarch, local bishops, and any Orthodox bishops who were visiting in the imperial capital of Constantinople. After the fall of Constantinople, the synod's membership became limited to bishops of the Patriarchate.

The Holy and Sacred Synod, presided over by His All-Holiness Ecumenical Patriarch Bartholomew I, is composed of twelve hierarchs, each serving a year-long term, with half of the synod's members changing every six months in March and September.

The current members of the Holy and Sacred Synod, serving since February 28, 2026, are as follows:

- Emmanuel of Chalcedon
- Amvrosios of Karpathos and Kasos
- Apostolos of Miletus
- Iosif of Prokonnesos
- Meliton of Philadelphia
- Athanasios of Koloneia
- Theoliptos of Iconium
- Iosif of Buenos Aires
- Cleopas of Sweden and all Scandinavia
- Cyril of Imbros and Tenedos
- Konstantinos of Denver
- Gregorios of Ankara

Notable hierarchs of the Ecumenical Patriarchate include the popular writer Kallistos (Timothy) Ware, an assistant-bishop in the Archdiocese of Thyateira and author of The Orthodox Church, the best-known introduction to the Orthodox Church in English, and John Zizioulas, Metropolitan of Pergamon, a well-known professor of systematic theology.

=== Structure ===
World jurisdictions of Eastern Orthodox Churches, 2022

The head of the Patriarchate of Constantinople and of the Holy Synod is the Archbishop of Constantinople-New Rome and Ecumenical Patriarch, who additionally serves as co-Head of State of Mount Athos. Since 1991, Bartholomew I (born Dimítrios Archontónis) has led the role. The local churches of the Ecumenical Patriarchate consist of six archdioceses, 66 metropolises, 2 dioceses and one exarchate, each of which reports directly to the Patriarch of Constantinople with no intervening authority.

Map of the Greek-Orthodox metropolises in Asia Minor, c. 1880

==== Eparchies of the Throne ====
===== Archdiocese of Constantinople =====
- Archdiocese of Constantinople (Patriarchal Archdiocese):
  - Episcopal Region of Stavrodromi
  - Episcopal Region of Tatavla
  - Episcopal Region of Bosporus
  - Episcopal Region of Psamatheia
  - Episcopal Region of Phanar – Golden Horn

===== Metropolitan sees in Turkiye =====
- Metropolis of Chalcedon: Emmanuel Adamakis (2021–)
- Metropolis of Derkoi: Apostolos Daniilidis (2011–)
- Metropolis of the Princes' Islands: Dimitrios Kommatas (2018–)
- Metropolis of Vryoula: Panteleimon Sklavos (2018–)
- Metropolis of Pisidia: Job Getcha (2022–)
- Metropolis of Selybria: Maximos Vgenopoulos (2014–)
- Metropolis of Adrianopolis: Amfilochios of Adrianoupolis
- Metropolis of Smyrna: Bartholomew Samaras (2016–)
- Metropolis of Imbros and Tenedos: Cyril Sykis (2020–)
- Metropolis of Prusa: Ioakeim Billis (2021–)
- Metropolis of Ganos and Chora: Maximos Vgenopoulos (2022–) as Patriarchal Commissioner

===== Metropolitan sees in Greece =====
====== Dodecanese ======
- Metropolis of Karpathos and Kasos: Ambrosios Panagiotidis (1983–)
- Metropolis of Kos and Nisyros: Nathaniel II (Philippos) Diakopanagiotis (2009–)
- Metropolis of Leros, Kalymnos and Astypalaia and Exarchate of the Southern Sporades: Païsios (Panagiotis) Aravantinos (2005–)
- Metropolis of Rhodes: Cyril II (Konstantinos) Kogerakis (2004–)
- Metropolis of Syme: Chrysostomos Pitsis (2018–)
- Exarchate of Patmos: Archimandrite Cyril Pentes

====== The "New Lands" ======
Spiritually assigned to the Ecumenical Patriarchate by the Patriarchal and Synodic Act of 4 September 1928:

  - Metropolis of Alexandroupolis: Anthimos Koukouridis (2004–)
  - Metropolis of Chios, Psara and Inousses: Markos Basilakis (2011–)
  - Metropolis of Didymoteichon and Orestias: Damaskinos (Minas) Karpathakis (2009–)
  - Metropolis of Drama: Dorotheos Paparis (2022–)
  - Metropolis of Dryinoupolis, Pogoniani and Konitsa: Andreas Trempelas (1995–)
  - Metropolis of Edessa, Pella and Almopia: Joel (Panagiotis) Phrankakos (2002–)
  - Metropolis of Elassona: Hariton Toumbas (2014–)
  - Metropolis of Eleftheroupolis: Chrysostomos Abagianos (2004–)
  - Metropolis of Florina, Prespes and Eordaia: Eirinaios Laftsis (2023–)
  - Metropolis of Goumenissa, Axioupoli and Polykastro: Dimitrios Bekiaris (1989–)
  - Metropolis of Grevena: David Tzioumakas (2014–)
  - Metropolis of Ierissos, Mount Athos and Ardameri: Theoklitos Athanasopoulos (2012–)
  - Metropolis of Ioannina: Maximos Papagiannis (2014–)
  - Metropolis of Kassandria: Nikodemos (Konstantinos) Korakis (2001–)
  - Metropolis of Kastoria: Kallinikos Georgatos (2021–)
  - Metropolis of Kitros, Katerini and Platamonas: Georgios Chrysostomou (2014–)
  - Metropolis of Langadas, Liti and Rentina: Platon Crikris (2021–)
  - Metropolis of Lemnos and Agios Efstratios: Hierotheos Calogeropoulos (2019–)
  - Metropolis of Maronia and Komotini: Panteleimon Moutafis (2013–)
  - Metropolis of Mithymna: Chrysostomos Kalamatianos (1984–)
  - Metropolis of Mytilini, Eresos and Plomari: Iakovos Frantzes (1988–)
  - Metropolis of Neapolis and Stavroupolis: Barnabas Tyris (2004–)
  - Metropolis of Nea Krini and Kalamaria: Ioustinos Bardakas (2015–)
  - Metropolis of Nea Zichni and Nevrokopion: Hierotheos (Dimitrios) Tsoliakos (2003–)
  - Metropolis of Nicopolis and Preveza: Meletios Kalamaras (1980–2012), Chrysostom Tsirigas (2012–)
  - Metropolis of Paramythia, Filiates, Giromeri and Parga: Serapion Michalakis (2023–)
  - Metropolis of Philippi, Neapolis and Thasos: Stefanos Tolios (2017–)
  - Metropolis of Polyani and Kilkis: Vartholomeos Antoniou-Triantafyllides (2021–)
  - Metropolis of Samos and Ikaria: Eusebios (Evangelos) Pistolis (1995–)
  - Metropolis of Serres and Nigrita: Theologos (Ioannis) Apostolidis (2001–)
  - Metropolis of Servia and Kozani: Paulos Papalexiou (2004–)
  - Metropolis of Siderokastron: Makarios (Sotirios) Philotheou (2001–)
  - Metropolis of Sisanion and Siatista: Athanasios Giannousas (2019–)
  - Metropolis of Thessaloniki: Filotheos Theocharis (2023–)
  - Metropolis of Veria and Naousa: Panteleimon (Ioannis) Kalpakidis (1994–)
  - Metropolis of Xanthi and Peritheorion: Panteleimon (Mikhael) Kalaphatis (1995–)

====== Church of Crete ======
- Archdiocese of Crete (Heraklion): Evgenios Antonopoulos (2022–)
  - Metropolis of Gortyna and Arkadia and Exarchate of Middle Crete: Makarios Douloufakis (2005–)
  - Metropolis of Rethymnon and Avlopotamos and Exarchate of Upper Crete: Prodromos Xenakes (2022–);
  - Metropolis of Kydonia and Apokoronos: Damaskinos Papagiannakis (2006–)
  - Metropolis of Lampi, Syvritos, and Sfakia: Eirinaios (Nikolaos) Mesarchakis (1990–)
  - Metropolis of Ierapytna and Siteia and Exarchate of Eastern Crete: Cyrillos Diamantakes (2016–)
  - Metropolis of Petra and Cherronisos: Nektarios Papadakis (1990–2015), Gerasimos Marmatakes(2015–)
  - Metropolis of Kissamos and Selino: Amphilochios Andronikakis (2005–)
  - Metropolis of Arkalochorion, Kastelion and Viannos: Andreas Nanakis (2001–)

===== Eparchies in Europe =====
- Archdiocese of Thyateira and Great Britain (London, includes the UK and the Crown dependencies): Nikitas Loulias (2019–)
- Metropolis of France (Paris): Dimitrios Ploumes (2021–)
- Metropolis of Germany (Bonn): Augustinos Labardakis (1980–)
- Metropolis of Austria and Exarchate of Hungary and Middle Europe (Vienna): Arsenios Kardamakis (2011–)
- Metropolis of Sweden and all Scandinavia and Exarchate of the Northern Countries (Stockholm): Cleopas Strongylis (2014–)
- Metropolis of Belgium and Exarchate of the Netherlands and Luxembourg (Brussels): Athenagoras (Yves) Peckstadt (2013–)
- Metropolis of Switzerland (Chambésy, Geneva): Maximos Pothos (2018–)
- Metropolis of Italy and Exarchate of Southern Europe (Venice): Polycarpos Stavropoulos (2021–)
- Metropolis of Spain and Portugal and Exarchate of the Mediterranean Sea (Madrid): Visarion Comzias (2021–)
- Metropolis of Ireland and Exarchate of Celtic Sea (Dublin): Iakovos Antonopoulos (2020-)
- Patriarchal Exarchate of Malta: Metropolitan Kyrillos Katerelos (2021–)
- Patriarchal Exarchate of Lithuania: Paneretos (Matthaios) Psaraftis (2026–)

===== Eparchies in Asia =====
- Metropolis of Hong Kong and Southeast Asia and Exarchate of the Philippines: Nektarios (Tsilis) (2008–)
- Metropolis of Korea and Exarchate of All the Upper East (Seoul): Ambrosios (Aristotelis) Zografos (2008–)
- Metropolis of Singapore and South Asia: Konstantinos Tsilis (2008–)

===== Eparchies in America =====
- Archdiocese of Canada and Exarchate of the Arctic (Toronto): Apostolos Koufallakis (2026–)
- Archdiocese of America and Exarchate of the Atlantic and Pacific Oceans (headquartered in New York City): Elpidoforos Lampriniadis (2019–)
  - Metropolis of Chicago: Nathanael Symeonides (2018–)
  - Metropolis of New Jersey: Athenagoras Ziliaskopoulos (2026–)
  - Metropolis of Atlanta: Alexios Panagiotopoulos (1999–)
  - Metropolis of Denver: Constantine Moralis (2024-)
  - Metropolis of Pittsburgh: Savas Zembillas (2012–)
  - Metropolis of Boston: Methodios (Georgios) Tournas (1984–)
  - Metropolis of Detroit: Nicholas Pissaris (1999–)
  - Metropolis of San Francisco: Gerasimos Michaleas (2005–)
  - Ukrainian Orthodox Church in the USA
  - American Carpatho-Russian Orthodox Diocese
  - Albanian Orthodox Diocese in America
  - Ukrainian Orthodox Church in Canada
- Metropolis of Buenos Aires and Exarchate of All South America: Joseph Bosch (2019–)
- Metropolis of Mexico and Exarchate of All Central America and the Caribbean: Iakovos Andriopoulos (2024–)
- Metropolis of Winnipeg and Central Canada (Ukrainian Orthodox Church of Canada): vacant (acting: Bishop Ilarion of Edmonton)
  - Diocese of Toronto and Eastern Canada: Andrew Peshko (2021–)
  - Diocese of Edmonton and Western Canada: Hilarion (Rudnyk) (2008–)

===== Eparchies in Oceania =====
- Archdiocese of Australia and Exarchate of Papua New Guinea: Makarios Griniezakis (2019–)
  - Diocese of Adelaide: Silouan Fotineas (2024–)
  - Diocese of Brisbane: Bartholomew Anastasiadis (2024–)
  - Diocese of Canberra and Tasmania: Athinagoras Karakonstantakis (2025-)
  - Diocese of Melbourne: Kyriakos Michael (2024–)
  - Diocese of Chora: Evmenios Vasilopoulos (2024–)
  - Diocese of Perth: Elpidios Karalis (2024–)
- Metropolis of New Zealand and Exarchate of All Oceania (Wellington): Myron Ktistakis (2018–)

==== Titular metropolises ====
- Metropolis of Caesarea: Vacant
- Metropolis of Ephesus: Vacant
- Metropolis of Heraclea and Exarchate of Thrace: Vacant
- Metropolis of Cyzicus: Vacant
- Metropolis of Nicomedia: Vacant
- Metropolis of Nicaea and Exarchate of Bithynia: Vacant
- Metropolis of Aenos: Vacant
- Metropolis of Amasya and Exarchate of All Euxinous Pontus: Vacant
- Metropolis of Hadrianopolis: Amphilochios Stergiou (2014–)
- Metropolis of Anea: Makarios Pavlidis (2018–)
- Metropolis of Ankyra and Exarchate of All Galatia: Ieremias Kalligiorgis (2018–2025)
- Metropolis of Augustopolis: Vacant
- Metropolis of Chaldia, Cheriana and Kerasous and Exarchate of Helenopontus: Vacant
- Metropolis of Crine and Exarchate of Ionia: Kyrillos Katerelos(2021–)
- Metropolis of Cydonies: Athenagoras Hrysanes(2012–)
- Metropolis of the Dardanelles and Exarchate of All Hellespontus: Vacant
- Metropolis of Dervis: Ezekiel Kefalas (2021-)
- Metropolis of Eucarpia: Bishop Ierotheos Zaharis (2017–)
- Metropolis of Euchaita: Vacant
- Metropolis of Eudoxias: Amvrosios Horozides (2019–)
- Metropolis of Ganos and Chora and All the Thracian Coast: Vacant
- Metropolis of Helioupolis and Theira and Exarchate of All Caria: Vacant
- Metropolis of Helenopolis: Vacant
- Metropolis of Kolonia: Athanasios Theoharous (2021–)
- Metropolis of Iconium and Exarchate of Lycaonia: Theoliptos (Jacob) Fenerlis (2000–)
- Metropolis of Kallipolis and Madytos: Stephanos Ntinides (2011–)
- Metropolis of Laodicea and Exarchate of Phrygia: Theodoritos Polyzoyopoulos(2018–)
- Metropolis of Lititsa: Vacant
- Metropolis of Lystra: Isaiah Chronopoulos (2024–)
- Metropolis of Metres and Athyra: Vacant
- Metropolis of Melitene: Maximos Pafilis (2018–)
- Metropolis of Miletus: Apostolos Voulgaris (1990–)
- Metropolis of Moschonisia and Exarchate of Aeolis: Cyril Dragounis (2020–)
- Metropolis of Myra: Chrysostomos Kalaitzis (1995–)
- Metropolis of Myriophyton and Peristasis: Irinaios Ioannidis (2000–)
- Metropolis of Neocaesaria and Exarchate of Pontus Polemoniacus: Vacant
- Metropolis of Pergamon and Adramyttion: Vacant
- Metropolis of Perge and Exarchate of Pamphylia: Vacant
- Metropolis of Philadelphia and Exarchate of Lydia: Meliton (Dimitrios) Karras (1990–)
- Metropolis of Pisidia and Exarchate of Side, Myra and Attalia: Job Getcha (2022–)
- Metropolis of Prokonnesos and Exarchate of All Propontis: Joseph (Emmanuel) Charkiolakis (2008–)
- Metropolis of Prousa:Ioakeim Billis (2021–)
- Metropolis of Rhodopolis: Tarasios Antonopoulos (2019–)
- Metropolis of Saranta Ecclesies: Andreas Sofianopoulos (2021–)
- Metropolis of Sardis: Evangelos Courounis (2021–)
- Metropolis of Sasima and Cappadocia Secunda: Constantine Moralis (2022–)
- Metropolis of Sebasteia and Exarchate of All Paphlagonia: Seraphim Ginis (2019–)
- Metropolis of Seleucia and Pamphylia: Theodoros Meimares (2023–)
- Metropolis of Silyvria: Maximos Vgenopoulos (2014–)
- Metropolis of Smyrna and Exarchate of All Asia Minor: Bartholomeos Samaras (2016–)
- Metropolis of Traianopolis: Vacant
- Metropolis of Trapezous and Exarchate of Lazica: Vacant
- Metropolis of Troas: Petros Bozinis (2015–)
- Metropolis of Tyana: Vacant
- Metropolis of Tyroloi and Serention: Vacant
- Metropolis of Bizye and Medea: Athenagoras Anastasiadis (2024–)
- Metropolis of Vryoula and Erythrae: Panteleimon Sklavos (2018–)

==== Titular dioceses ====
- Diocese of Abydos: Gregorios Tsoutsoules (2022–)
- Diocese of Amorion: Nikiforos Psihloudes (2014–)
- Diocese of Andidon:Vacant
- Diocese of Apamea: Païsios Larentzakis (2018–)
- Diocese of Arianzos: Vartholomeos (Ioannis) Kessidis (2004–)
- Diocese of Ariste: Vacant
- Diocese of Aspendos: Jeremy Ferens (1995–)
- Diocese of Claudiopolis: Iakovos Savva (2021–)
- Diocese of Cotyaeum: Dionysios Papavasileiou (2022–)
- Diocese of Christoupolis: Emmanuel Sfiatkos (2020–)
- Diocese of Cyneae: Vacant
- Diocese of Dioclea: Kallistos Ware (1982–2022)
- Diocese of Dorylaeum: Damaskenos Lionakis (2019–)
- Diocese of Eumeneia: Irinaeos Verykakis (2019–)
- Diocese of Halicarnassus: Adrianos Sergakis (2015–)
- Diocese of Irenopolis: Nikandros Palyvos (2019–)
- Diocese of Kratea: Georgios Antonopoulos(2022–)
- Diocese of Kerasounta: Christophoros Krikelis (2025–)
- Diocese of Lampsacus: Vacant
- Diocese of Lefki: Eumenios Tamiolakis (1994–)
- Diocese of Meloa: Aimilianos Coutouzes (2019–)
- Diocese of Mokissos: Demetrios Kantzavelos (2006–)
- Diocese of Olympos:Kyrillos Papanthimou(2017–)
- Diocese of Pamphylos: Daniel Zelinsky (2008–)
- Diocese of Parnassus: John Derevianka (1995–)
- Diocese of Phasiane: Antonios Paropoulos (2002–)
- Diocese of Philomelion: Theophan Koja (2023–)
- Diocese of Sinope: Vacant
- Diocese of Synnada: Vacant
- Diocese of Telmessos: Vacant
- Diocese of Theoupolis: Vacant
- Diocese of Thermon: Athenagoras Fasiolo (2022–)
- Diocese of Troas: Petros Bozines (2015–)
- Diocese of Tropaeon: Vacant
- Diocese of Zela: Sevastianos Skordallos (2012–)

==== Historical archdioceses ====
- Archdiocese of Syracuse
- Archdiocese of Russian Orthodox churches in Western Europe—Exarchate for Orthodox Parishes of Russian Tradition in Western Europe (Paris) (disestablished 2018)

==== Historical metropolises ====
- Metropolis of Anchialos
- Metropolis of Balgrad, one of founding archdioceses of Romanian Orthodox Church
- Metropolis of Calabria
- Metropolis of Devròn and Velissus, under jurisdiction of the Ecumenical Patriarchate from 1767 to 1920
- Metropolis of Gothia and Caffa (liquidated by the Russian Orthodox Church in 1779, see Annexation of Crimea by the Russian Empire)
- Metropolis of Kamianets (Podolia Eyalet)
- Metropolis of Kolonia
- Metropolis of Kiev and all Rus' (988–1448), some territories of Upper Volga and Oka assumed a schism; Metropolis reorganized as Metropolis of Kiev, Galicia and all Rus'
  - Metropolis of Halych (1303–1347), succeeded and reintegrated back into Metropolis of Kiev
  - Metropolis of Lithuania (1317–1435), succeeded and reintegrated back into Metropolis of Kiev
- Metropolis of Kiev, Galicia and all Rus' (1448–1596) accepted a union with Rome, see Ruthenian Uniate Church
- Metropolis of Kiev, Galicia and all Rus' (1620–1696) annexed by Russian Orthodox Church
- Metropolis of Miletopolis: Iakovos Tsigounis (2011–)
- Metropolis of Melenikon
- Metropolis of Moldo-Wallachia (Metropolis of Moldavia and Bukovina), one of founding archdioceses of Romanian Orthodox Church
- Metropolis of Monastirion and Pelagonia, under jurisdiction of the Ecumenical Patriarchate from 1767 to 1920
- Metropolis of Nevrokopion
- Metropolis of Philippopolis
- Metropolis of Prèspes and Achrida, under jurisdiction of the Ecumenical Patriarchate from 1767 to 1920
- Metropolis of Proilaviei (Ottoman Ukraine)
- Metropolis of Raskopresrèna, under jurisdiction of the Ecumenical Patriarchate from 1766 to 1920
- Metropolis of Riga and All Latvia
- Metropolis of Skopia, under jurisdiction of the Ecumenical Patriarchate from 1766 to 1920
- Metropolis of Sozopolis (and later Sozoagathopolis):
- Metropolis of Stromnitsa, under jurisdiction of the Ecumenical Patriarchate from 1767 to 1920
- Metropolis of Ugro-Wallachia (Metropolis of Muntenia and Dobrudja), one of founding archdioceses of Romanian Orthodox Church
- Metropolis of Vanialuka, under jurisdiction of the Ecumenical Patriarchate from 1900 to 1920
- Metropolis of Varna
- Metropolis of Vellègradon, under jurisdiction of the Ecumenical Patriarchate from 1766 to 1879
- Metropolis of Nissa, under jurisdiction of the Ecumenical Patriarchate from 1766 to 1879
- Metropolis of Vosna, under jurisdiction of the Ecumenical Patriarchate from 1766 to 1920
- Metropolis of Svornikion, under jurisdiction of the Ecumenical Patriarchate from 1766 to 1920

==== Historical dioceses ====
- Diocese of Agia and Sykourion
- Diocese of Agrafa and Litza
- Diocese of Amphipolis
- Diocese of Amylcae
- Diocese of Christianoupolis
- Diocese of Angon
- Diocese of Argyropolis
- Diocese of Agathopolis
- Diocese of Agathonicea
- Diocese of Katania
- Diocese of Konstantia
- Diocese of Daphnusia
- Diocese of Dodona
- Diocese of Elaea
- Diocese of Kampania
- Diocese of Meloe
- Diocese of Messene
- Diocese of Myrina
- Diocese of Nyssa
- Diocese of Petra
- Diocese of Platamon and Lykostomion
- Diocese of Ravenna
- Diocese of Skopelos
- Diocese of Talantion
- Diocese of Thermia and Kea
- Diocese of Trachaea
- Diocese of Vilna

==== Stauropegions ====
- Stauropegion of St. Andrew's Church in Kyiv: Bishop Michael (Anischenko) (2019–)
- Kyiv Pechersk Lavra (1589–1686)
- Lviv Dormition Brotherhood (1589–1709)
- Kyiv Epiphany Brotherhood (1620–1686)
- Manyava Skete (1620–1785)
- Exaltation of the Cross Lutsk Brotherhood (1623–????)
- Mezhyhirya Monastery (1609–1703)

== Present-day autocephalous churches previously under the Ecumenical Patriarchate ==
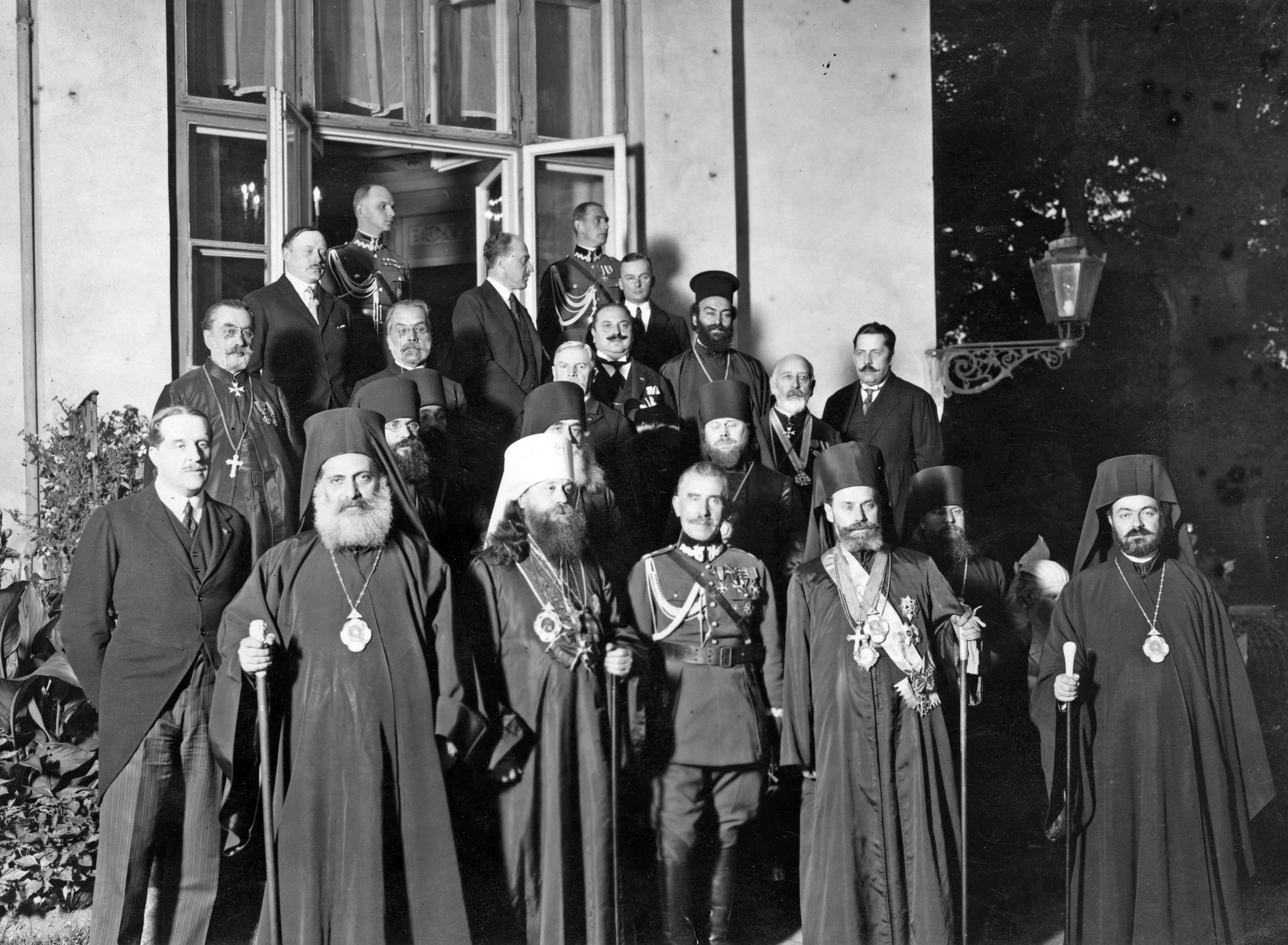
Delegates of the Polish Orthodox Church and the Ecumenical Patriarchate of Constantinople in front of the Belweder Palace on the day of the proclamation of the autocephaly of the Polish Orthodox Church in Poland

- Armenian Apostolic Church; autocephaly granted in 554. (Not part of the Eastern Orthodox Church, but of the Oriental Orthodox Churches)
- Bulgarian Orthodox Church; autocephaly granted in 870; re-recognized in 1235 and 1945.
- Russian Orthodox Church; autocephaly recognized in 1589.
- Church of Greece; autocephaly recognized in 1850.
- Serbian Orthodox Church; autocephaly granted in 1219; abolished in 1463 and 1766, re-recognized in 1557 and 1879.
- Romanian Orthodox Church; autocephaly recognized in 1885.
- Polish Orthodox Church; autocephaly recognized in 1924 by the Ecumenical Patriarchate of Constantinople and in 1948 by the Russian Orthodox Church.
- Albanian Orthodox Church; autocephaly recognized in 1937.
- Orthodox Church of the Czech Lands and Slovakia; autocephaly recognized in 1951 by the Russian Orthodox Church and in 1998 by the Ecumenical Patriarchate of Constantinople.
- Orthodox Church of Ukraine; the Ecumenical Patriarchate announced its intention to grant autocephaly to the Orthodox Church of Ukraine in 2018 and formally granted it on January 5, 2019. The decision resulted in a schism with the Russian Orthodox Church. As of 2026, the autocephaly of the Orthodox Church of Ukraine remains only partially recognized by other Eastern Orthodox churches.

== See also ==
- Eastern Orthodoxy in Greece
  - Timeline of Eastern Orthodoxy in Greece (33–717)
  - Timeline of Eastern Orthodoxy in Greece (717–1204)
  - Timeline of Eastern Orthodoxy in Greece (1204–1453)
  - Timeline of Eastern Orthodoxy in Greece (1453–1821)
  - Timeline of Eastern Orthodoxy in Greece (1821–1924)
  - Timeline of Eastern Orthodoxy in Greece (1924–1974)
  - Timeline of Eastern Orthodoxy in Greece (1974–2008)
  - Timeline of Eastern Orthodoxy in Greece (from 2008)
- Eastern Orthodoxy in North America
- Christianity in Turkey
- Turkish Orthodox Church
- San Giorgio dei Greci
- Patriarch Athenagoras Orthodox Institute
- Hellenic College Holy Cross Greek Orthodox School of Theology
- St Andrew's Greek Orthodox Theological College

== Literature ==
- Darrouzès, Jean, ed. (1981). Notitiae Episcopatuum Ecclesiae Constantinopolitanae. Paris: Institut français d'études byzantines. ISBN 978-9042931183.
- Kiminas, Demetrius (2009). The Ecumenical Patriarchate: A History of Its Metropolitanates with Annotated Hierarch Catalogs. Wildside Press LLC. ISBN 978-1434458766.
- Kursar, Vjeran (2013). "Non-Muslim Communal Divisions and Identities in the Early Modern Ottoman Balkans and the Millet System Theory". Power and Influence in South-Eastern Europe, 16th–19th century. Berlin: LIT Verlag. pp. 97–108. ISBN 978-3643903310.
- Laurent, Vitalien (1968). "Les premiers patriarches de Constantinople sous la domination turque (1454–1476): Succession et chronologie d'après un catalogue inédit". Revue des études byzantines. 26: 229–263. doi:10.3406/rebyz.1968.1407.
- McGuckin, John Anthony (3 February 2014). The Concise Encyclopedia of Orthodox Christianity. John Wiley & Sons. ISBN 978-1-118-75933-2.
- Meyendorff, John (1989). Imperial unity and Christian divisions: The Church 450–680 A.D. The Church in history. Vol. 2. Crestwood, NY: St. Vladimir's Seminary Press. ISBN 978-0881410563.
- Meyendorff, John (1996). Rome, Constantinople, Moscow: Historical and Theological Studies. Crestwood, NY: St. Vladimir's Seminary Press. ISBN 978-0881411348.
- Ostrogorsky, George (1956). History of the Byzantine State. Oxford: Basil Blackwell.
- Radojević, Mira; Mićić, Srđan B. (2015). "Serbian Orthodox Church cooperation and frictions with Ecumenical Patriarchate of Constantinople and Bulgarian Exarchate during interwar period". Studia academica šumenesia. 2: 126‒143.
- Runciman, Steven (1985) [1968]. The Great Church in Captivity: A Study of the Patriarchate of Constantinople from the Eve of the Turkish Conquest to the Greek War of Independence (2nd ed.). Cambridge: Cambridge University Press. ISBN 978-0521313100.
- Thomas, John P. (1987). Private Religious Foundations in the Byzantine Empire. Washington, D.C.: Dumbarton Oaks. ISBN 978-0884021643.
