= Christophoros Krikelis =

Greek Orthodox bishop in Australia

His Grace Christophoros of Kerasounta
- Auxiliary Bishop, Protosyncellus of the Greek Orthodox Archdiocese of Australia
- Church: Eastern Orthodox Church
- Archdiocese: Greek Orthodox Archdiocese of Australia
- See: Kerasounta (titular)
- Elected: 29 August 2025

Orders
- Ordination: (Deacon) 24 October 2019 (Priest) 29 June 2020 by Archbishop Makarios of Australia
- Consecration: 28 September 2025 by Archbishop Makarios of Australia

Personal details
- Born: Nikolaos Krikelis; 27 March 1981 (age 45) Geelong, Australia
- Parents: Fr. Protopresbyter Jordan Krikelis; Presbytera Polyxeni Krikelis
- Education: University of Victoria; Australian Catholic University; St. Andrew's Theological College

Bishop Christophoros (born (secular name): Nikolaos Krikelis, Greek: Νικόλαος Κρικέλης) was born on 27 March 1981 in Geelong, Australia and is currently the Auxiliary Bishop to Archbishop Makarios of Australia and Chancellor of the Greek Orthodox Archdiocese of Australia. He also currently serves as Dean of the Cathedral of the Annunciation in Redfern,Sydney and Chaplain of St Andrew's Greek Orthodox Theological College.

== Biography ==
Nikolaos Krikelis was born in Geelong, Australia in 1981, to Protopresbyter Jordan Krikelis and Presbytera Polyxeni Krikelis.

In 1999, Nikolaos studied accounting at Victoria University, achieving a Certificate III and IV in Business Studies – Accounting. In 2008, he achieved a bachelor's degree in primary and secondary education from the same university. This led to him working in the Catholic education system in Australia for ten years.

In 2015, after studying at the Australian Catholic University, Nikolaos graduated with a graduate certificate in Catholic studies. In 2019, he received a bachelor's degree in theology from his studies at St Andrew's Greek Orthodox Theological College, with a major in Pastoral theology and a minor in Biblical studies. Subsequently, after graduating from St Andrew's Theological College, he was appointed Chaplain, where he remains until this day, overseeing the resident students studying for a Bachelor of Theology degree.

=== Monastic and clerical life ===
On 30 August 2019, Nikolaos was tonsured a Rassophore monastic by Archbishop Makarios of Australia, at the Cathedral of the Annunciation in Redfern, NSW. At his tonsure, he took the name Christophoros. That same year, on 24 October, he was ordained a hierodeacon by Archbishop Makarios at the Archdiocesan Church of Our Lady "Axion Estin" in Northcote, Victoria. Later that year, on 4 December, he was assigned the role of Director of the Personal Office of the Archbishop of Australia.

On 29 June 2020 Fr. Hierodeacon Christophoros was ordained a presbyter (hieromonk) and also elevated to the rank of Archimandrite, at the Annunciation Cathedral by Archbishop Makarios. On 23 July of that year, he was soon appointed as Dean of the Annunciation Cathedral. On 1 December 2021, Archimandrite Christophoros assumed the role of Protosyncellus (Chancellor) of the Greek Orthodox Archdiocese of Australia. On 9 May 2022, Archbishop Makarios bestowed upon Fr. Christophoros the rank of Archimandrite of the Ecumenical Throne.

On 22 August 2025 the Holy Synod of the Greek Orthodox Archdiocese of Australia convened in Sydney. At this meeting, a triprosopon ("three-person" in Greek) list was created for the position of Auxiliary bishop to the Archbishop. Archimandrite Christophoros was listed on the triprosopon for Auxiliary Bishop to the Archbishop, which led to his subsequent election on 29 August 2025, by the Holy Synod of the Ecumenical Patriarchate of Constantinople. It was decided that Bishop-elect Christophoros would take the titular see of Kerasounta.

On discovering the news of Bishop-elect Christophoros' election, the Pontian community of Sydney "Panagia Soumela" rejoiced, congratulating him in an open statement online.

On 28 September 2025 Bishop-elect Christophoros was ordained to the episcopate at Annunciation Cathedral, by Archbishop Makarios of Australia.
