= Sklavos =

Sklavos (Greek: Σκλάβος) is a Greek surname. Notable people with the surname include:

- Panteleimon Sklavos (born 1936), Greek bishop
- Vangelis Sklavos (born 1977), Greek basketball player
