= St Andrew's Greek Orthodox Theological College =

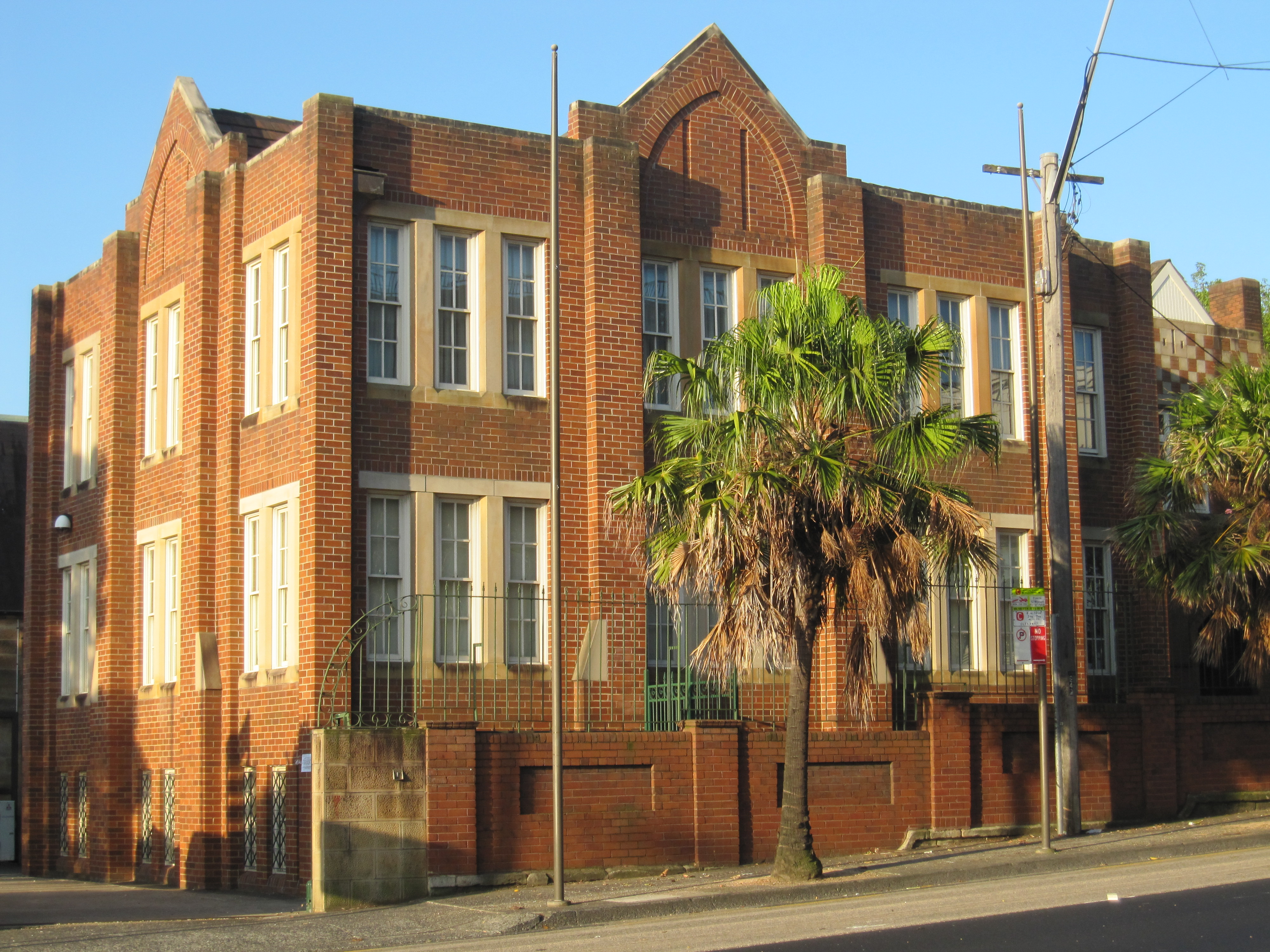
- St Andrew's Greek Orthodox Theological College
- Type: Seminary and theological college
- Established: 1986; 40 years ago
- Founder: Archbishop Stylianos Harkianakis
- Religious affiliation: Greek Orthodox Archdiocese of Australia
- Academic affiliations: Sydney College of Divinity
- Dean: Archbishop Makarios of Australia
- Sub-Dean: Philip Kariatlis
- Academic staff: 19
- Administrative staff: 3
- Location: Redfern, Sydney, New South Wales, Australia; 33.8890°S 151.2025°E
- Website: sagotc.edu.au

St Andrew's Greek Orthodox Theological College is an Eastern Orthodox Christian seminary and theological college located in Redfern, a suburb of Sydney, New South Wales, Australia. The college is a member institution of the Sydney College of Divinity, a federation of theological educational institutions each operated by different Christian denominations. It is the only accredited Eastern Orthodox tertiary institution of its kind in the Southern Hemisphere and its teaching and practice are administered via the Greek Orthodox Archdiocese of Australia.

From the college's establishment in 1986 until his death in 2019, the college's Dean was Archbishop Stylianos Harkianakis. Stylianos proposed the establishment of a theological college during the fourth clergy andlaity congress in 1981. The delegates adopted his resolution for this urgent proposal and building, administrative and academic committees were formed. There was need for a theological school that would be primarily dedicated to theological study in co-operation with other theological colleges. It was hoped that a centre of theological reflection and ecumenical dialogue would be created, offering the Orthodox world-view and perspective with great scriptural commentaries, the writings of the Greek Fathers, the Orthodox liturgy, iconography and spirituality. Stylianos also lectured in systematic theology.

== Influence ==
As the sole Orthodox theological college of its kind in the southern hemisphere, St. Andrew's has taught not only the clergy of the Greek Orthodox Archdiocese, but also a notable number from other jurisdictions in Australia, particularly from the Serbian Orthodox Church in Australia and New Zealand.

== Academic programs ==
=== Priestly vocations ===
The four-year program of study (encompassing the three-year Bachelor of Theology degree as well as a fourth year of Honours or studies in Pastoral Theology and Practice) is the principal means of training bilingual clergy for the Greek Orthodox Archdiocese. As such, admission is limited to those who aspire to the clergy or male students who are seeking to actively serve within the archdiocese.

=== Degree programs ===
St Andrew's currently offers the following accredited programs: Bachelor of Theology (with an honours program available), Master of Arts, Master of Theology, and a Basic Unit of Clinical Pastoral Education (CPE) in Aged Care. Honours programs for the Master of Arts, Master of Theology and doctoral programs can be undertaken through the Sydney College of Divinity.

== History ==
In the 1930s the Metropolitan Timotheos of Australia and New Zealand contemplated the possibility of establishing a theological institution. Ordinations of clergy take place in Australasia from the 1950s. Metropolitan Theophylactos of Australia and New Zealand considered the possibility of establishing an ecclesiastical seminary. In 1959 Archbishop Ezekiel of Australia gave thought to establishing an ecclesiastical seminary. He Appointed a committee for the St Andrew's War Memorial Theological College Fund, which received a donation from Sir Arthur George and Michael Papsalis; however, nothing came of this, as it is out of the reach of the Greek Orthodox in Australia at that time, and the donation is used to cover ongoing operating costs of the Archdiocese.

In 1975 Archbishop Stylianos, on arrival in Australia, focused on establishing a tertiary theological college. In January 1981, at the Fourth Clergy-Laity Congress held in Sydney, Archbishop Stylianos requested and gained support for the beginning of a theological college. The following year, during the official visit to Australia of Constantine Karamanlis, president of Greece, Archbishop Stylianos asked for help to establish a church seminary. Karamanlis asked for a feasibility study to be done by the end of his visit. However, the Speaker of the House, A Kaklamanis, ignored, then rejected the letter on the grounds that the Church should care for ecclesiastical education, not the government. In response, Archbishop Stylianos decided to re-energise the St Andrew's Brotherhood, so that all clergy make annual donations that would set an example for the laity. In May 1984 Archbishop Stylianos appointed an interim committee to consider and suggest ways of beginning the college, and to prepare the curriculum. On receipt of the report of the interim committee, in December 1984 three committees are established (building, administrative and academic). In 1985 Archbishop Stylianos sent a letter to 1,000 friends and acquaintances asking for a donation of A$1000 each. From this correspondence A$350,000 was raised and this allowed the archdiocese to make a deposit on a property in Caringbah for the financial benefit of the Theological College. With enough academically qualified and already-lecturing Orthodox, Sir Arthur George signed an agreement at the 5th Clergy-Laity conference held in Brisbane to provide the funds for the first stage of development. The donation of A$250,000 was used to renovate and modify buildings at the archdiocese by creating lecture rooms, dormitories for interstate students, an office, a library, and a common room.

In February 1986 the College opened in the presence of Metropolitan Maximos of Stavropoulis (Dean of Halki) and Premier Neville Wran. Tuition was conducted for residential male students only. No fee is charged to students and, by agreement, no wage is paid to the lecturers. The Bachelor of Theology is a four-year degree, in line with equivalent degrees in Greece.

In the early part of the following year, the first edition of Phronema, the annual theological review of the college, was published, editor by Dr Guy Freeland.

In 1995 Bishop Seraphim became the new sub-dean of St Andrew's, replacing the Reverend Deacon Dr John Chryssavgis, who later served as dean of Holy Cross. In November 1996 His All Holiness Patriarch Bartholomew I of Constantinople visited the college as part of the Sydney itinerary of his inaugural visit to Australia.

In the late 1990s and in line with equivalent degrees in Australia, the College changed the structure of Bachelor of Theology degree to a three-year degree with a compulsory fourth year of honours or alternative postgraduate work in pastoral theology and practice. Since January 2004 St Andrew's has offered two intensive course units every semester for all members of the public, towards the fulfilment of any one of three postgraduate awards accredited through the Sydney College of Divinity. These include a Graduate Certificate (after four units, the equivalent of one semester's full-time study); a Graduate Diploma (after eight units); and Masters of Arts (after twelve units).

St Andrew's Orthodox Press was established in June 2001 to produce The Greek-Australian Vema, the newspaper of the archdiocese, with the long-term view of publishing works of the faculty. In May 2005 a publishing director was employed. A book launch of The Infallibility of the Church in Orthodox Theology was held in April 2008, published jointly by ATF Press and St Andrew's Orthodox Press, written originally in Greek as a doctoral dissertation by Archimandrite Stylianos Harkianakis (1965) for the University of Athens and subsequently translated into English.

The School of Byzantine Music was established in February 2005 under the auspices of the Greek Orthodox Archdiocese of Australia and St Andrew's Greek Orthodox Theological College.

== Phronema ==
Phronema is the academic journal of the college. It has been published annually since the inception of the college. Phronema presents articles and book reviews from Orthodox and non-Orthodox academics on a wide variety of theologically-related topics.

== See also ==
- Greek Orthodox Archdiocese of Australia
- Cathedral of the Annunciation of Our Lady
