= Panteleimon Sklavos =

Panteleimon Sklavos (Greek: Παντελεήμων Σκλάβος), was ordained Metropolitan Archbishop of Vryoula in 2018 by the Ecumenical Patriarch of Constantinople. Prior to that he was the Greek Orthodox auxiliary bishop of Adelaide and then Melbourne, Australia until 1984.

Born 24 August 1936 in Thessaloniki. Graduated from the Theological School of Halki in 1959.

Ordained deacon on 17 November 1957 by the Metropolitan Dorotheos of Prince Islands. On July 6, 1961, he was ordained priest by Metropolitan Panteleimon of Thessaloniki.

In 1964 he moved to Australia where he served as parish priest at Thebarton, Adelaide diocese.

On 1 January 1971 he was ordained titular Bishop of Theoupoleos, Auxiliary Bishop of the Archdiocese of Australia. Ordination was performed by the Archbishop of Australia Ezekiel with by Bishop Gabriel of Australia (Patriarchate of Antioch) and bishop Aristarchus of Zinoupoleos.

He served as epitropos in Sydney (1971–1972), Melbourne (1972-1975 and 1979–1984) and Adelaide (1975–1979).

In 1984 Bishop Panteleimon returned to his native city of Thessaloniki, Greece. He taught theology at various schools, and later retired. Bishop Panteleimon founded many churches and parishes in Adelaide and Melbourne. He retired to Thessaloniki after a dispute with Archbishop Stylianos.
