= Makarios Griniezakis =

Greek Orthodox archbishop from 2019

His Eminence Makarios
- Archbishop of Australia
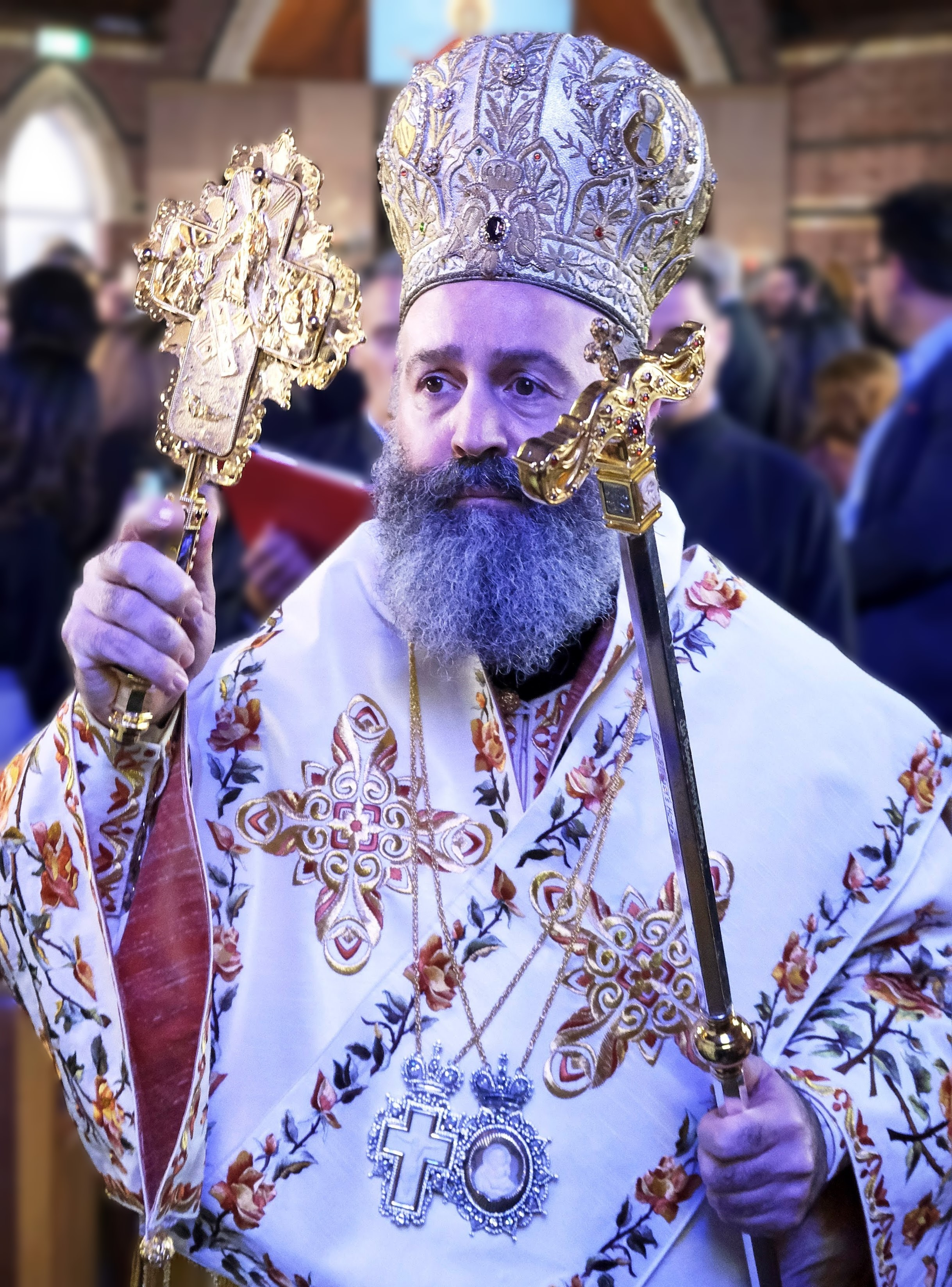
- Native name: Μακάριος Γρινιεζάκης
- Church: Ecumenical Patriarchate of Constantinople
- Archdiocese: Greek Orthodox Archdiocese of Australia
- Installed: 29 June 2019
- Predecessor: Stylianos (Harkianakis)

Orders
- Ordination: 1997
- Consecration: 16 May 2015 by Irenaeus (Athanasiadis)

Personal details
- Born: Makarios Griniezakis; March 15, 1973 (age 53) Heraklion, Crete, Greece
- Denomination: Eastern Orthodox Christian ( Greek Orthodox )
- Education: National and Kapodistrian University of Athens; Harvard University; Monash University
- Signature: Makarios's signature

Archbishop Makarios (Secular name: Makarios Griniezakis, Greek: Μακάριος Γρινιεζάκης) (b. 15 March 1973 Heraklion, Crete) is the current Archbishop of the Greek Orthodox Church of Australia and the primate of the Greek Orthodox Archdiocese of Australia and the primate and exarch of all Oceania, succeeding the late Archbishop Stylianos (Harkianakis).

== Studies and Career ==
Prior to serving in the Greek Orthodox Church, Archbishop Makarios undertook ecclesiastical and theological studies at the Rizarios Ecclesiastical School of Athens. He is a graduate of the Higher Ecclesiastical School of Athens and of the Theological School of the National and Kapodistrian University of Athens. He completed postgraduate studies at the Universities of Boston (Master of Sacred Theology), Harvard University (Master of Arts), and Monash University, (Master of Bioethics), whilst his doctoral dissertation was received and was awarded his PhD with honours by the Medical School of the University of Crete. In 2020, he founded the Byzantine Music School of Australia (BMSA),in order to preserve the century old tradition of Byzantine chanting. The work was published under the title, “Cloning: Social, Ethical and Theological Components”.

He was tonsured a monk and ordained a deacon in 1993, a priest in 1997 and an archimandrite in 1998 at the Holy Monastery of Saint George Epanosifi by Archbishop Timotheos of Crete, whilst on Easter Sunday of 2008, Ecumenical Patriarch Bartholomew I bestowed upon him the title of Archimandrite of the Ecumenical Throne at the Phanar. From 1993 until his election as bishop, he served in various administrative positions of The Holy Archdiocese of Crete.

Since 2003, Archbishop Makarios has been teaching at the Patriarchal Academy of Crete. In tandem, he has served as a visiting professor to various universities, amongst which are the Theological College of Holy Cross in Boston, the University of Tartu and the Medical Schools of the Universities of Crete, Thessaly and Athens.

== Episcopacy ==
On 27 April 2015 he was elected unanimously by the Holy Synod of the Ecumenical Patriarchate, Bishop of Christoupolis, as an assistant bishop to the Ecumenical Patriarch. He was consecrated by Archbishop Irenaeus (Athanasiadis), on the 16th of May of the same year, assuming work assigned to him by the Ecumenical Patriarch of Constantinople at the Estonian Apostolic Orthodox Church, in order to organize its theological and catechetical work. In May 2015, he was elected the first Dean of the Department of Orthodox Studies of the Autonomous Church of Estonia.

On 9 May 2019, Archbishop Makarios was unanimously elected as the new archbishop of Australia, by the Holy Synod of the Ecumenical Patriarchate, succeeding Archbishop Stylianos of Australia, who died earlier that year (on March 25).

On 18 June 2019, Archbishop Makarios arrived in Australia to be enthroned and begin his duties as the archbishop of The Holy Archdiocese of Australia. On 29 June he was enthroned.

== Views ==
=== Youth in the Greek Orthodox Church ===
In July 2024, His Eminence attended the Orthodox Youth of South Australia conference at the Greek Orthodox Church of Prophet Elias in Norwood, SA. He spoke to the youth explaining to them that "staying in the Church means being in the harbour and when someone is in the harbour, they do not suffer shipwrecks". He has stated that he wants to dedicate his position as Archbishop of Australia to keeping the youth within the Greek Orthodox Church and encourage more to get involved.

=== Abortion ===
Archbishop Makarios has taken a very strong pro-life stance on abortion. On multiple occasions, he has compared abortion to "not fulfilling the duties of a mother", he also compared it to murder and that it is a shame.

In August 2019, Archbishop Makarios attended a pro-life rally in Sydney and spoke in front of roughly 10,000 people who attended. Archbishop Makarios stated that "a child has the right to life" and "no law should take away a child's right to life". He compared the late-term abortion bill to "the re-introduction of the death penalty" which was abolished in 1955 in New South Wales. The rally was in regard to a bill to make abortion legal for up to 22 weeks of pregnancy.

=== Homosexuality ===
After the 2024 Olympic Games held in Paris, France, Makarios had a very strong reaction to the opening ceremony. He stated: “You have the freedom to live as you choose; you have the right to be homosexual, but you do not have the right to impose your way of life on our society.” This was after the depiction of drag queens that were present at the opening ceremony and the adult-type content that was aired.
