= Saint Spyridon Church (disambiguation) =

Saint Spyridon Church may refer to:

- Saint Spyridon Church, Corfu, Greece
- Saint Spyridon Church, Trieste, Italy
- Saint Spyridon Church, Focșani, Romania
- Saint Spyridon Church, Iași, Romania
- Saint Spyridon the New Church, Bucharest, Romania
- St. Spyridon's Church, Vuno, Albania
- St. Spyridon Parish of South East Sydney, New South Wales, Australia
- St. Spyridon Church, Peroj, Croatia
- St. Spyridon Greek Orthodox Church, Manhattan, United States
- St. Spyridon Church, Brežđe, Serbia

== See also ==
- St Spyridon College, Sydney, New South wales, Australia
