= CBD and South East Light Rail =

Light rail line in Sydney, Australia

L2 Randwick Line L3 Kingsford Line

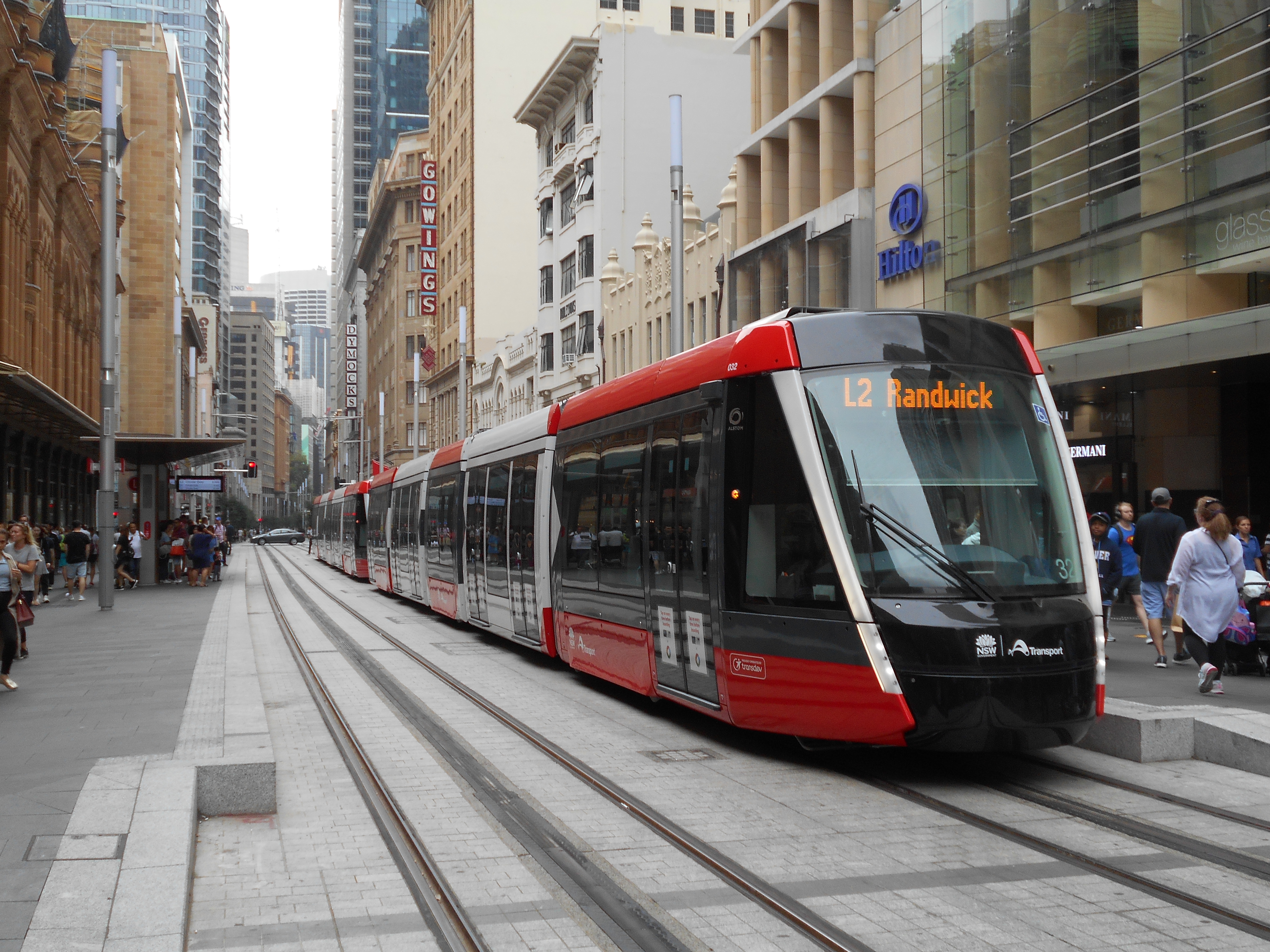
- Citadis 305 at QVB in December 2019

Overview
- Owner: Transport for NSW
- Termini: Circular Quay; Juniors Kingsford, Randwick
- Stations: 19

Service
- Services: 2
- Operator: Transdev Sydney
- Depot: Randwick
- Rolling stock: 60 × Alstom Citadis 305
- Daily ridership: 46,900 (L3); 42,066 (L2) (June 2024)

History
- Opened: 14 December 2019; 6 years ago (L2 Randwick); 3 April 2020; 6 years ago (L3 Kingsford)

Technical
- Track length: 12 km (7.5 mi)
- Track gauge: 1,435 mm (4 ft 8 1/2 in) standard gauge
- Electrification: 750 V DC from overhead catenary or APS (Note: Between Town Hall and Circular Quay)
- Operating speed: Limit of 70 km/h (43 mph)

The CBD and South East Light Rail is a pair of light rail lines running from Circular Quay through Sydney's central business district (CBD) to the south-eastern suburbs of Sydney, New South Wales, Australia. Services running to Randwick are branded as the L2 Randwick Line, with services running to Kingsford branded as the L3 Kingsford Line. Construction commenced in October 2015, with the L2 Randwick Line commencing services on 14 December 2019 and the L3 Kingsford Line on 3 April 2020.

== Background and initial announcement ==
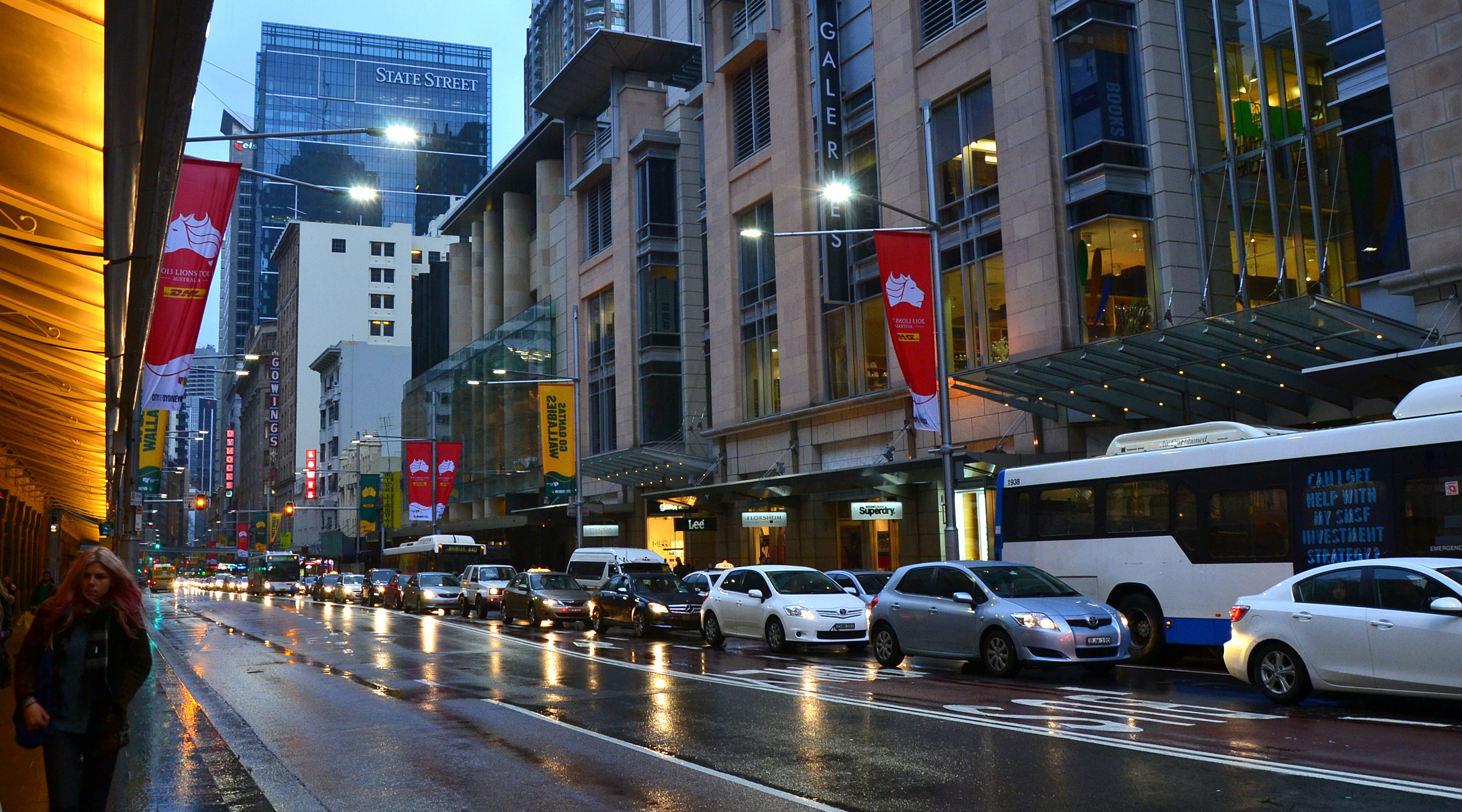
Southbound peak hour traffic congestion on George Street in 2013

Since the light rail network's original line opened in 1997, a line through the Sydney central business district had been suggested numerous times but failed to achieve State Government support. This changed in February 2010 when the Keneally Government announced a new line from Haymarket to Circular Quay via Barangaroo. The final route was not decided, with the three options being to send the line north via George Street, Sussex Street or a loop using both.

When the O'Farrell Government took office in March 2011, it committed to building a line through the CBD to Barangaroo, with a preferred route along George Street. It also committed to conducting feasibility studies into the construction of lines from the City to Sydney University and the City to the University of New South Wales. On 8 December 2011, the government announced shortlisted potential routes for these extensions. In 2012, Transport for NSW (TfNSW) decided the routes to Sydney University and Barangaroo via The Rocks provided fewer customer benefits and were considered a lower priority. A route from Circular Quay to the University of New South Wales via Central station was seen as the best option.

On 13 December 2012, the government announced a commitment to build a $1.6 billion line from Circular Quay down George Street to Central station, then across to Moore Park and down Anzac Parade with branches to Kingsford and Randwick. Construction was expected to begin in 2014 and to take five to six years.

== Design ==
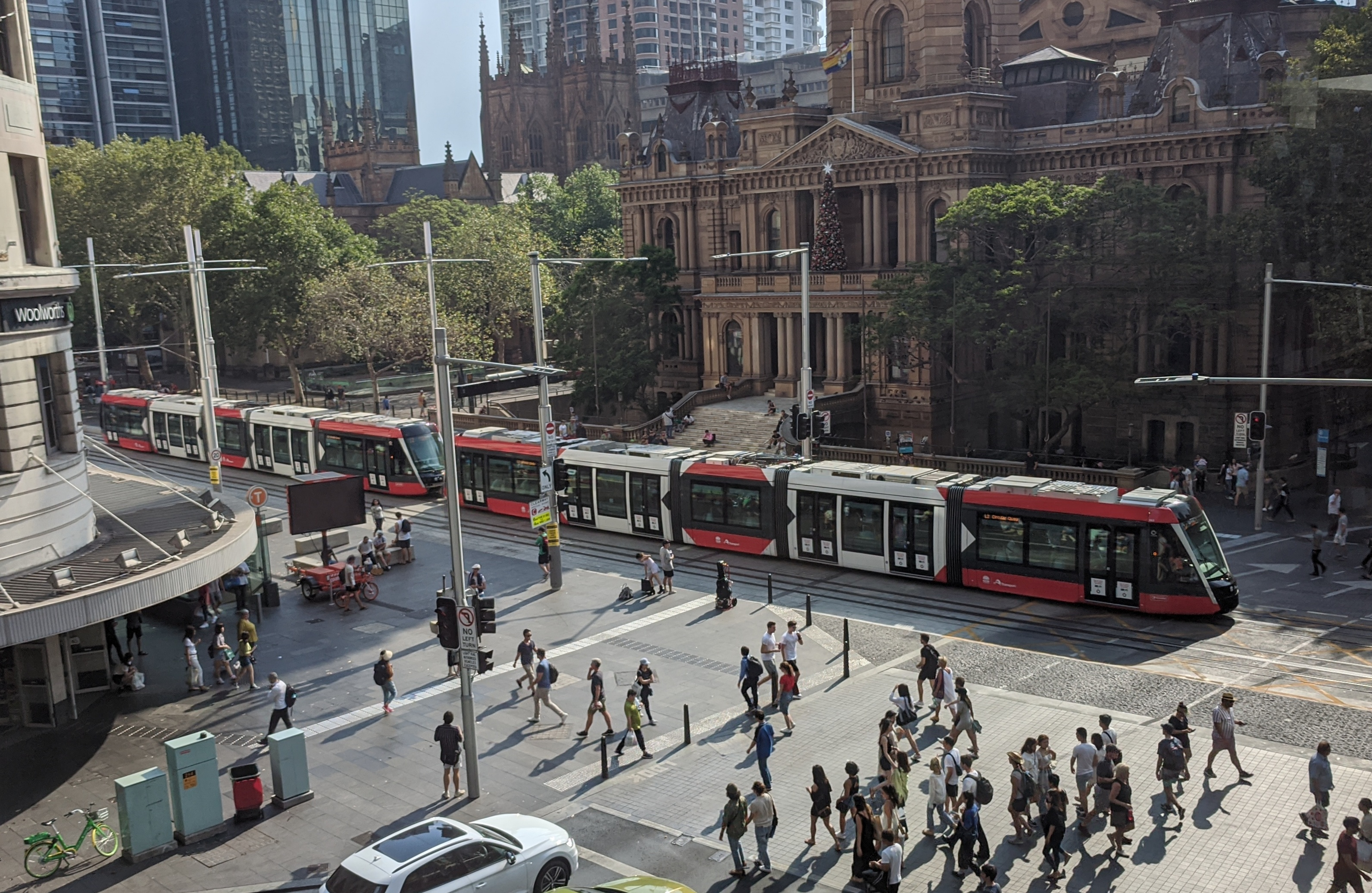
The line transitions between its wired and wire-free sections at Town Hall

The line services areas that were previously served by Sydney's former tram network. Some of the new route follows tram lines of the former network. The route is mostly on-street but includes an off-street section through Moore Park. The only major engineering works on the line were a new bridge over the Eastern Distributor and a tunnel under Moore Park and Anzac Parade. There will be between eight and ten new traffic light controlled intersections created along the route. Changing traffic arrangements and patterns made development of an accurate base model almost impossible.

Several changes to the design were announced in December 2014. The major changes involve revising platform lengths at all stops to support an increase in the length of the trams from 45 metres (148 ft) to 67 metres (220 ft), redesigning several stops, switching technologies for the delivery of the wire-free section and the removal of a proposed stop at World Square. It was also announced that the projected cost had increased from $1.6 billion to $2.2 billion. The government claimed the increase was due to the design modifications, but a 2016 report produced by the Audit Office of New South Wales found that the increase was largely due to TfNSW underestimating the cost of the project. In 2021, the Audit Office of New South Wales released a follow-up performance audit that found that the total cost of the project exceed $3.1 billion.

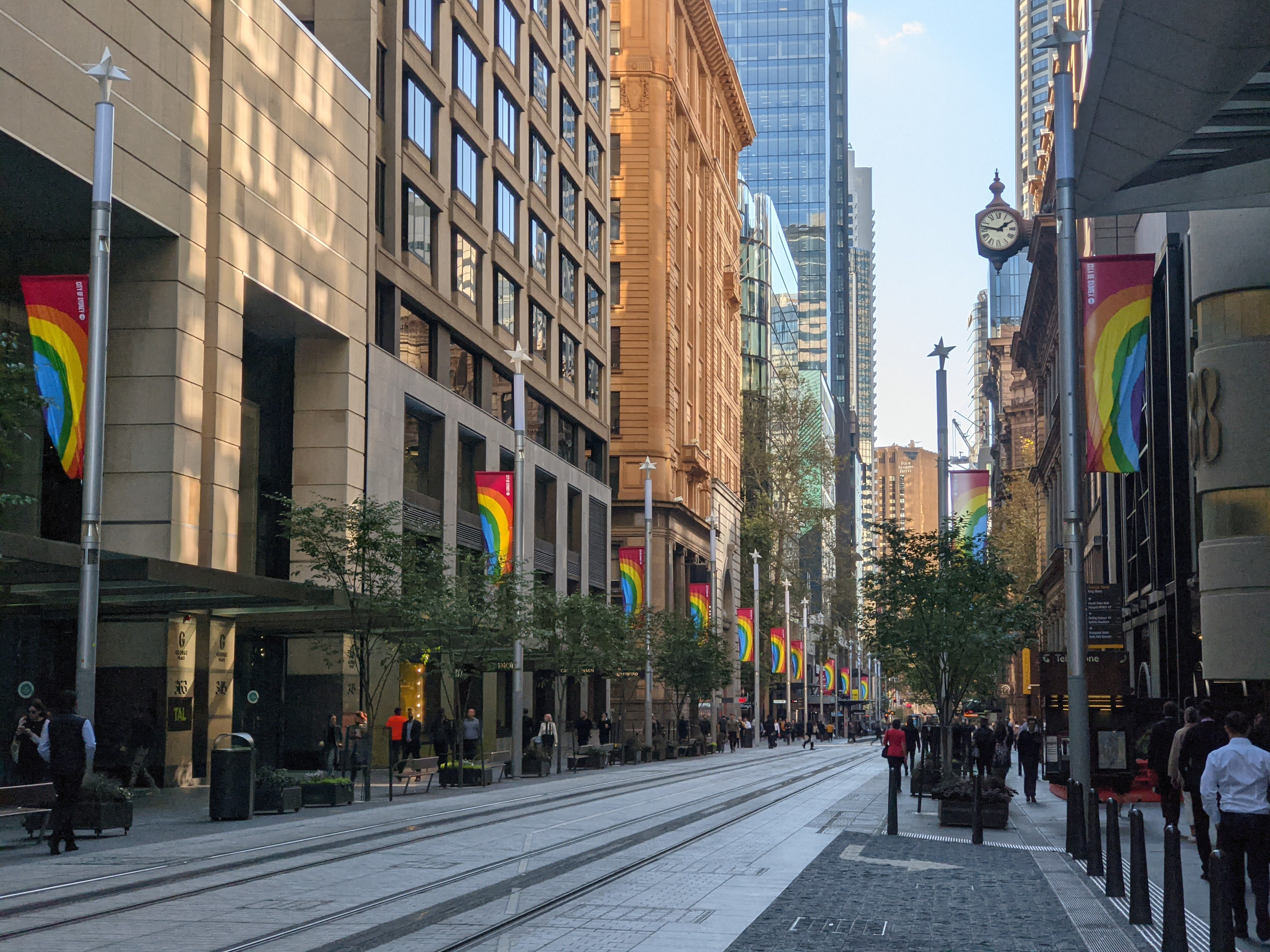
Much of George Street was pedestrianised as part of the project

A pedestrian zone was established along approximately 40% of George Street, between Bathurst and Hunter Streets. The pedestrian zone is being extended southwards to Rawson Place in Haymarket as of March 2021 (see Post-opening works).

The section between Town Hall and Circular Quay is wire-free, with trams using Alstom's proprietary APS technology to run instead. This was originally to have been achieved by equipping the trams with batteries and providing recharging facilities at stops.

The line is designed to handle special events in the Moore Park precinct and at Randwick Racecourse. Events at Moore Park were initially planned to be served using two coupled trams 90 metres (295 ft) long, with double length platforms at the Central Station and Moore Park stops. Following the decision to make all tram vehicles operate in coupled pairs with a total length of 67 metres (220 ft), the plans to build double length platforms at Central and Moore Park were abandoned, and platforms of all stops were built to be 67 metres (220 ft) long. This made the tram-sets the longest in the world under regular operation.

A depot for the trams was built at the north-western corner of Randwick Racecourse, providing stabling facilities and allowing light maintenance. Heavy maintenance is conducted at the Lilyfield Maintenance Depot at the site of the former Rozelle Yard. The maintenance depot will be accessed via the Inner West Light Rail.

A presentation was made in 2016 detailing the system engineering.

== Construction ==
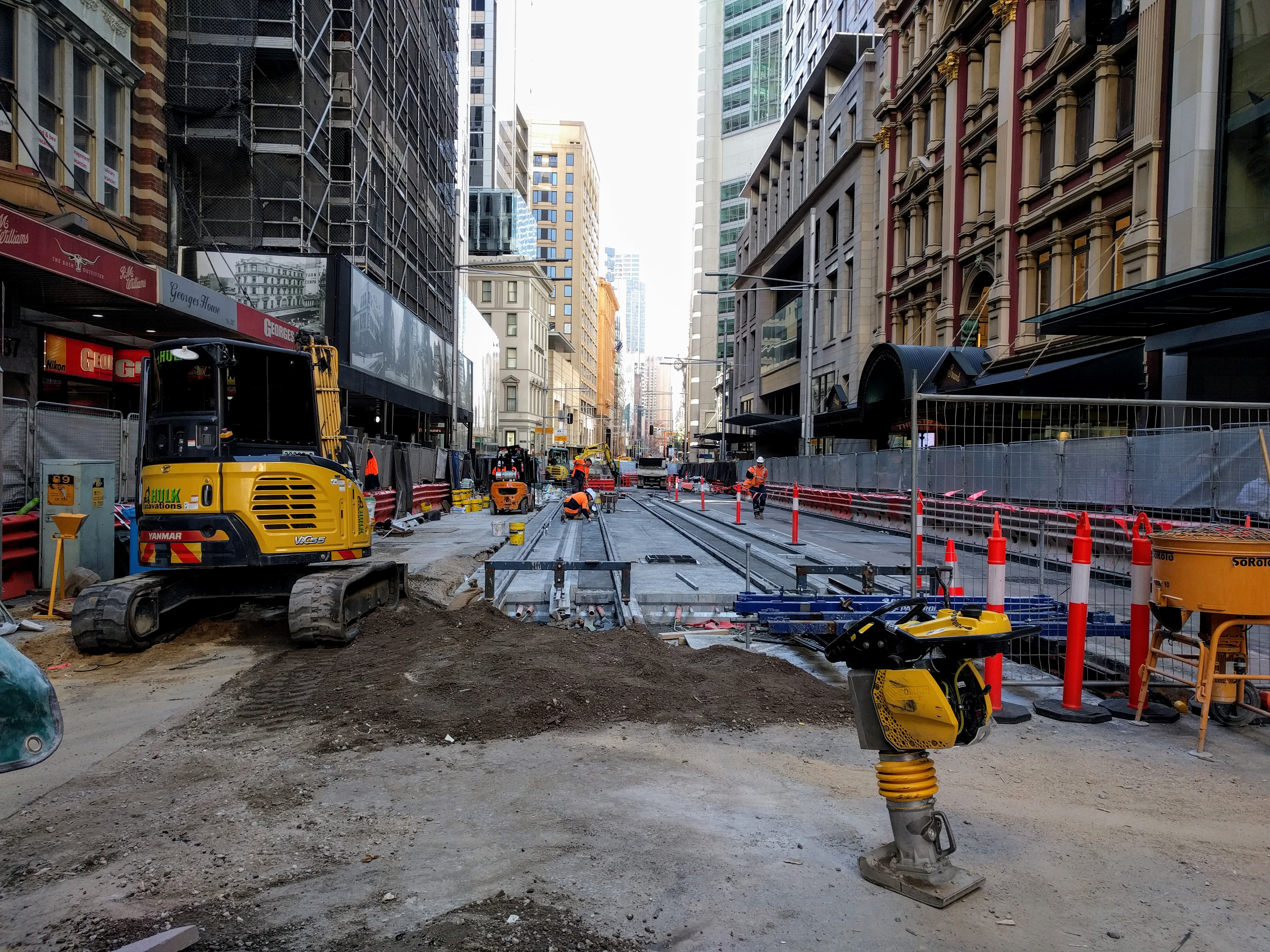
Construction work on George Street in July 2017

The line was built as a public–private partnership (PPP), with the contract covering detailed design, major construction, operation and maintenance of the line as well as the provision of rolling stock. A contract for early construction works was awarded to Laing O'Rourke in July 2014.

In February 2014, three consortia were short-listed for the main contract – covering the construction and operation of the line:

- Connecting Sydney – Acciona Infrastructure Australia, Alstom, Capella Capital & Transdev
- iLinQ – Balfour Beatty, Bombardier Transportation, Keolis Downer, Macquarie Capital & McConnell Dowell
- SydneyConnect – John Holland, Plenary Group & Serco

The iLinQ consortium withdrew after Balfour Beatty pulled out. Balfour Beatty was reportedly concerned about cost overruns for the project and falling profitability of the company as a whole.

On 23 October 2014, Connecting Sydney was announced as the preferred bidder. The contract was finalised in December 2014, when it was also announced that the consortium had been renamed ALTRAC Light Rail, and that the opening date had been brought forward to early 2019. The contract also included the operation and maintenance of the Inner West Light Rail from mid-2015.

Major construction commenced on 23 October 2015, beginning in the section of George Street between King and Market Streets. To minimise disruption along the length of the corridor, works were staggered across 31 construction zones. The first section of track in the CBD was laid in December 2016, by which time a total of 410 metres (1,350 ft) of track had already been laid across the project. This increased to around 5 kilometres (3.1 mi) of track by May 2017. By October 2017, track installation reached the halfway mark, with 12,000 metres (39,000 ft) of track laid at 23 of the 31 zones along the alignment.

=== Bus network changes ===
The CBD and South East Light Rail required significant changes to the bus networks of the Sydney central business district and the Eastern Suburbs. Prior to construction of the light rail, Hillsbus and State Transit bus routes using George Street were permanently removed from the street. The network was further redesigned when the light rail opened in 2020. Some bus routes from the Eastern Suburbs were removed from the CBD, with many of the routes integrated with the light rail interchanges at Randwick and Kingsford. Some passengers are required to change from bus to light rail to complete their journey.

To accommodate construction of the light rail on George Street, new bus timetables were introduced on 4 October 2015. Buses were diverted from George Street on to other streets in the CBD, including Elizabeth, Castlereagh, Park, Druitt, Clarence and York Streets. Some routes had their terminus changed to such places as Railway Square, Queen Victoria Building and King Street Wharf. A small number of routes were either combined so that they run through the CBD without terminating, removed from the CBD entirely or completely discontinued.

=== Delays ===
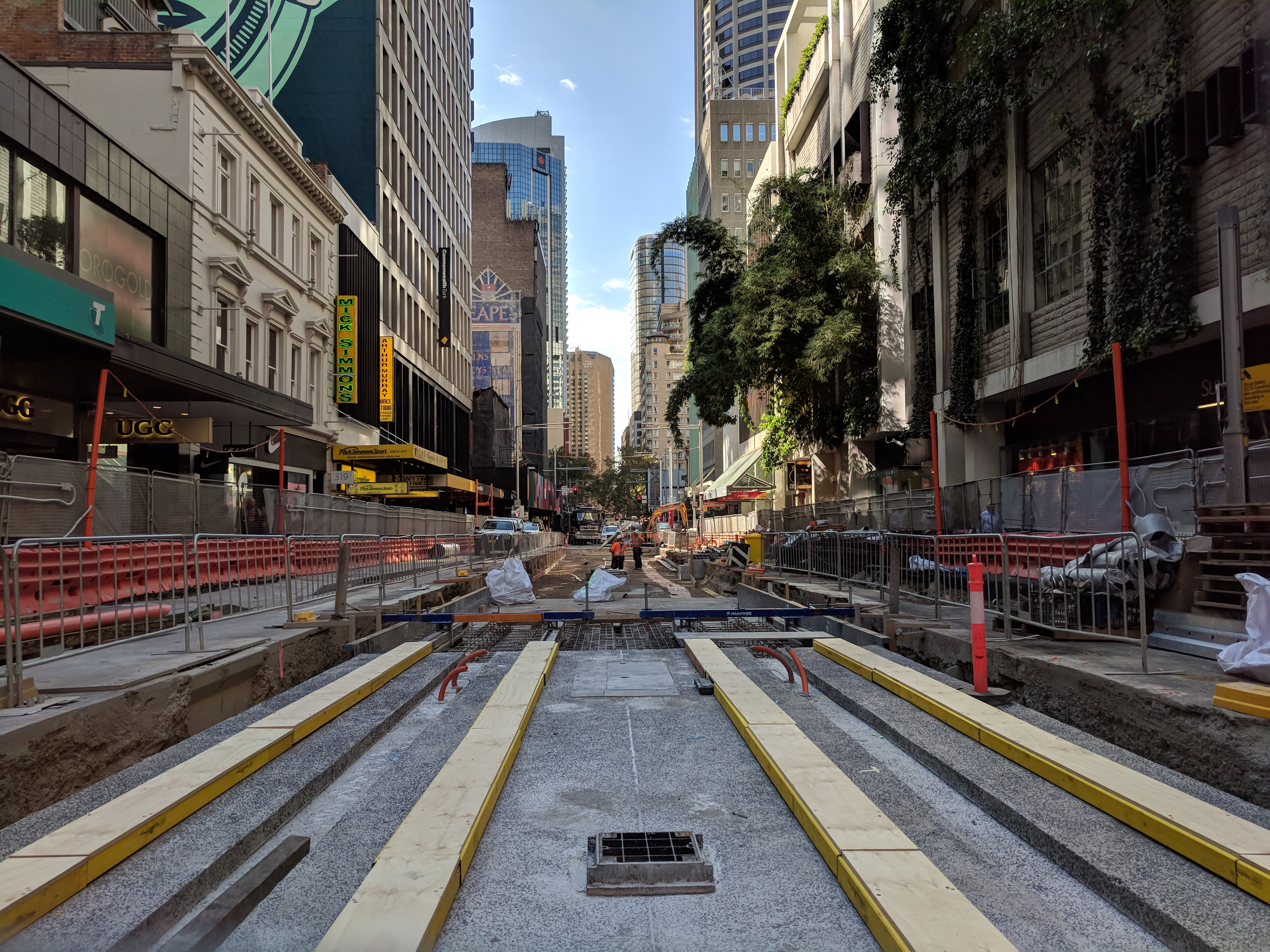
Construction work on George Street in April 2018

Construction suffered from significant delays. Major construction of the project was due to conclude in April 2018, though finishing works were to continue for some time after.

Delays at two zones in the CBD were announced in August 2016. Originally meant to be completed before Christmas 2016, construction work at these zones was to continue for several months longer than originally anticipated. The zones were eventually opened around a year after the planned completion date. Further delays to the project arose during 2016.

By the beginning of 2018 the whole project was significantly behind schedule. In March 2018 – one month before major works were originally due to be completed – the Transport Minister declined to put a date on when he expected construction of the line to be finished, but noted the government was "an unhappy customer" of the ALTRAC consortium.

The relationship between the New South Wales Government and Acciona Infrastructure – the construction company delivering the line – had deteriorated with a dispute arising between the parties over costs incurred from modifications to the line's design. Acciona commenced legal action against the government in April 2018, seeking additional payments totalling $1.2 billion. Later in the month ALTRAC told the government it was working towards a completion date of March 2020.

In October 2018, Acciona announced further delays to the project, stating that it would not be completed until May 2020.

In June 2019, TfNSW and ALTRAC (including Acciona) reached an agreement to resolve their commercial issues and legal claims. As part of the agreement, the PPP was extended to 2036, with the government to pay up to $576 million over the duration of an extended PPP term, and ALTRAC shareholders to invest additional equity into the project to meet costs. The settlement package resolved over $1.5 billion of legal claims between TfNSW and ALTRAC, and Acciona withdrew its $1.1 billion legal misrepresentation claim against the government. The agreement also included milestone and incentive payments for light rail services to commence in two stages, with target start dates of December 2019 between Randwick and Circular Quay, and March 2020 between Kingsford and Circular Quay.

=== Associated works ===
Separate to the light rail budget, Randwick City Council earmarked $68 million to partially mitigate the impacts of the light rail. Projects include replacing some of the car parking spaces that were lost, especially in Kingsford, works to improve traffic flow in the district and public domain works.

The City of Sydney planned to provide $220 million towards the light rail project. This would include money for public domain works on George Street and surrounding laneways. The centrepiece of these works was to be a large arch structure known as Cloud Arch located outside the Sydney Town Hall, however it was cancelled in late 2018 after cost blowouts. Cloud Arch would have acted as a gateway to the pedestrian section of George Street, with trams passing underneath it.

=== Testing ===
In February 2018, testing of the line commenced on a short section of the Randwick branch along Alison Road. Testing along the rest of the Randwick branch and the main line to Circular Quay was achieved in August 2019, while the Kingsford branch, which opened three months later than the rest of the line, commenced testing in October 2019.

=== Criticism ===
There have been criticism of the project from some parties:

- Action for Public Transport, that it will not have sufficient capacity to replace the bus routes eliminated
- Save Our Suburbs, that it will disrupt vehicular traffic
- Save Randwick's Trees objecting to the loss of nearly 1,000 trees including from Centennial, Moore and High Cross parks
- Save Our Park campaigning against the loss of Centennial, Moore and adjacent park lands
- Business owner Angela Vithoulkas was at the forefront of campaigns to compensate businesses impeded by construction

== Opening ==
Plaque at Circular Quay

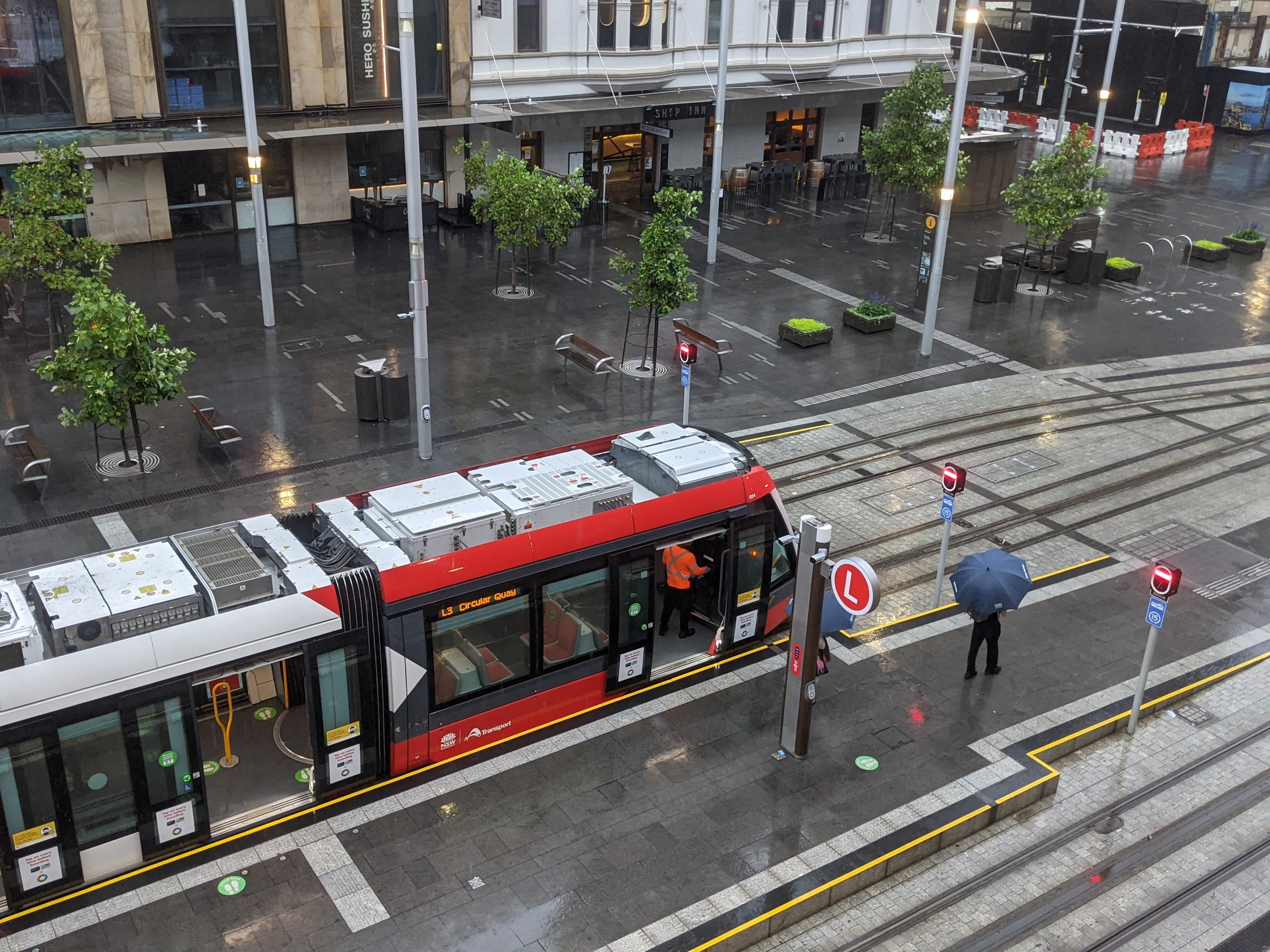
A terminating tram at Circular Quay

The first L2 passenger service between Circular Quay and Randwick commenced just after 10:00 on 14 December 2019. The opening weekend (14 and 15 December 2019) was fare-free, and 115,000 people used the new tram service during the opening weekend. The launch of the service on 14 December was interrupted by a tram which broke down at Circular Quay around 14:30 in the afternoon, within hours of the official opening ceremony. Services were restored by 15:30.

L3 passenger services between Circular Quay and Juniors Kingsford commenced operations on 3 April 2020, opening quietly amidst the prioritisation of government aid for the ongoing coronavirus pandemic during the period. Prior to the opening of the L3 line, additional L2 services ran between Circular Quay and Central Chalmers Street to provide the eventual frequency of light rail services in the CBD. With the opening of the Kingsford branch, services were extended beyond Central Chalmers Street towards Juniors Kingsford as L3 services.

=== Bus network changes ===
The project's Environmental Impact Statement (EIS) released in 2013 proposed a redesigned bus network in the CBD and the Eastern Suburbs. Some bus routes which were diverted from George Street to other streets during the construction, were proposed to terminate at Railway Square with their passengers to join the Light Rail while others will be rerouted permanently to the streets to which they were diverted.

In December 2021, bus services in the Eastern Suburbs were restructured. Many services were curtailed to terminate at Randwick and Kingsford.

=== Post-opening works ===
Following the completion of light rail, the southbound lane of George Street from Bathurst Street to Campbell Street was never reopened to traffic. In May 2020, City of Sydney proposed to convert the southern section of George Street (Bathurst Street to Rawson Place) to a pedestrian-only boulevard, extending the existing boulevard southwards from Bathurst Street. These also included the narrowing of George Street to one lane per direction south of Rawson Place. The section of Devonshire Street between Chalmers Street and Elizabeth Street, which was also never reopened to traffic, was also proposed to be converted to a pedestrian boulevard. In July 2020, the northbound lane from Ultimo Street to Bathurst Street and the southbound lane from Campbell Street to Rawson Place was temporarily closed to traffic in preparation for a conversion in the future.

Community consultation was undertaken between September and October 2020. The proposed conversions of George Street and Devonshire Street were approved in the Council meeting in December 2020. Works on George Street began on the east side of the light rail tracks near Bathurst Street in March 2021, and would progress south on both sides towards Railway Square, with works south of Goulburn Street to begin in late 2021 Works on Devonshire Street would begin in 2022. The section between Bathurst Street and Goulburn Street was completed in September 2021.

Separate to the pedestrian boulevard works, the traffic lights at the intersection of Devonshire Street and Marlborough Street east of the Surry Hills stop were removed in February 2021. Right turn bans were also introduced from Devonshire Street to Crown Street in both directions. These were in response to a number of high risk safety incidents and complaints for long waiting times for pedestrians, trams, buses and motor vehicles.

== Operation ==
As a member of the ALTRAC Light Rail consortium, Transdev will operate the line until the end of the PPP, set to end at 2036. Services on the Randwick branch are numbered L2 and services on the Kingsford branch are numbered L3. In September 2024 John Laing Group increased its shareholding in ALTRAC from 32.5% to 95% after purchasing Aware Super's 62.5% stake.

=== Fleet ===
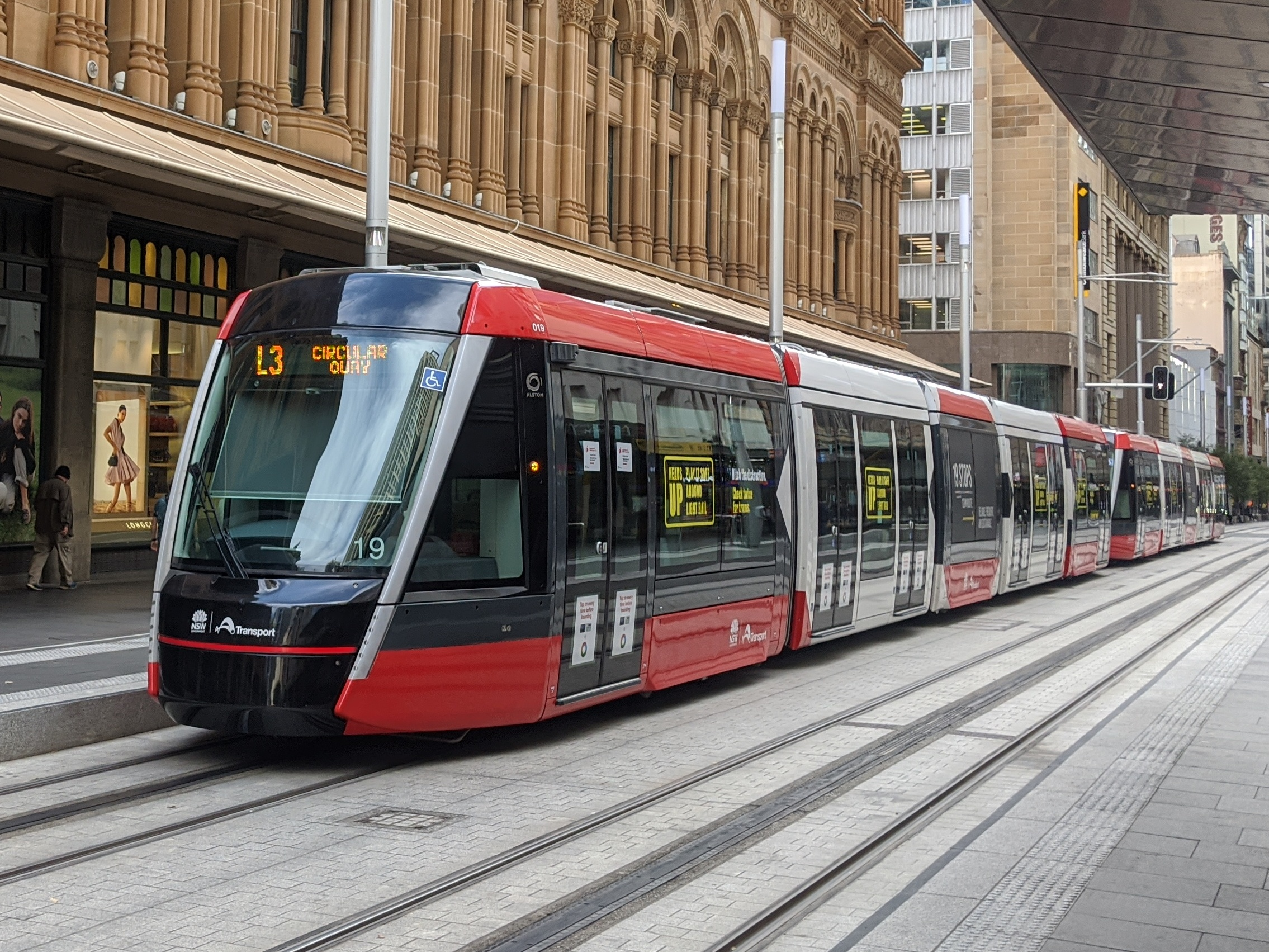
Alstom Citadis 305

The service is operated by 60 five-section Alstom Citadis 305 trams operating in coupled pairs. The first was completed in May 2017, arriving at the Randwick depot on 28 July 2017.

=== Patronage ===
2025-26 Sydney light rail patronage by line (Note: Figures based on Opal tap on and tap off data.)
Inner West Light Rail	9,105,671
CBD and South East Light Rail	16,253,187
CBD and South East Light Rail	16,928,200
Parramatta Light Rail	4,239,605

== Route ==
The line commences outside Circular Quay station heading west on Alfred Street, before proceeding south down George Street, then east via Rawson Place and Eddy Avenue, and south via Chalmers Street to Central station. It then continues east via Devonshire Street over the Eastern Distributor and under Moore Park and Anzac Parade via a tunnel before heading south via the former bus right of way. At the intersection of Anzac Parade and Alison Road, the line splits into two branches, L3 continues down Anzac Parade to terminate outside the South Sydney Junior Rugby League Club at Kingsford, and the L2 branch goes to Randwick via Alison Road, Wansey Road and High Street.

== Stops ==
The line includes the following stops:

=== Circular Quay ===
Transfer
Circular Quay railway station Circular Quay ferry wharf Circular Quay bus routes
Location
33°51′41.74″S 151°12′35.52″E

The Circular Quay stop serves the locality of Circular Quay at the northern end of the Central Business District. The stop is on Alfred St between Pitt and Loftus Streets. The area has an established role as a transport interchange and is already served by buses, trains and ferries. The stop comprises one island platform and one side platform.

=== Bridge Street ===
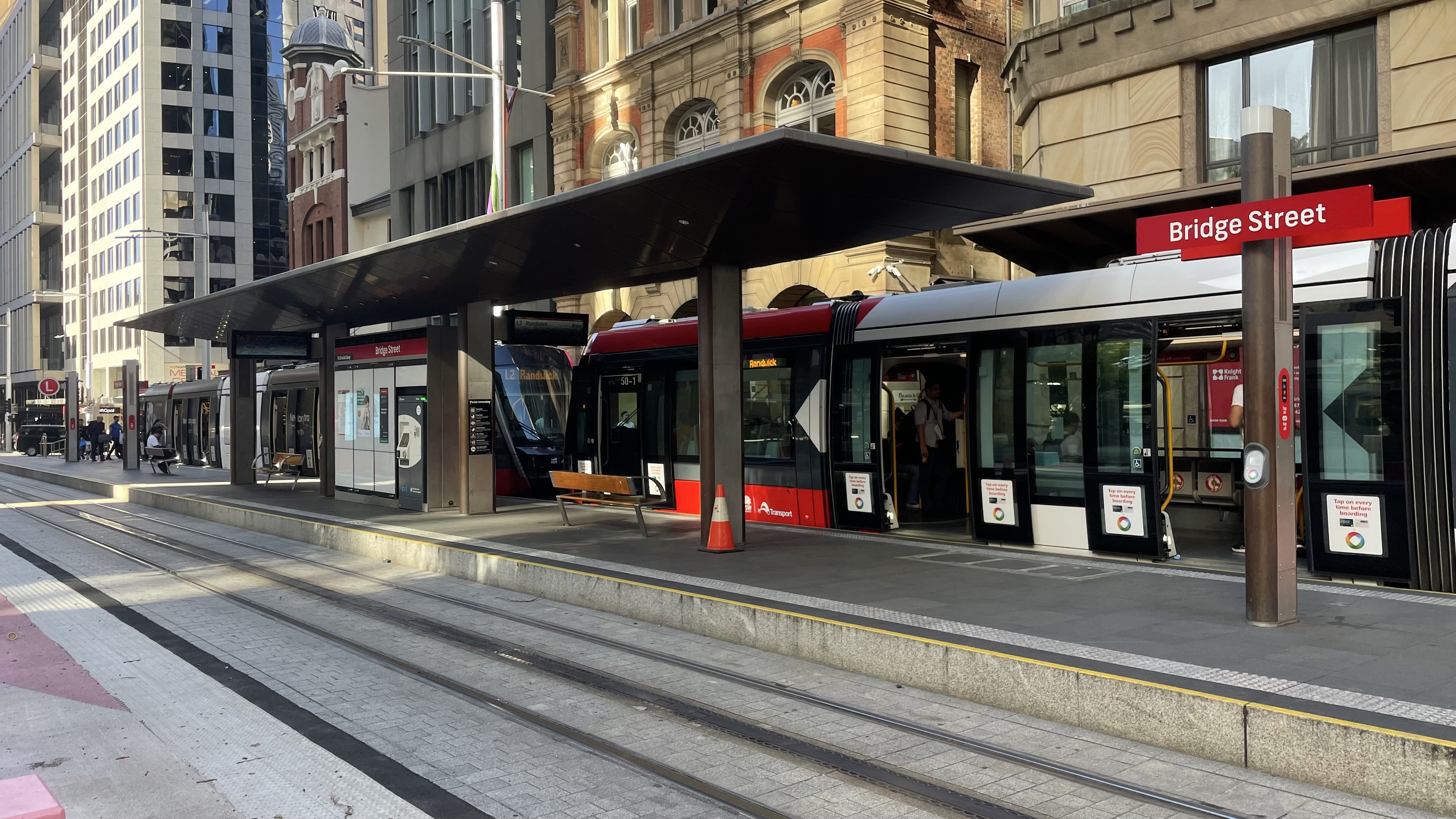
Location
33°51′50.67″S 151°12′26.79″E

The Bridge Street stop, known as Grosvenor Street during development, is located on George Street, near the intersections with Bridge Street and Grosvenor Street. The design includes an island platform. The design originally included two side platforms but was switched to an island platform to retain the existing dedicated left-hand turning lane from George Street into Grosvenor Street.

=== Wynyard ===
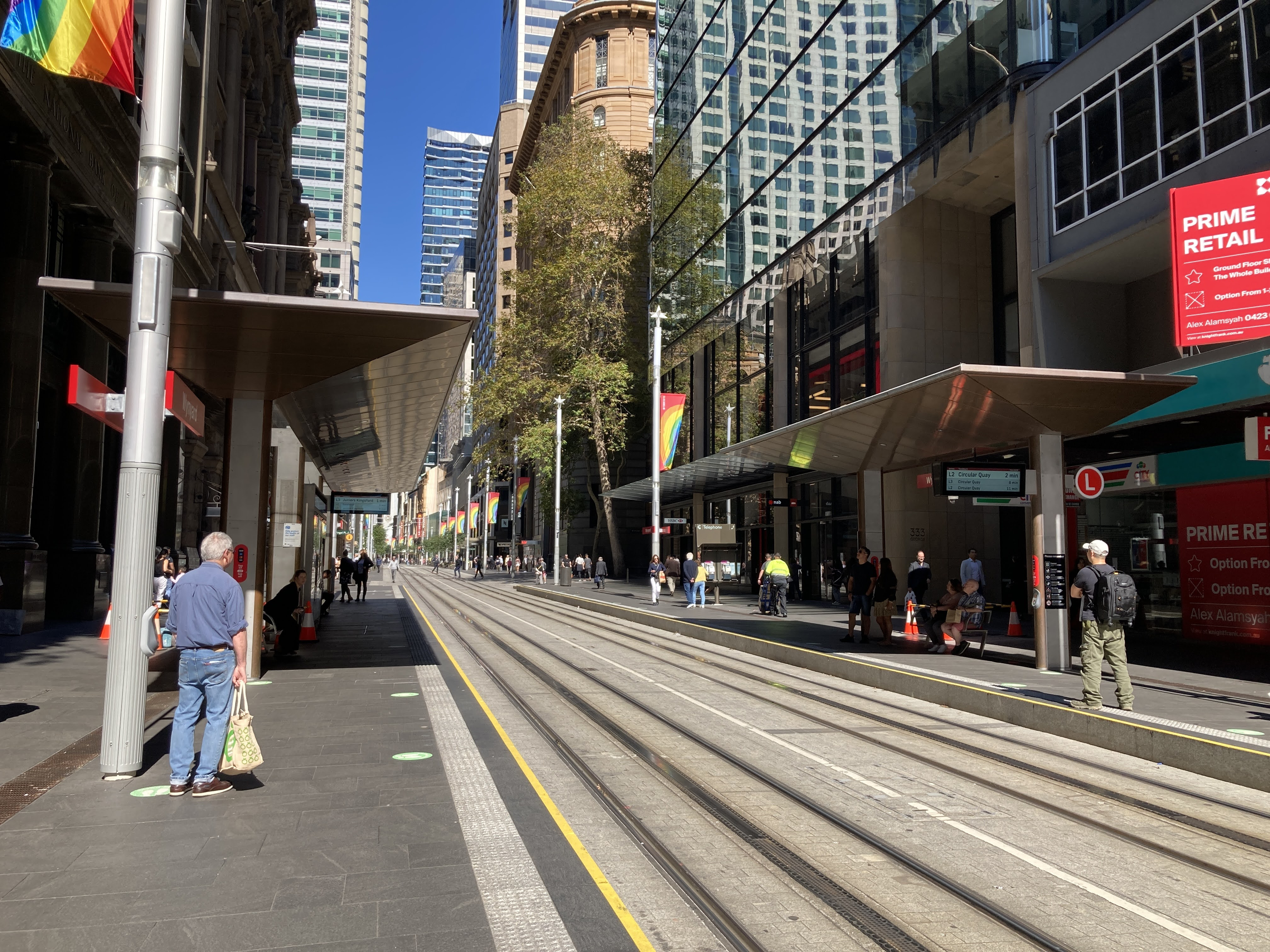
Transfer
Wynyard railway station
Wynyard Park bus routes
Location
33°51′58.37″S 151°12′26.15″E

The Wynyard stop serves the locality of Wynyard. The stop is located at the northern end of the George Street pedestrian zone, adjacent to the entrance to Wynyard railway station. The design includes two side platforms.

=== QVB ===
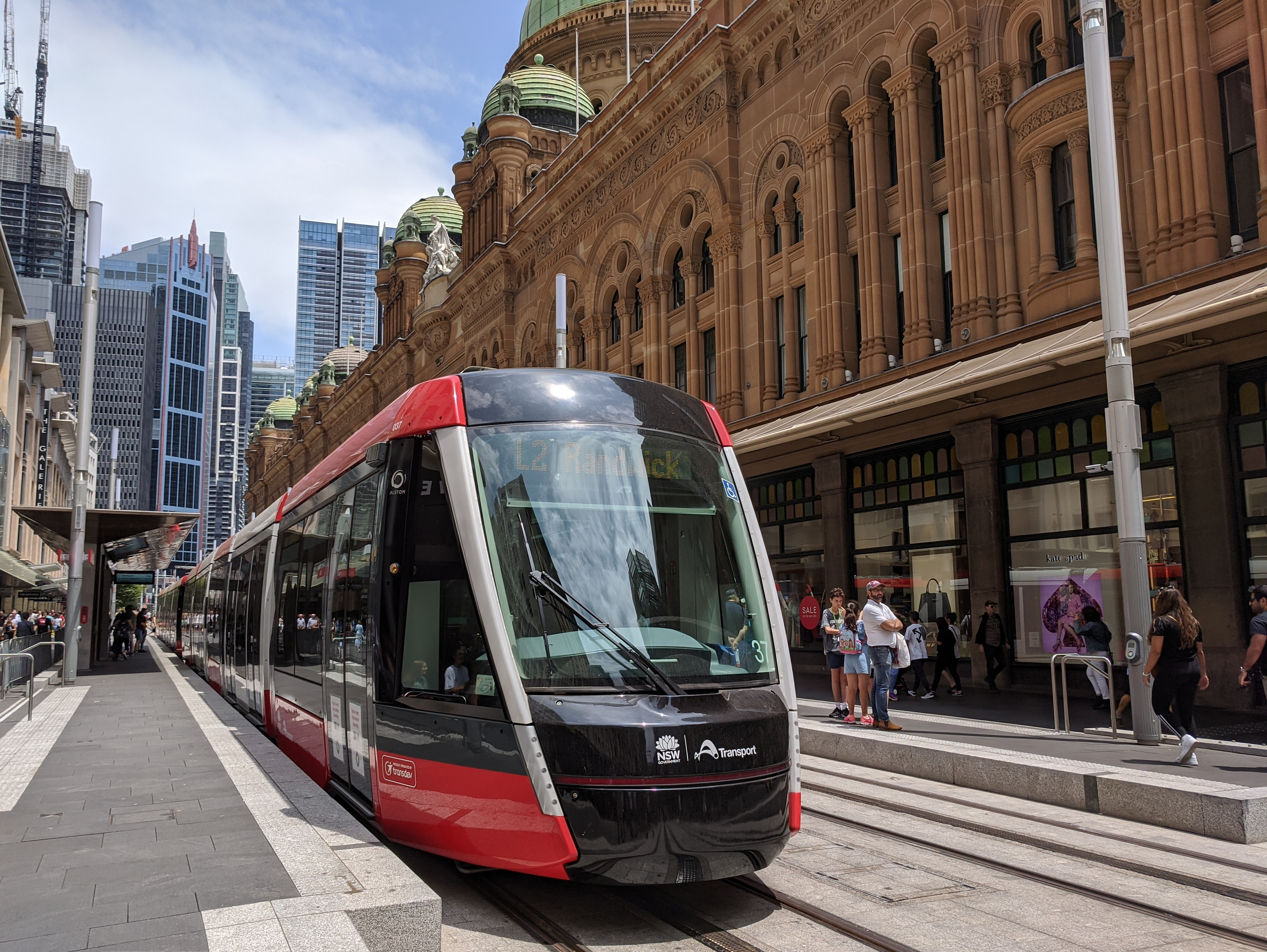
Transfer
Bus
Location
33°52′16.68″S 151°12′25.11″E

The QVB stop, known as Queen Victoria Building during development, is located on George Street south of Market Street and adjacent to the Queen Victoria Building (often abbreviated QVB), a shopping centre from which the stop takes its name. The design includes two side platforms.

=== Town Hall ===
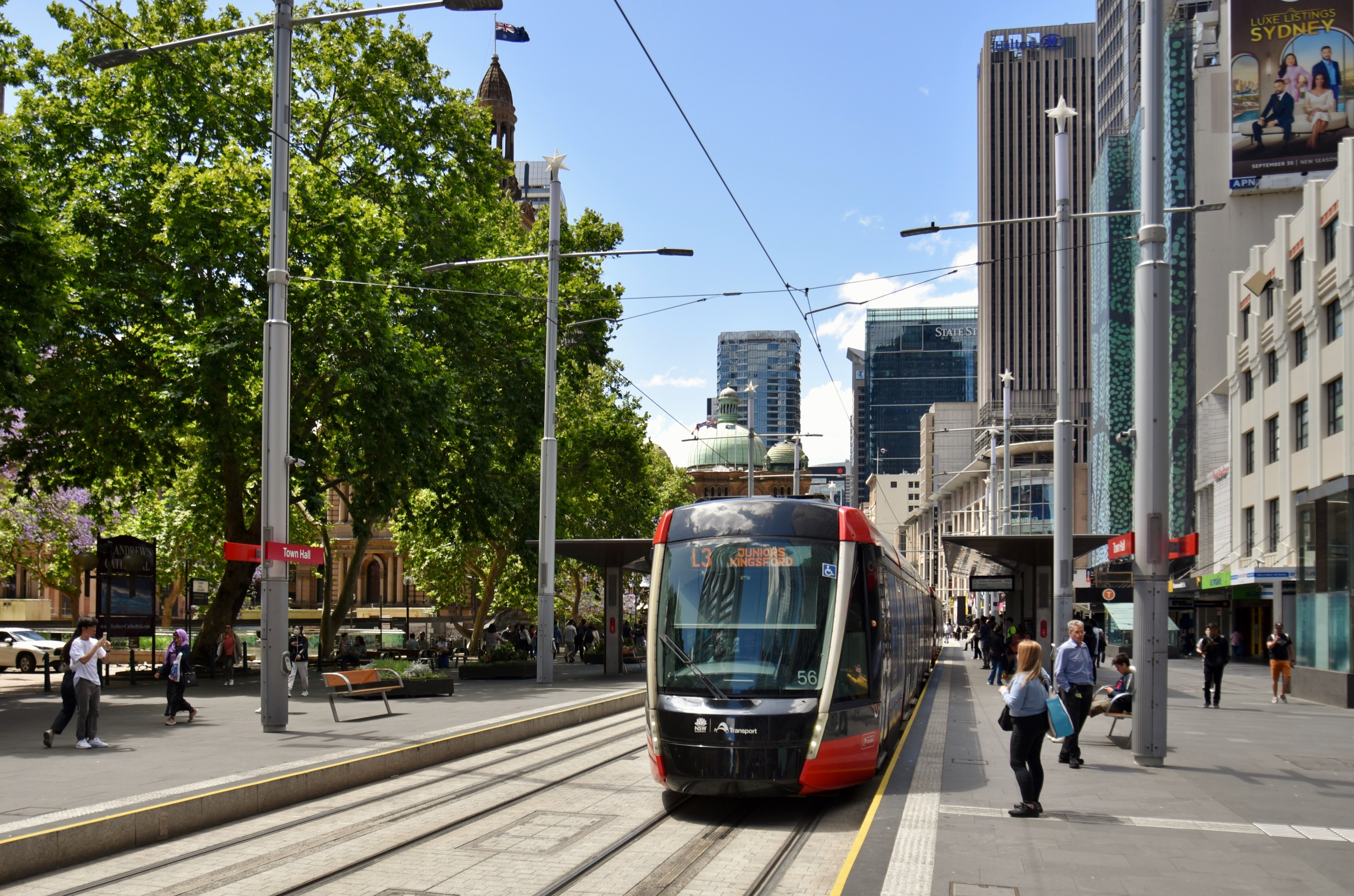
Transfer
Town Hall railway station, Bus
Location
33°52′26.28″S 151°12′24.74″E

The Town Hall stop is located at the southern end of the George Street pedestrian zone, adjacent to St Andrew's Cathedral. It is named after Town Hall railway station and the Sydney Town Hall. The stop consists of two side platforms.

=== Chinatown ===
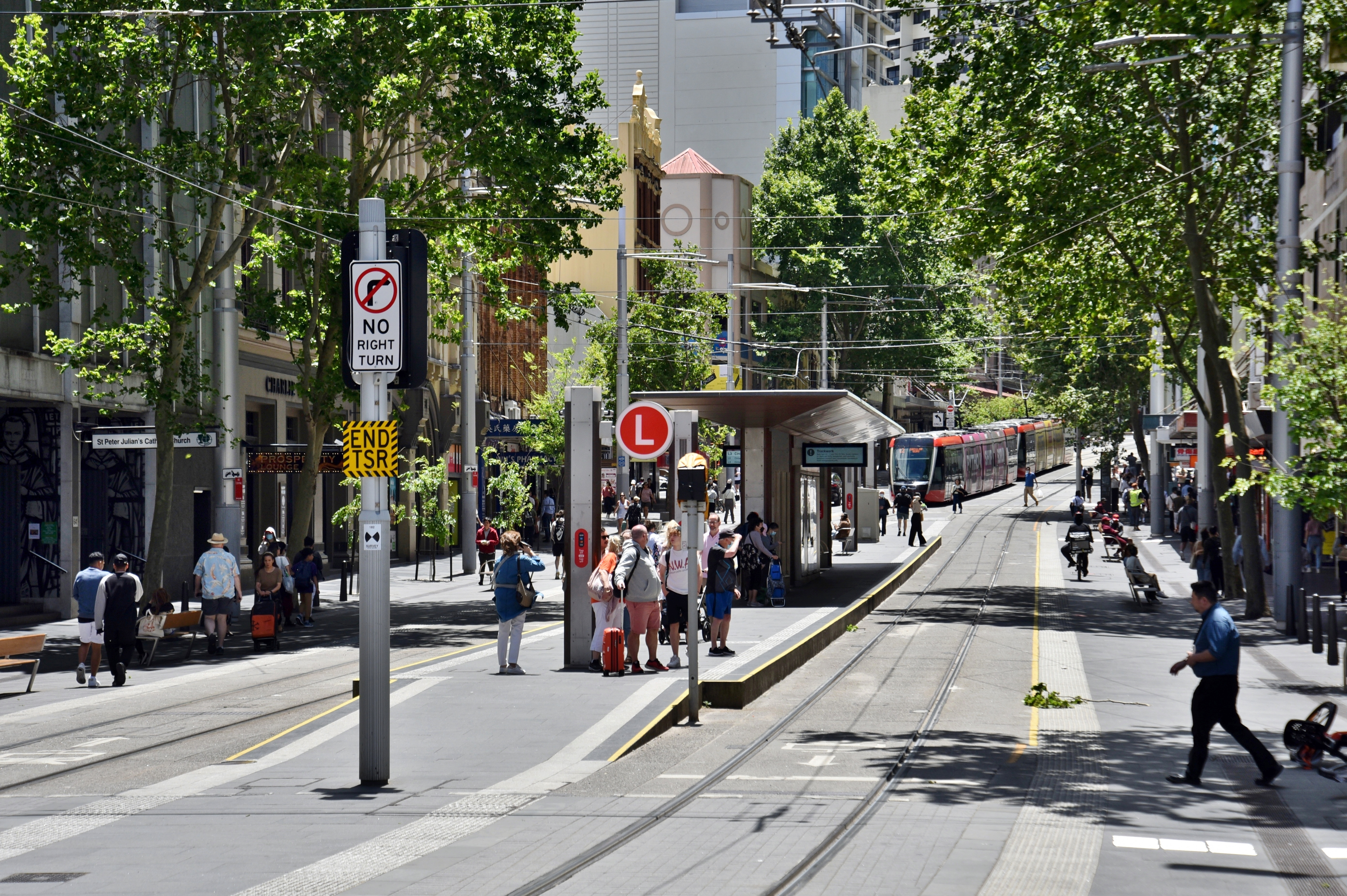
Transfer
L1 Dulwich Hill Line at Capitol Square stop
Location
33°52′43.49″S 151°12′20.01″E

The Chinatown stop is located on George Street, north of Campbell Street. It is named after Sydney's Chinatown precinct. The Capitol Square stop on the Inner West Light Rail is nearby. The design was to include two side platforms, but was changed to an island platform in the project's Submissions Report. The location was also moved 15 metres (49 ft) north.

=== Haymarket ===
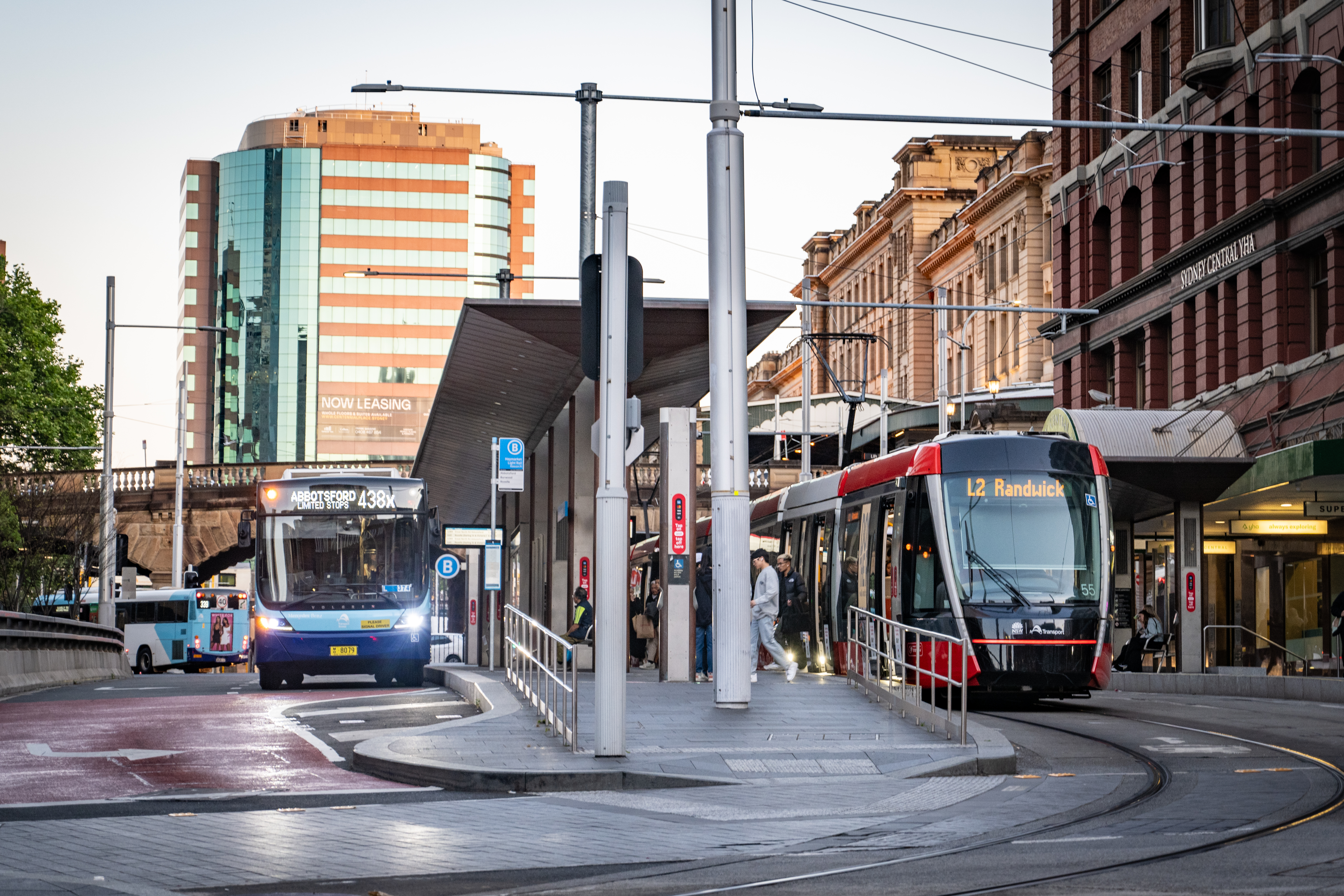
Transfer
Bus routes 438X, 440 & 461X (westbound only on the adjacent platform)
Location
33°52′53.51″S 151°12′20.18″E

The Haymarket stop, known as Rawson Place during development, serves as an interchange for buses heading towards the west via Broadway. The design includes two side platforms for trams and an adjacent platform for buses, which allows bus – tram cross-platform transfers.

=== Central Chalmers Street ===
Transfer
Central railway station, Bus
Location
33°53′5.31″S 151°12′25.94″E

The Central Chalmers Street stop is located on Chalmers Street, serving the eastern side of the Central railway station precinct. The stop was originally known as Central during development, but was renamed to distinguish it from the existing Central stop on the Inner West Light Rail at the station's Grand Concourse.
Map of Central station

=== Surry Hills ===
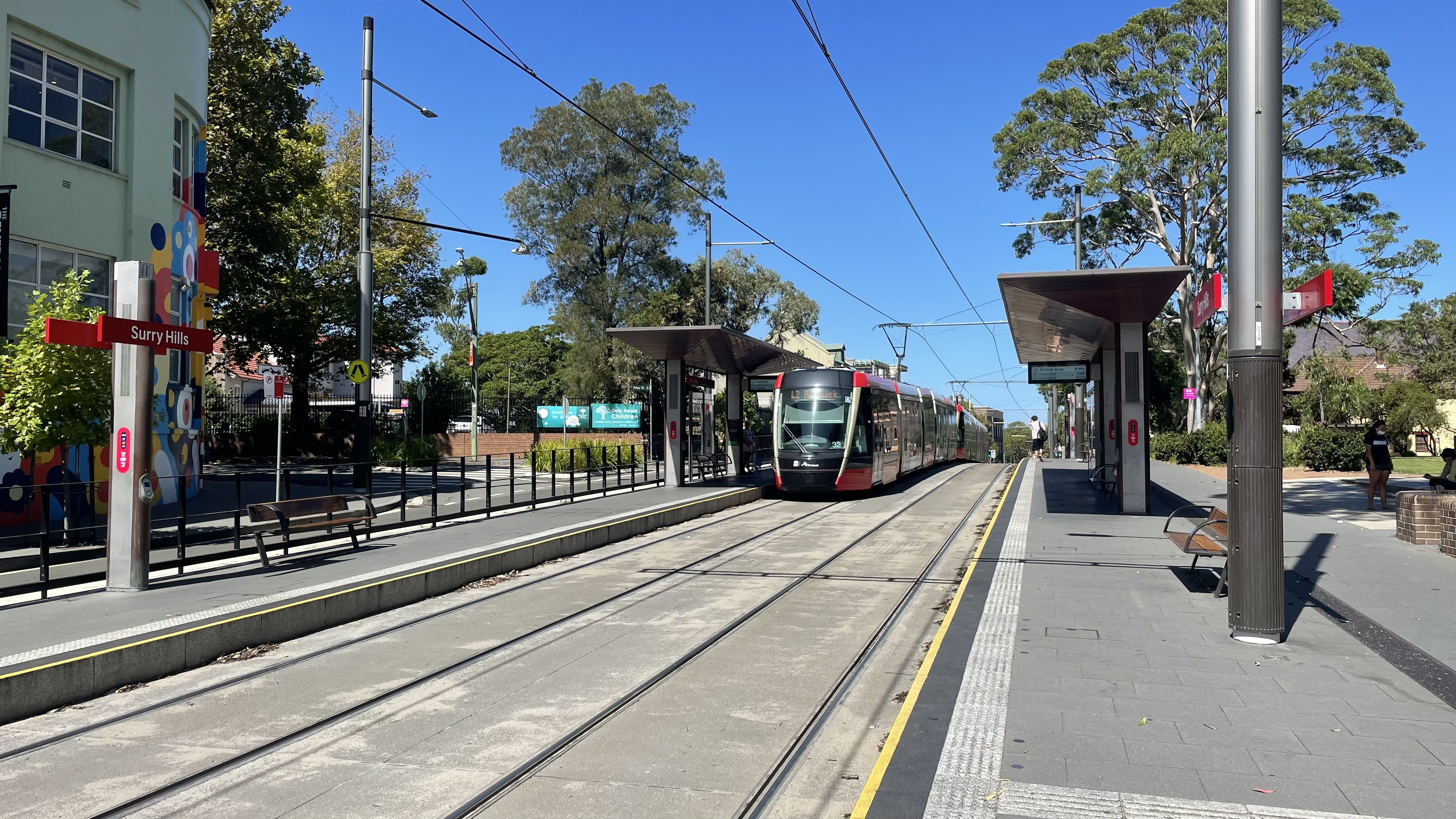
Transfer
Bus
Location
33°53′17.32″S 151°12′43.09″E

The Surry Hills stop is located on Devonshire Street, adjacent to Ward Park in Surry Hills. The design originally featured an island platform but was changed to side platforms in the project's Submissions Report. Groundwork for a second Surry Hills stop at Wimbo Park for a potential future station if required will be completed in the initial construction phase.

=== Moore Park ===
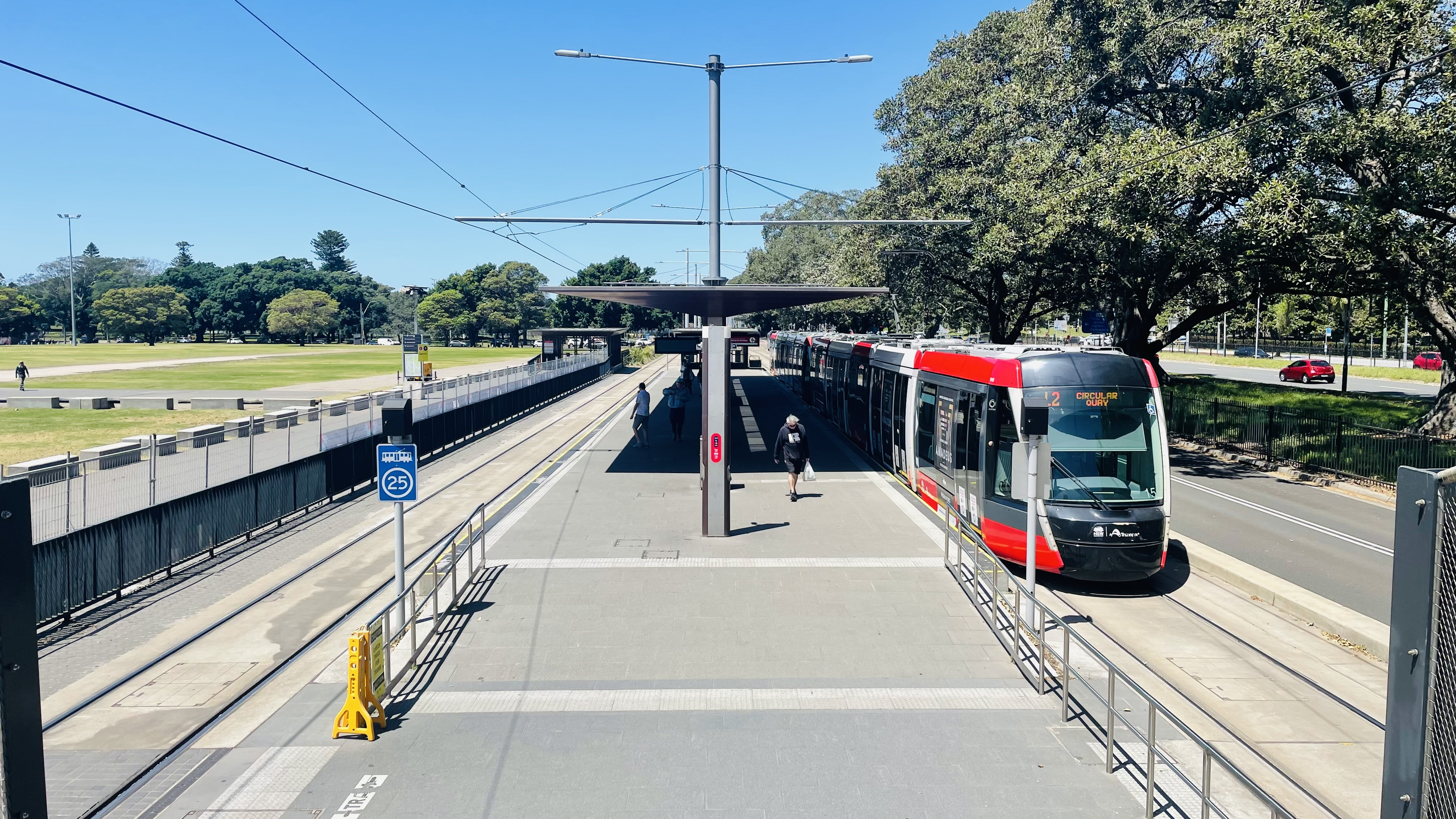
Location
33°53′36.07″S 151°13′18.2″E

The Moore Park stop serves the Moore Park precinct, including Sydney Boys High School, Sydney Girls High School and The Entertainment Quarter. The stop is also designed to handle major events at the Sydney Football Stadium and Sydney Cricket Ground, with access to the platform via a footbridge. As well as this, at-grade access to the stop is provided for regular use and for disabled passengers during major events.

=== Royal Randwick ===
Branch
L2
Transfer
Bus
Location
33.905717°S 151.229976°E

The Royal Randwick stop, known as Alison Road and then Royal Randwick Racecourse during development, is located on existing park land adjacent to Centennial Park on Alison Road, opposite the racecourse. This required the construction of a new retaining wall approximately 200 metres (656 ft) long and 3 metres (9 ft 10 in) high together with increasing the height of an existing 1,100-metre (3,609 ft) long levee by up to 300 millimetres (12 in) and the removal of approximately 50 established trees.

The design features an island platform. The proposed location was switched from the south side to the north side of Alison Road in December 2014. This is intended to reduce impacts on the racecourse, improve bus access during major events and provide better access to the nearby Centennial Park and Randwick TAFE. This change includes the removal of right turn access from Alison Road into Darley Road.

=== Wansey Road ===
Branch
L2
Location
33°54′41.62″S 151°14′8.08″E

The Wansey Road stop is located on Alison Road, adjacent to the intersection with Wansey Road. The design features an island platform and was originally to be located on Wansey Road itself, but was moved to Alison Road in the project's Submissions Report. The stop was originally proposed to be named Wansey Stables.

=== UNSW High Street ===
Branch
L2
Location
33°54′57.32″S 151°14′4.91″E

The UNSW High Street stop serves the upper campus of the University of New South Wales. It was to have been located at the southern end of Wansey Road, adjacent to High Street, but was moved onto High Street itself as part of the project's Submissions Report. As part of the changes to the Randwick stop, the design was changed from an island platform to two side platforms.

=== Randwick ===
Branch
L2
Transfer
Bus
Location
33.917170°S 151.240978°E

The Randwick stop is located at the eastern end of High Street in Randwick. The stop was originally proposed to be named Randwick Junction. The design features an island platform.

=== ES Marks ===
Branch
L3
Location
33°54′21.15″S 151°13′26.09″E

The ES Marks stop, known as Carlton Street during development, is located on Anzac Parade south of the intersection with Carlton Street. The stop will serve a residential area. It is named after the nearby ES Marks Athletics Field. The design features an island platform.

=== Kensington ===
Branch
L3
Location
33°54′34.96″S 151°13′23.97″E

The Kensington stop, known as Todman Avenue during development, is located on Anzac Parade north of the intersection with Todman Avenue. The stop serves a residential area and a shopping strip on Anzac Parade in the suburb of Kensington. The design features an island platform.

=== UNSW Anzac Parade ===
Branch
L3
Transfer
Bus
Location
33°55′0.59″S 151°13′34.19″E

The UNSW Anzac Parade stop serves the lower campus of the University of New South Wales and the National Institute of Dramatic Art. The design includes an island platform in the centre of Anzac Parade, north of the University Mall.

The stop was to be located on the eastern side of Anzac Parade and include one island platform and one side platform – though only two tracks. In the project's Submissions Report, the side platform was removed and the stop was moved to the centre of Anzac Parade.

=== Kingsford ===
Branch
L3
Location
33°55′17.82″S 151°13′36.62″E

The Kingsford stop, known as Strachan Street during development, is located on Anzac Parade to the south of the intersection of Strachan Street and Middle Street in Kingsford. The stop serves a residential area and a shopping strip on Anzac Parade. The design features an island platform.

=== Juniors Kingsford ===
Branch
L3
Transfer
Bus
Location
33°55′30.51″S 151°13′45.27″E

The Juniors Kingsford stop is located on the southern side of the Nine Ways intersection in Kingsford. The design features two island platforms with the light rail using the two outer platforms and buses using the two inner platforms, providing cross-platform transfers. Terminating facilities for trams are located south of the stop. The station was initially referred to as Nine Ways, after the major Nine Ways road intersection located immediately to the north of the station. It was subsequently known as Kingsford during development. In August 2018, Transport for NSW submitted a proposal to the Geographical Names Board for the stop to be renamed from Nine Ways to Juniors Kingsford—after the involvement of shock-jock Ray Hadley— which was approved in January 2019, despite local opposition to the commercialisation of the stop name,

The first passenger service on the line in April 2020 departed from the Juniors Kingsford at 5:00am. Due to the prioritisation of government aid for the ongoing COVID-19 pandemic, the line was opened quietly. Due to the location of Juniors Kingsford station immediately south of Nine Ways, and the light rail line running straight through the intersection, the historic roundabout was replaced with a signalised intersection in 2017.

Under the Kensington and Kingsford Town Centres Planning Proposal (K2K) published by the Randwick City Council, the light rail station is planned to form the centre of a new civic plaza named the Kingsford Junction Precinct. The precinct would act as an extension of the Kingsford town centre, and is planned to be focused around Juniors Kingsford station to ensure the precinct is "highly accessible, well connected and activated". It is planned to develop the area with residential, commercial and civic structures clustered around the light rail station so as to "[make] greater use of the public transport network". The plan also advocates the inclusion of a metro railway station to be located adjacent to the light rail station, as part of proposed Sydney Metro extensions to Maroubra.

== Incidents and accidents ==
- On 5 September 2022, a tram derailed near Haymarket stop and Central station after a firetruck collided with it while on its way to an emergency response, resulting in two injuries.
- On 11 May 2023, a 16-year old girl was killed after she was caught by and became trapped under the tram carriage near Chinatown stop after she attempted to climb over the couplers that connect the two semi-permanently coupled trams, which was the usual configuration to operate services on the L2 and L3.
- On 5 June 2025, a man was killed after being hit by a light rail vehicle in Surry Hills. Initial police inquiries indicated that the male attempted to climb over the couplers between two carriages.
- On 11th July 2026, the light rail service got suspended after smoke was detected on the roof of the two tram carriages at Surry Hills and in the CBD. A mechanical issue was also found on one of the L1 CAF Urbos 3 Vehicles on the same day causing many issues with Light Rail in Sydney.

== Potential extension ==
In 2014, TfNSW investigated an extension to the Kingsford branch along the southern Anzac Parade corridor. Three potential options were examined; a 1.9-kilometre (1.2 mi) extension to Maroubra Junction, a 5.1-kilometre (3.2 mi) extension to Malabar and an 8.2-kilometre (5.1 mi) extension to La Perouse. An extension to Maroubra Junction had the support of Randwick City Council.
