= Kingsford, New South Wales =

Kingsford
- Suburb
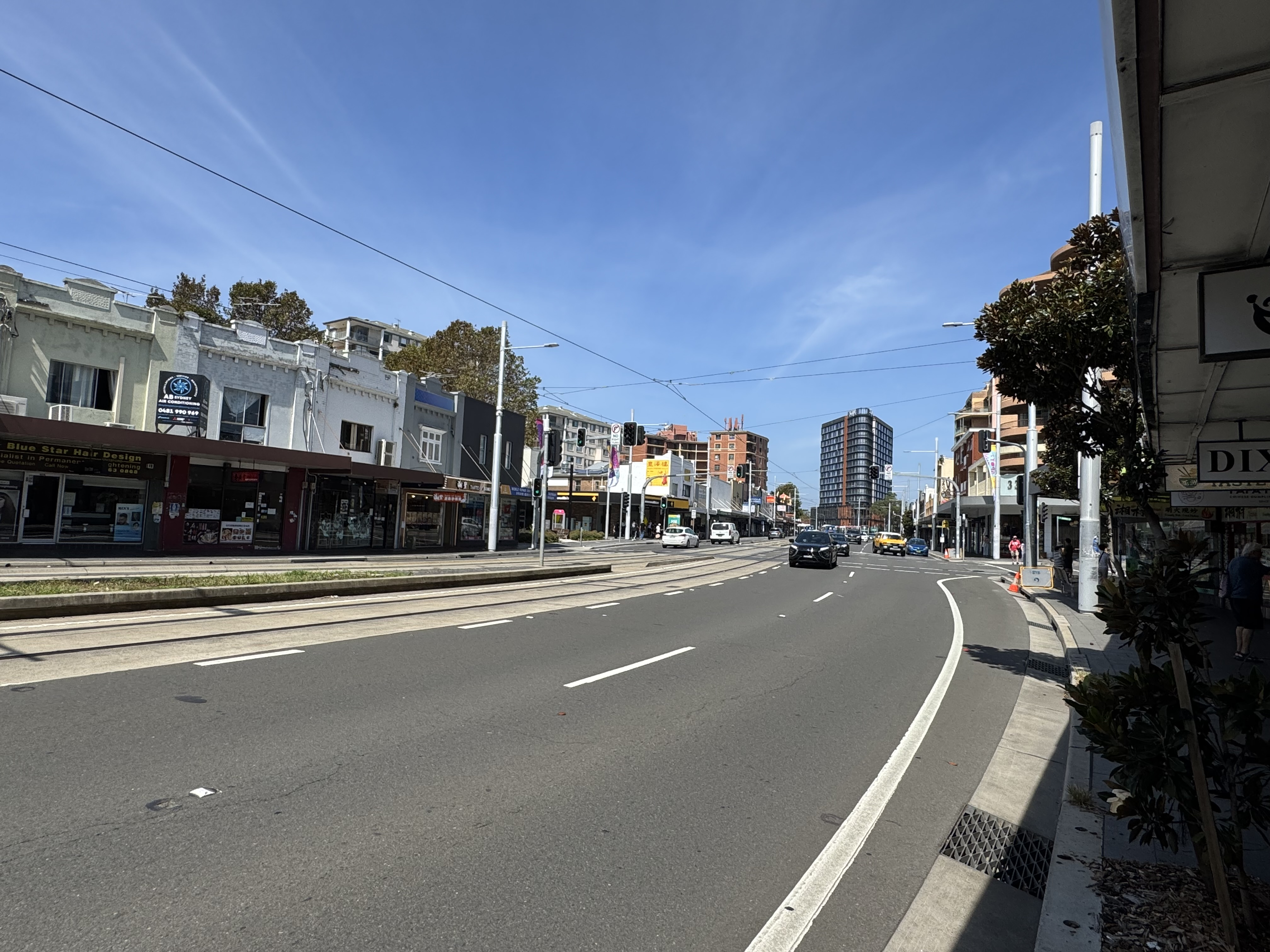
- Anzac Parade

- Interactive map of Kingsford
- Country: Australia
- State: New South Wales
- City: Sydney
- LGA: Randwick City Council
- Location: 6 km (3.7 mi) south-east of Sydney CBD

Government
  - State electorates: Heffron; Maroubra; Coogee
  - Federal division: Kingsford Smith
- Elevation: 28 m (92 ft)

Population
  - Total: 13,492 (SAL 2021)
- Postcode: 2032
Suburbs around Kingsford
Kensington	Kensington	Randwick
Rosebery	Kingsford	Randwick
Eastlakes	Daceyville	Maroubra

Kingsford is a suburb in the Eastern Suburbs of Sydney, in the state of New South Wales, Australia. Kingsford is located 6 kilometres south-east of the Sydney central business district, in the local government area of the City of Randwick.

== Location ==
Kingsford is a mainly residential area, situated directly south of the University of New South Wales, which is in Kensington. Many of the residents are students living in medium and high density housing. A large Australian Army depot lies to the east of Kingsford. Kingsford is surrounded by Daceyville and Maroubra to the south, Eastlakes to the west and Randwick to the north and east.

At the centre of Kingsford, on Anzac Parade and Gardeners Road, there was a large roundabout connecting a public transport system to nine possible destinations via a large number of bus services. For this reason, this part of Kingsford is sometimes referred to as "nine-ways". Due to construction on light rail, the roundabout has since been converted into an intersection with traffic lights.

== History ==
The area was originally known as South Kensington. In 1936 it was renamed Kingsford to honour Australian aviator Sir Charles Kingsford Smith (1897–1935), as was the nearby Sydney Airport. Kingsford was undeveloped until a land boom in the 1920s.

On 19 December 1936, the coffin of Eileen O'Connor, who was likely to become Australia's second Catholic saint, was opened in a funeral home at 347 Anzac Parade, Kingsford. The body was found to be incorrupt although Eileen had died in 1921. The body was reinterred in the Coogee home of Our Lady's Nurses for the Poor, an order which Eileen had founded.

In the 1940s, many Greeks settled in the area, particularly migrants from the island of Castellorizo (or Kastellorizo). Many opened businesses in the area; and, in 1973, they built the Castellorizian Club on Anzac Parade. Kingsford was originally intended to be the terminus of the Eastern Suburbs railway line; but, as a cost-cutting measure, the line was terminated at Bondi Junction in 1979. A new light rail project linking Kingsford to the CBD via Anzac Parade opened in April 2020.

=== Charles Kingsford Smith Tribute ===
In 2010, a tribute was created to Charles Kingsford Smith in Gardeners Lane, off Anzac Parade. The tribute consisted of a mosaic of Smith, a mosaic of his plane, the Southern Cross, and a Trans Pacific Mural depicting the Southern Cross. The tribute was unveiled on 11 August 2010 by Mayor John Procopiadis. It was designed by Masoud Nodous; the artist was Tim Cole. In 2014, the mural depicting the Southern Cross was added. The artist was Annette Barlow.

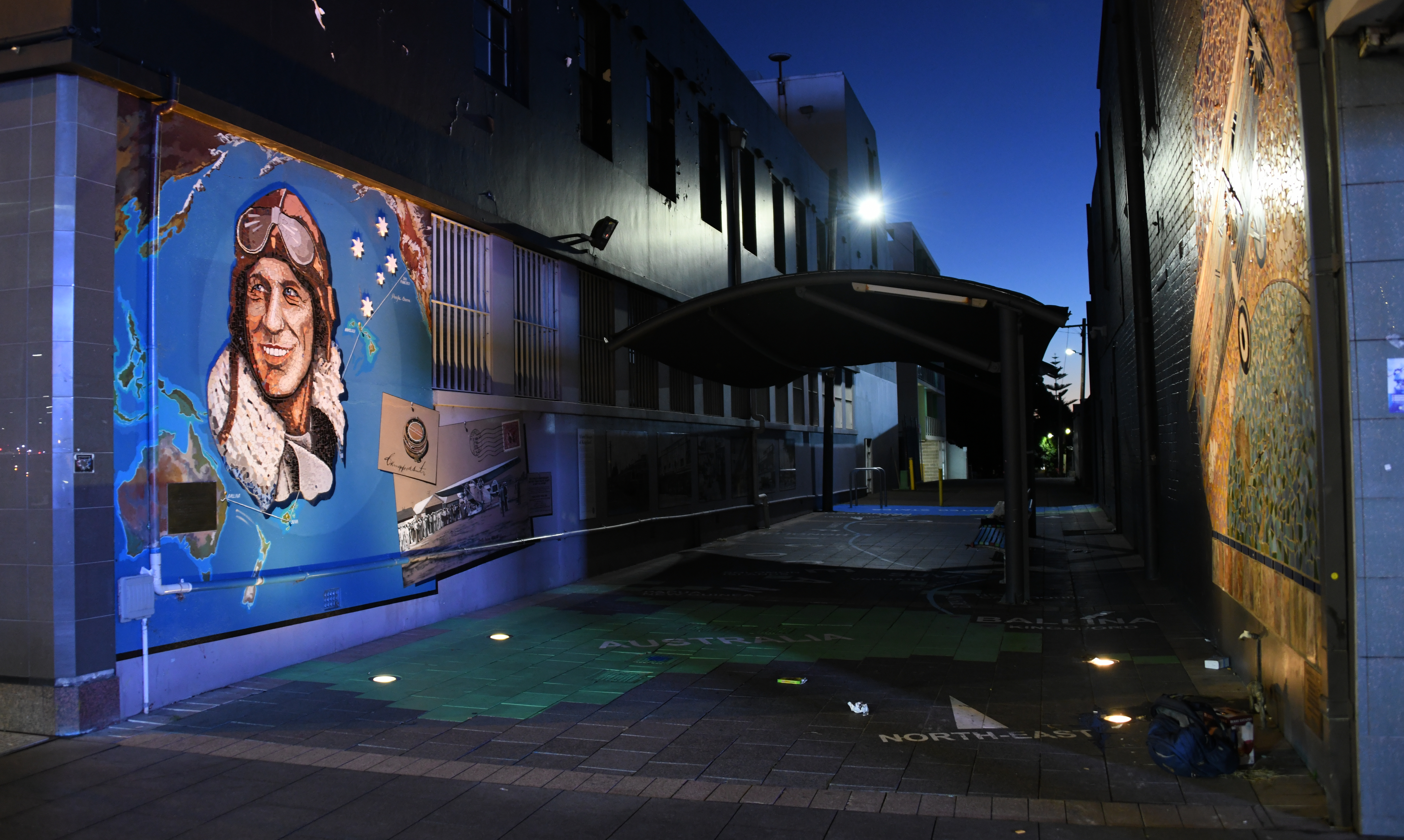
Charles Kingsford Smith Tribute, Gardeners Lane

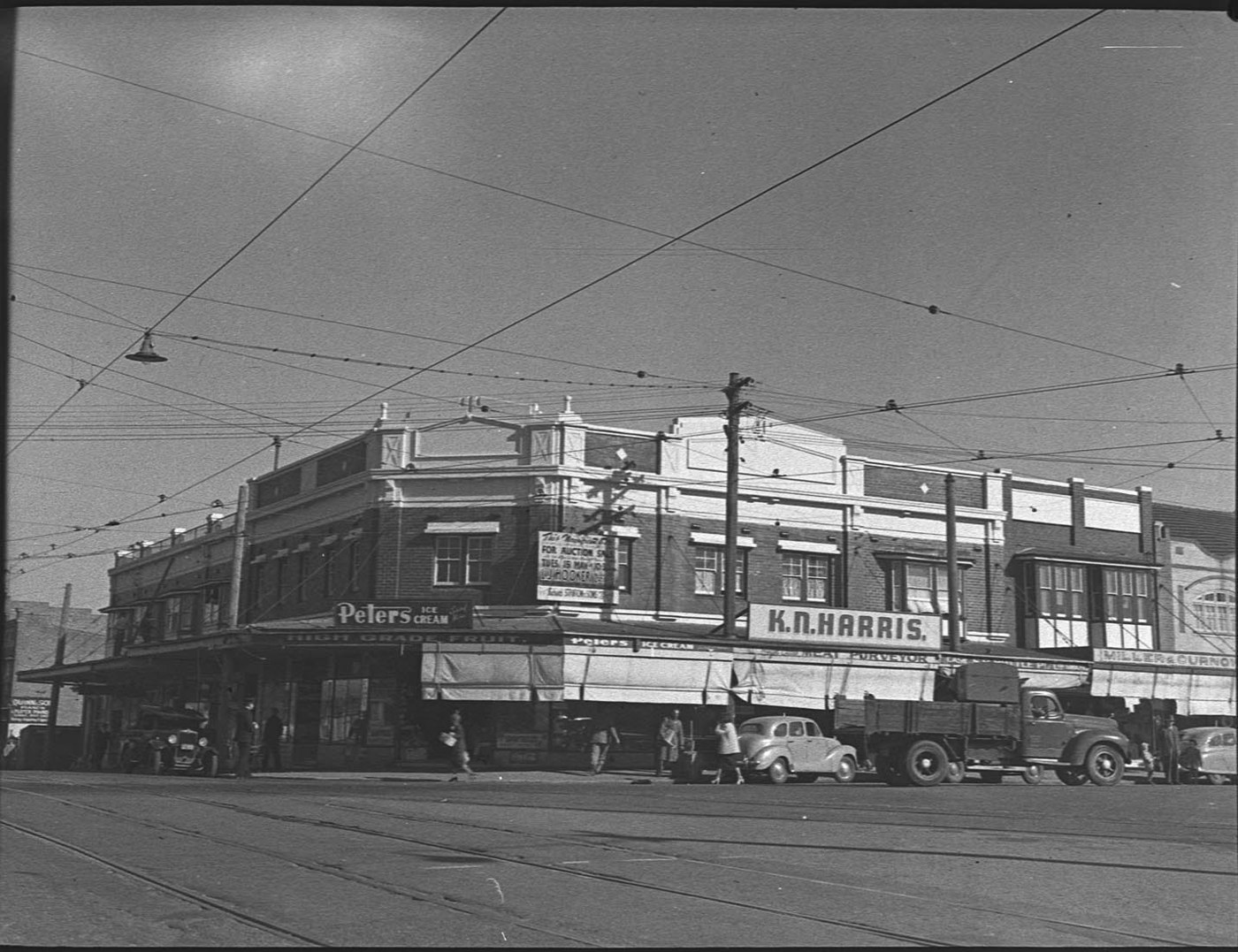
Maloneys Corner Kingsford in 1951

== Demographics ==
In the 2021 Census, there were 13,492 people in Kingsford. 46.4% of people were born in Australia. The next most common countries of birth were China 8.3%, Indonesia 4.3%, India 2.8%, England 2.8% and Malaysia 2.5%. The most common ancestries in Kingsford were Chinese 20.8%, English 17.5%, Australian 16.7%, Irish 9.1% and Greek 8.8%. 51.2% of people only spoke English at home. Other languages spoken at home included Mandarin 9.8%, Greek 6.0%, Indonesian 4.0%, Cantonese 3.7% and Spanish 2.1%. The most common responses for religion were No Religion, so described 34.6%, Catholic 22.0%, Eastern Orthodox 9.0% and Anglican 5.4%.

== Transport ==
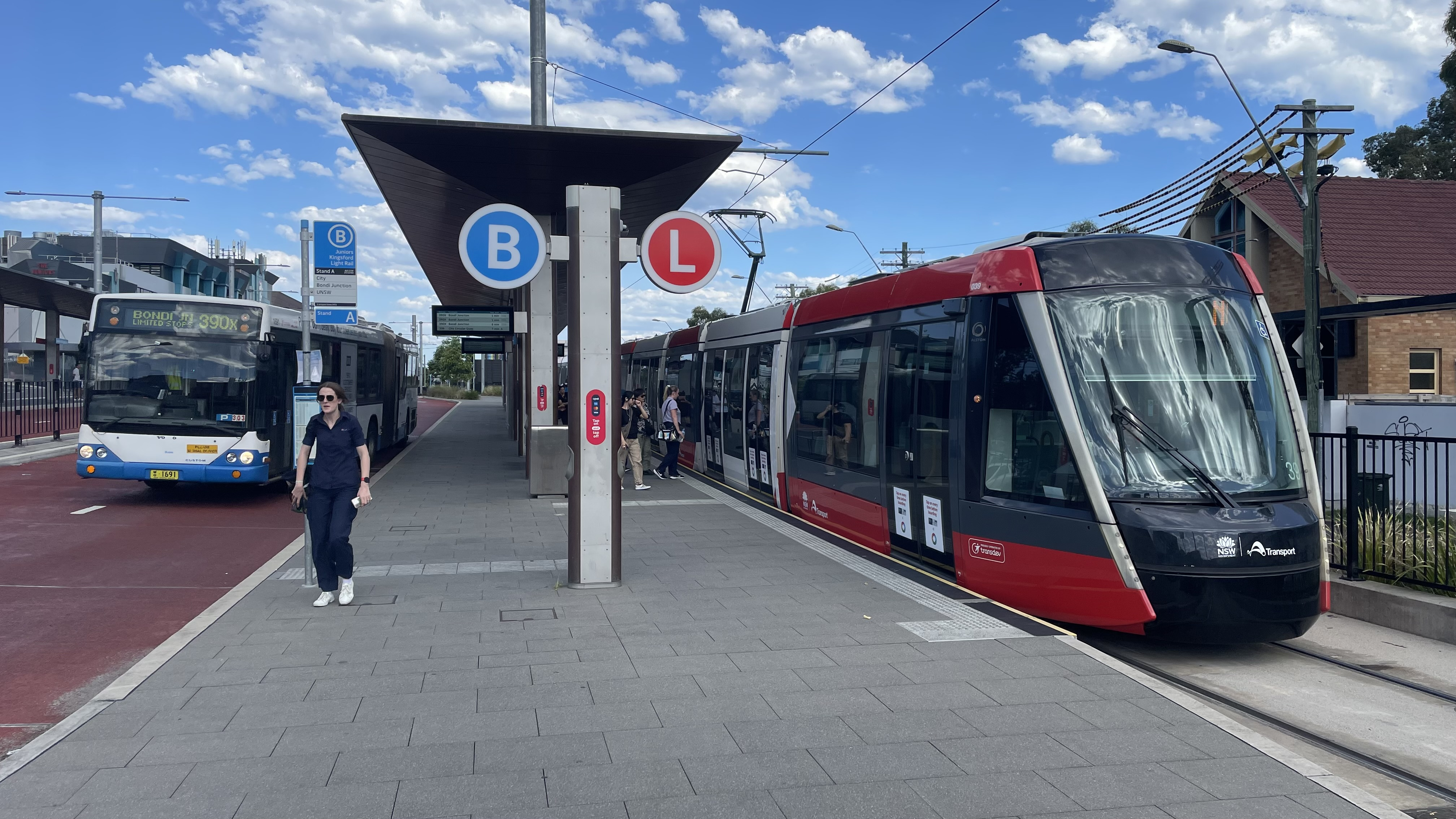
Juniors Kingsford, the terminus of the light rail line

Kingsford is the terminus of the light rail Kingsford Line which runs to Circular Quay.

Anzac Parade is the main road passing through the Kingsford and includes a shopping and restaurant strip.

== Politics ==
At the federal government level of politics, Kingsford is part of the Division of Kingsford Smith in the Australian House of Representatives. Kingsford Smith has always been a Labor (ALP) stronghold. Kingsford is located within the boundaries of the electoral districts of Maroubra, Coogee and Heffron. In terms of local government Kingsford is a part of Randwick City Council.

== Churches and schools ==
- St Spyridon Church is a Greek Orthodox church on Gardeners Road. St Spyridon College is an independent school, with one campus located adjacent to the church.
- The Indonesian Presbyterian Church and Kingsway Church are located at 94 Houston Road.
- Holy Trinity Anglican Church is located at the corner of Anzac Pde & Sturt Street, Kingsford.
- Gereja Focus Indonesia is an Indonesian students' church located on UNSW campus
- Kingsford Church of Christ is located on Anzac Parade

=== Gallery ===
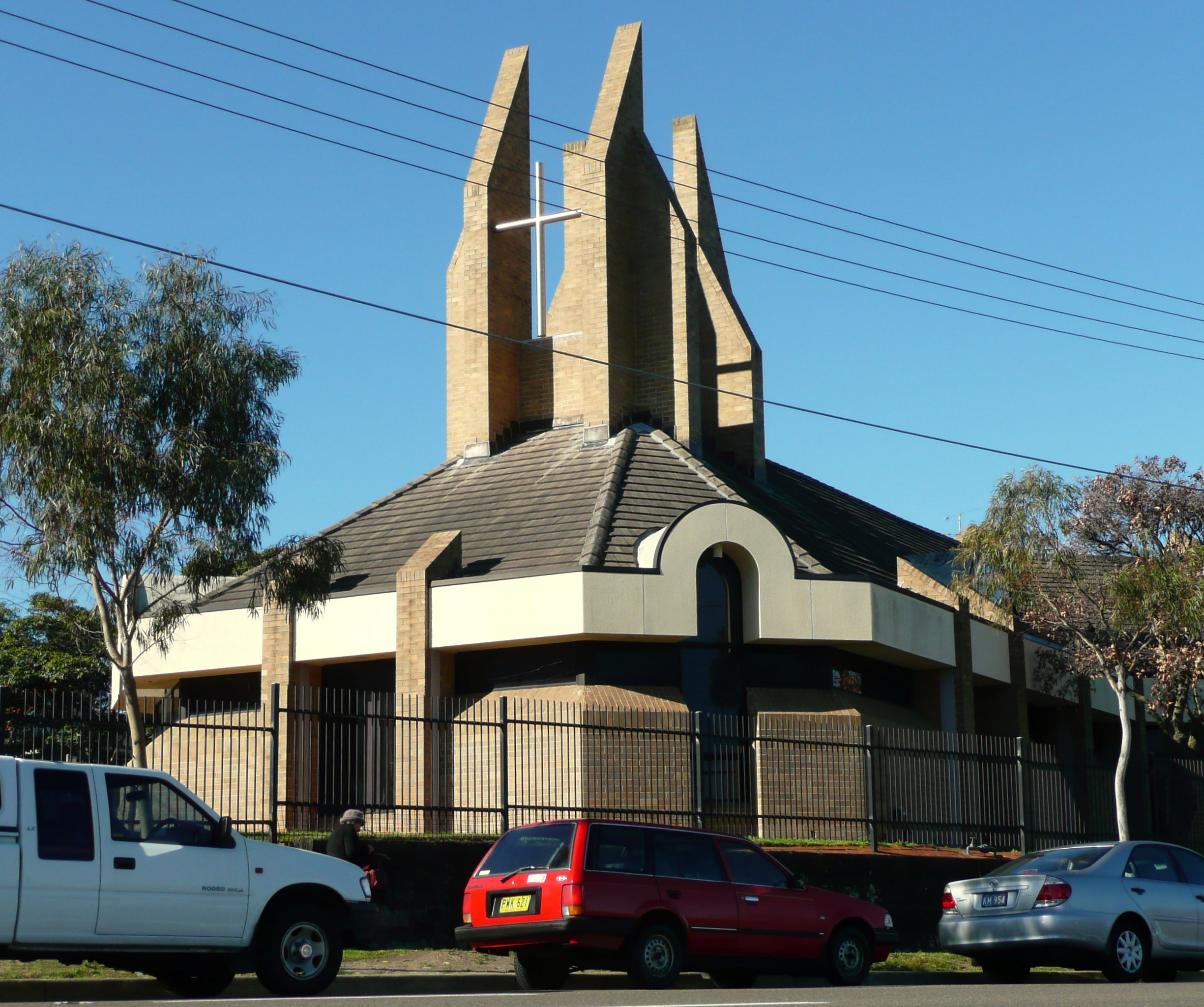
Holy Trinity Anglican Church, cnr Anzac Pde & Sturt Street

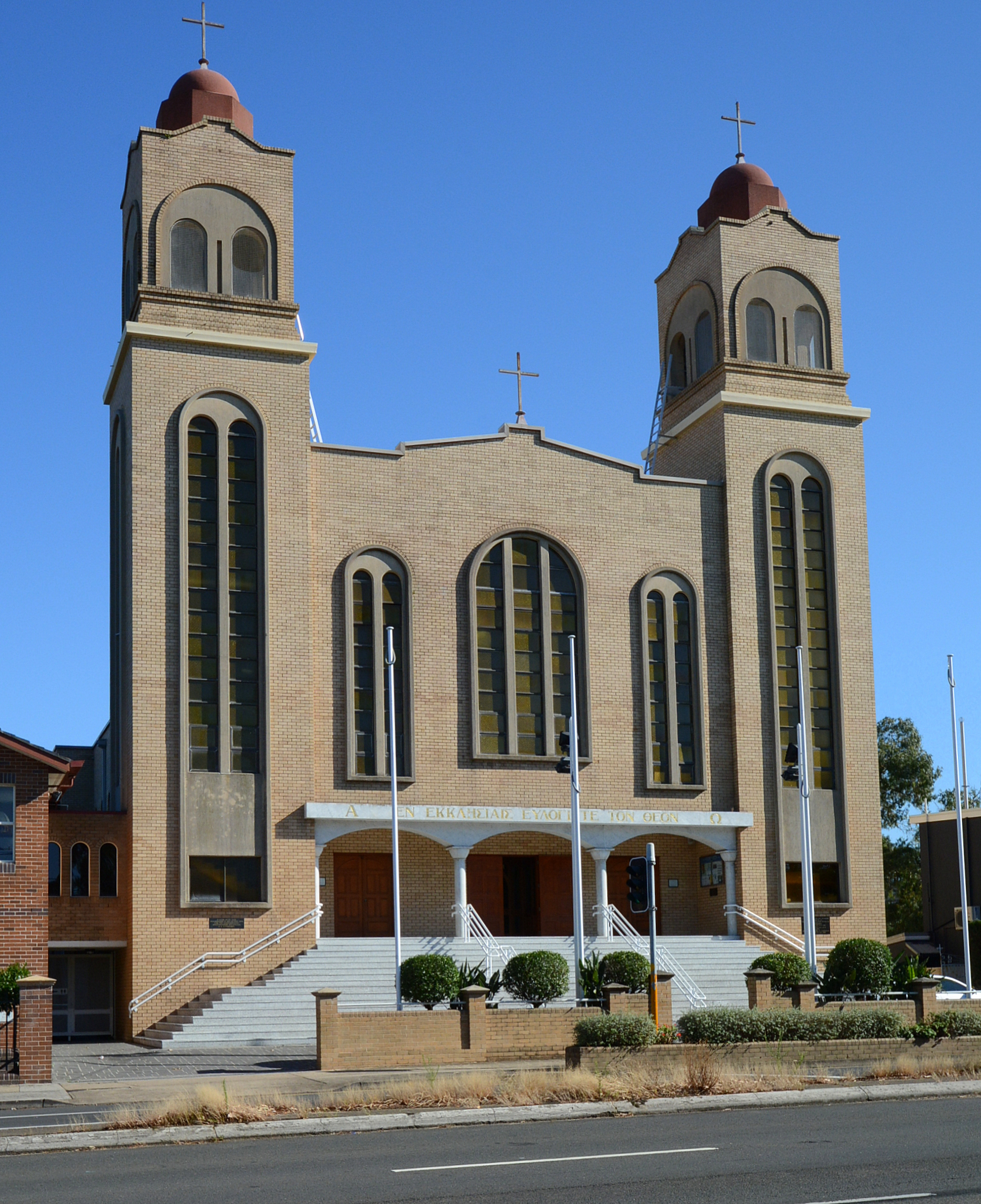
St Spyridon's Greek Orthodox Church, Gardeners Road

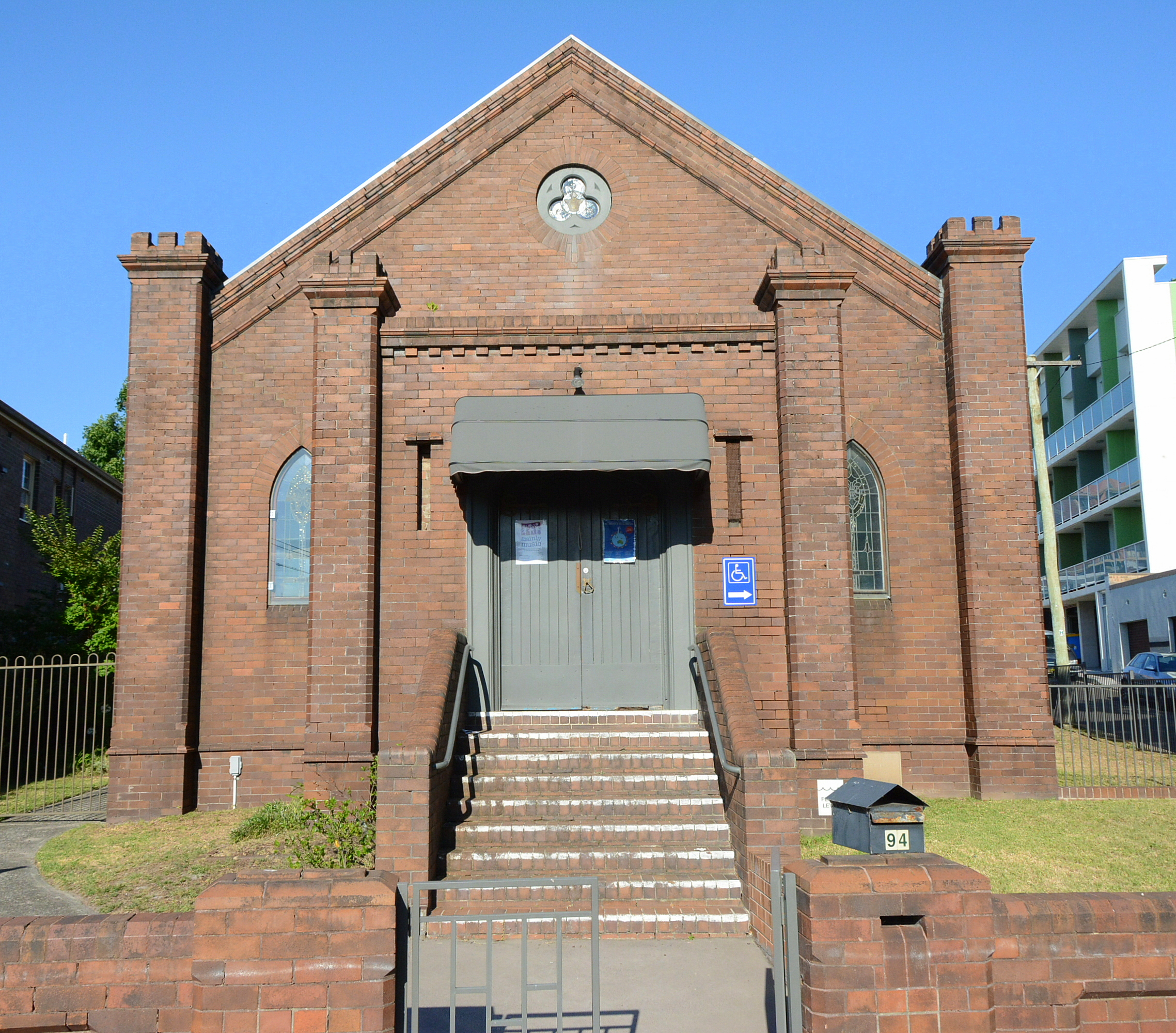
Indonesian Presbyterian Church, Houston Road

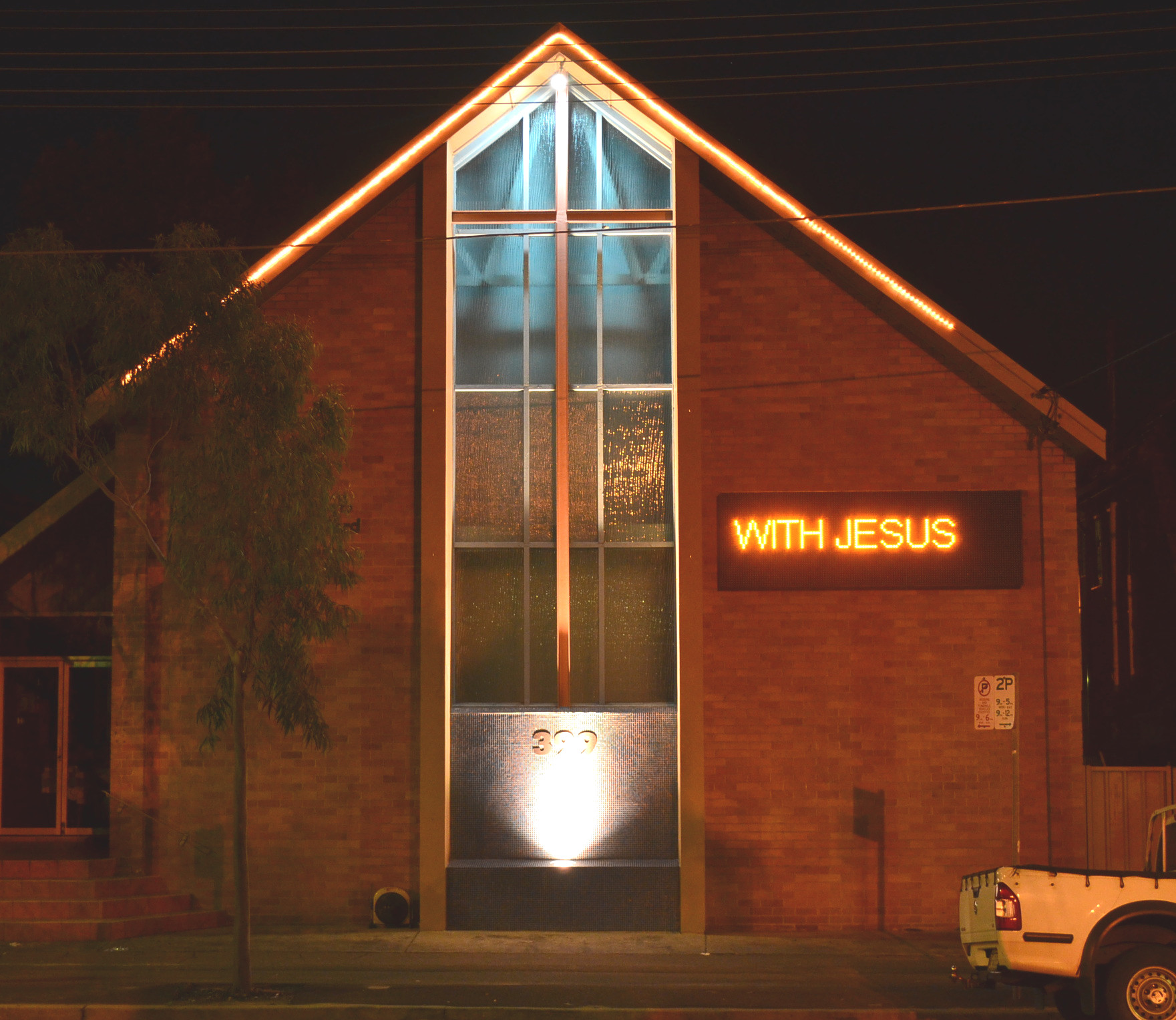
Church of Christ, Anzac Parade

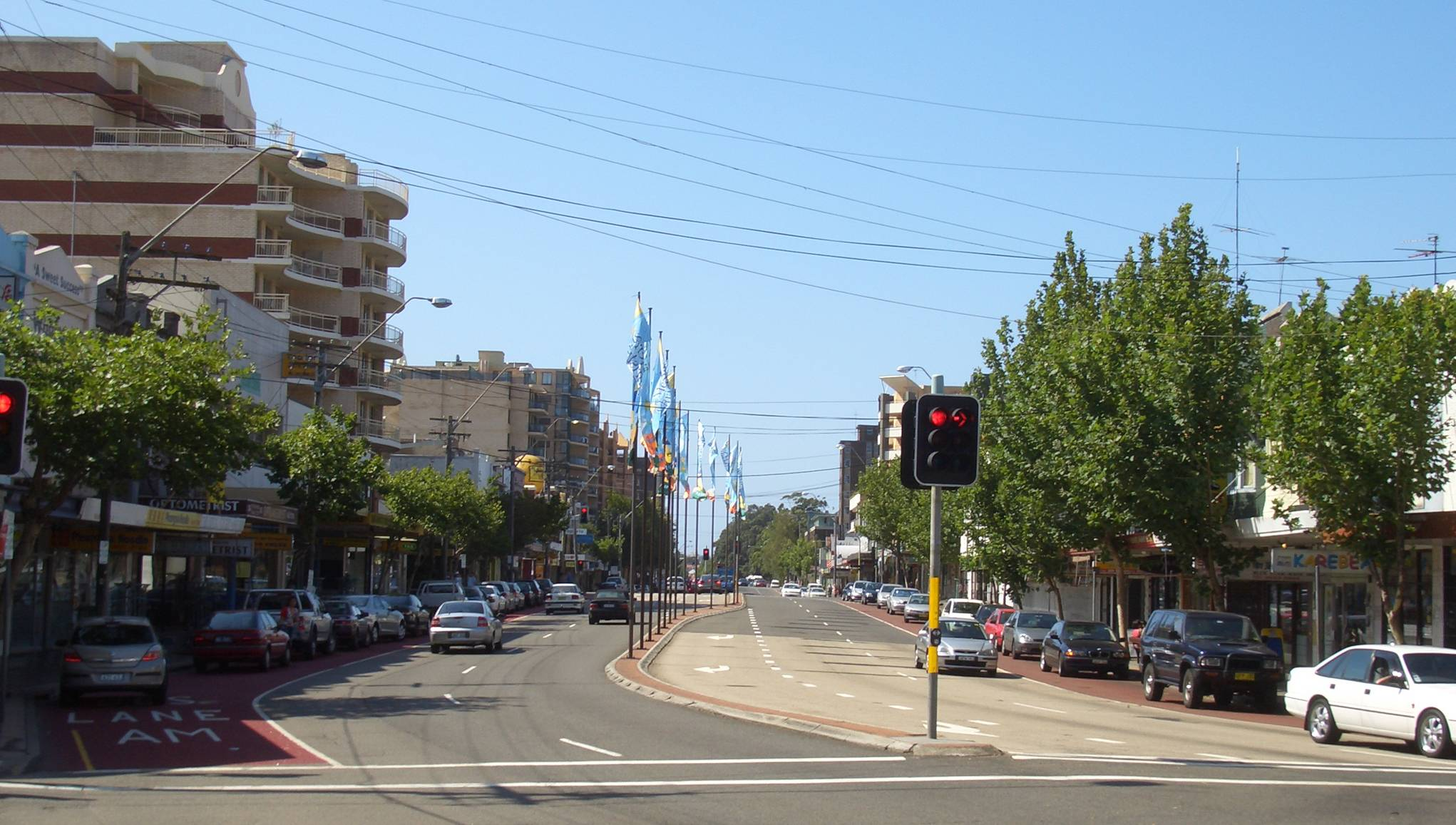
Anzac Parade, Sydney

== Notable people ==
- Charlie Bell, former CEO of McDonald's
- Ron Coote, rugby league player
- George Donikian, television and radio personality
- Keith Edwards, rugby league player
- Harold Larwood, cricketer
