= St. Spyridon Parish of South East Sydney =

St Spyridon Parish, Sydney
- St. Spyridon Greek Orthodox Parish, Sydney
- St Spyridon Greek Orthodox Church
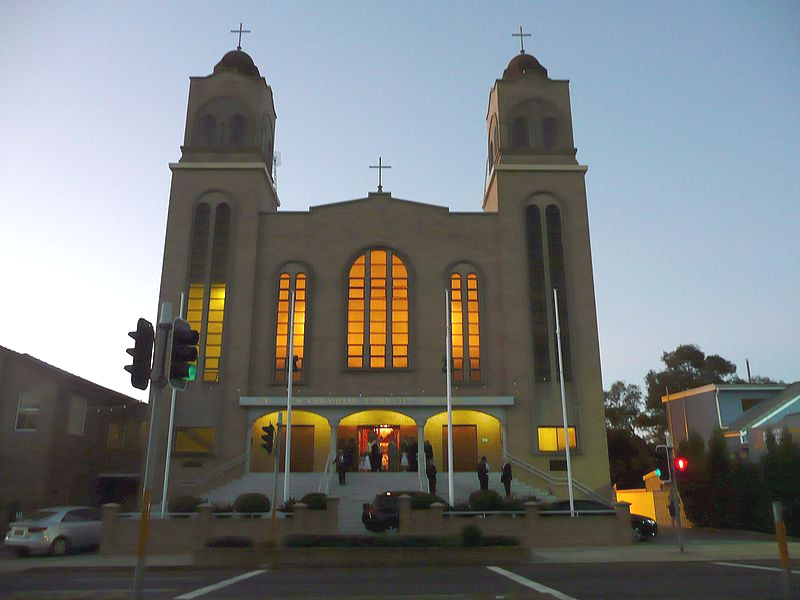
- St Spyridon's Church, pictured in c. 2010

- Location in greater metropolitan Sydney
- 33°55′31″S 151°13′29″E
- Location: 72-76 Gardeners Road, Kingsford, Sydney, New South Wales
- Country: Australia
- Denomination: Greek Orthodox
- Website: www.stspyridon.org.au

History
- Status: Church
- Founded: c. 1961
- Dedication: Saint Spyridon, Bishop of Trimythous the Wonder Worker
- Consecrated: 19 July 1975

Architecture
- Functional status: Active
- Architect: M Z Avramidis
- Architectural type: Church
- Style: [[Australian non-residential architectural styles#Modified Byzantine Basilica

Administration
- Archdiocese: Australia
- Parish: South East Sydney

Clergy
- Priest(s): Father Steven Scoutas, Presiding Priest, Protopresbyter of the Ecumenical Throne

The St. Spyridon Parish of South East Sydney is the Greek Orthodox presence in the south-east region of Sydney, New South Wales, Australia. The parish functions through the authority of the Greek Orthodox Archdiocese of Australia, under the jurisdiction of the Ecumenical Patriarchate of Constantinople.

== Overview ==
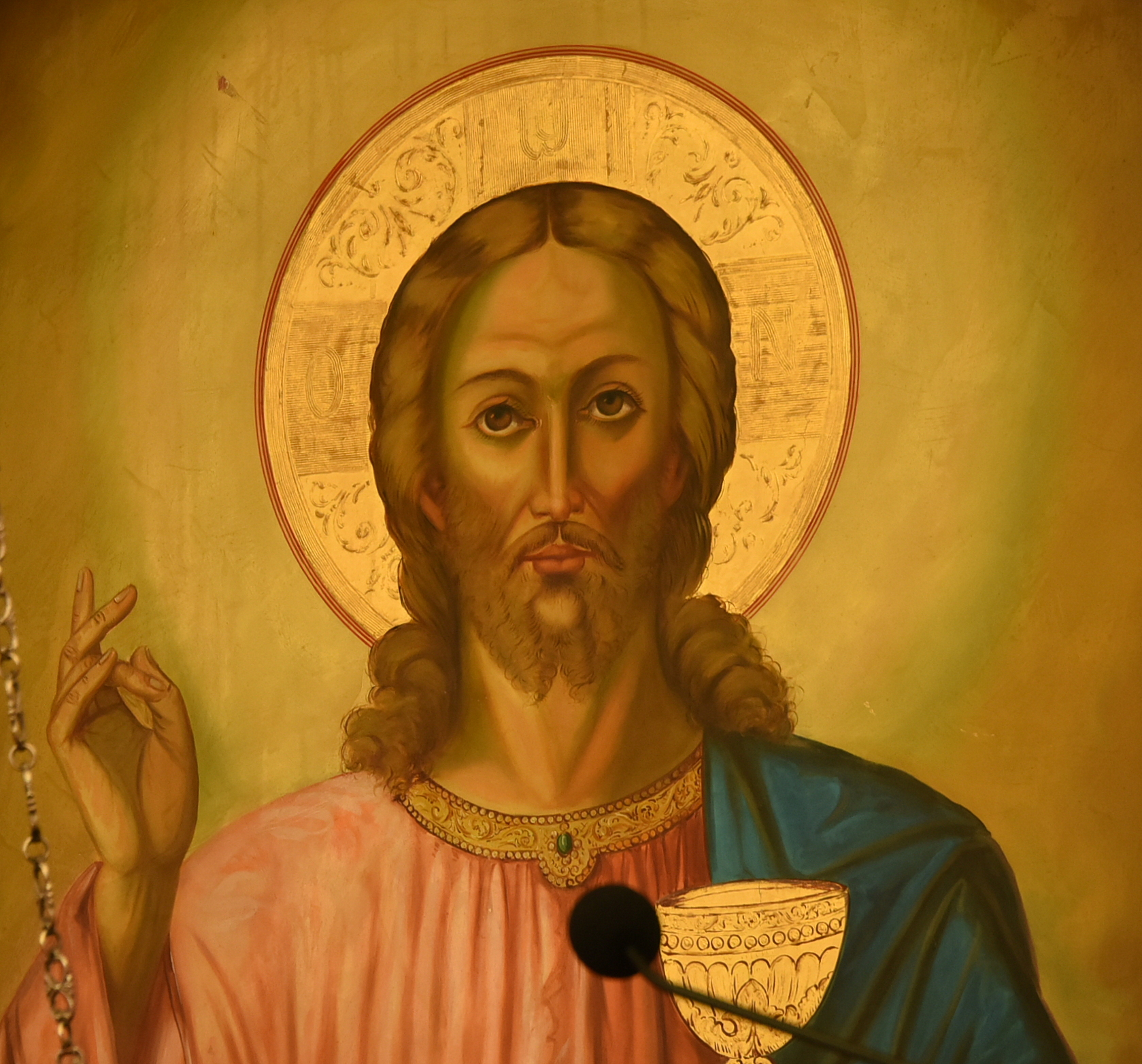
An image of Jesus Christ, displayed in the church, pictured in 2018

The church was built from 1961 in stages in the Byzantine Basilica style, flanked by twin towers, designed by M Z Avramidis, and completed in 1974. The colourful iconography within was painted by Greek Orthodox iconographer Evangelos Manolios. A plaque on the landing of the Church was unveiled by the Governor of New South Wales Sir Roden Cutler in July 1975 to commemorate Australian and Greek soldiers who made the supreme sacrifice in World War I and World War II.

The church is listed on the Randwick local government heritage register.

The parish has the vital responsibility for being the founder and having executive authority over St Spyridon College.

== Priests ==
=== Parish Priests ===
- Father Elias Economou (1961- October 1975)
- Father Steven Scoutas (October 1975-present)
- Father Damianos Karavanatzis (1976)

=== Assistant Priests ===
- Father Nicholas Bozikis (1988-1993)
- Father Anthony Vanikiotis (1993-1997)
- Father Chris Dimolianis (1997-1999)
- Father Agathangelo Masteas (2000-2004)
- Father Sotirios Papafilopoulos (2004-2007)
- Deacon (now Bishop) Evmenios Vasilopoulos (April 2007-December 2007)
- Father Andrew Joannou (2007-2010)
- Father Sotiris Drapaniotis (2010-March 2019)
- Father Amphilohios Papantoniou (March 2019-November 2021)
- Deacon Chris Baghos (December 2021-April 2022)
- Father Irenaeus Triantis (April 2022-February 2023)
- Father Stavros Ivanos (March 2023-present)

== See also ==
- Australian non-residential architectural styles
- Greek Australians
- Greek Orthodox Archdiocese of Australia and New Zealand
- Greek Orthodox churches in New South Wales
