= Saint Spyridon Church, Focșani =

Heritage site in Vrancea County, Romania

Coordinates: 45°41′43″N 27°10′15″E

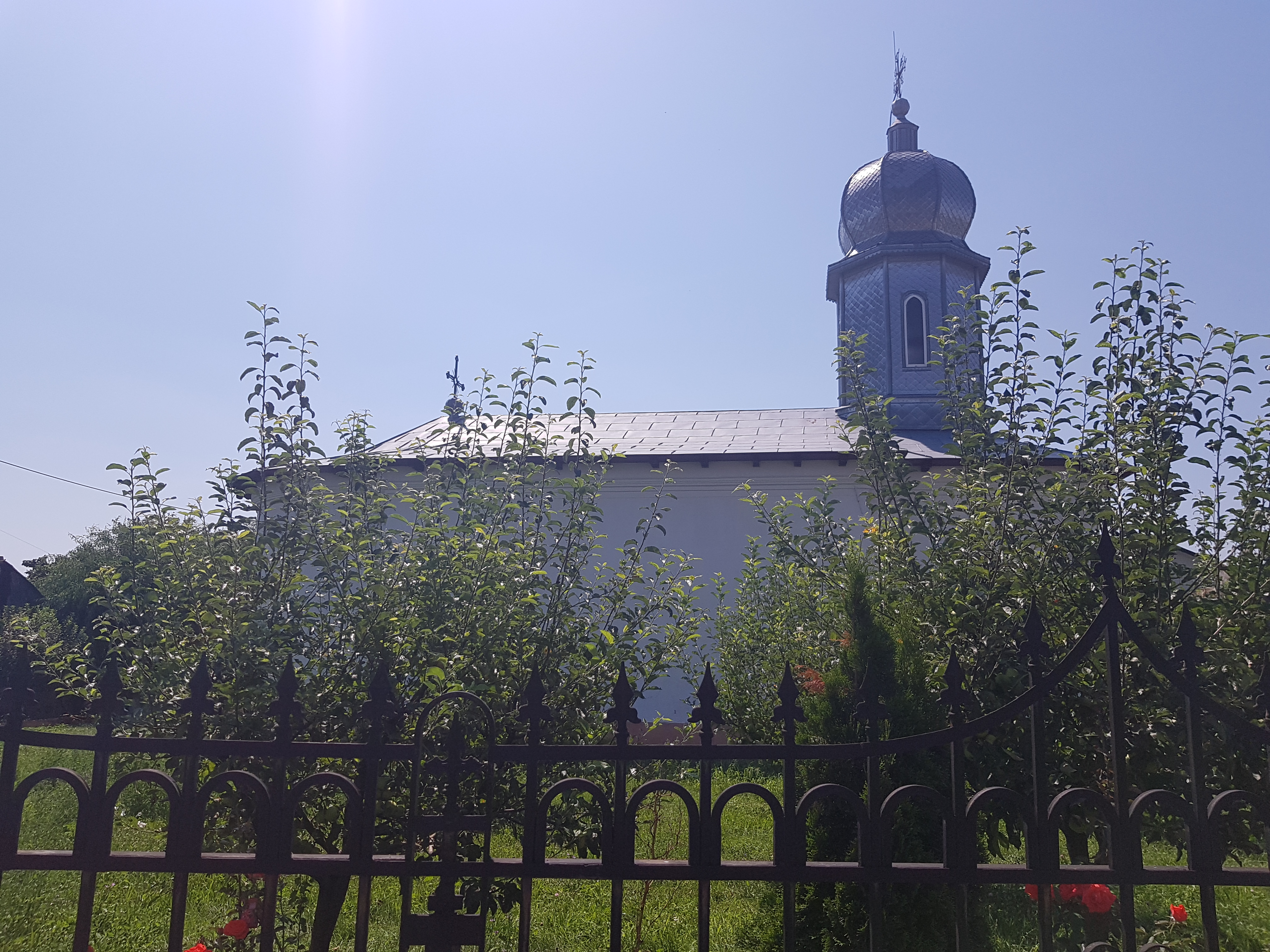
Saint Spyridon Church

Saint Spyridon Church (Romanian: Biserica Sfântul Spiridon) is a Romanian Orthodox church located at 41 Tăbăcari Street in Focșani, Romania. It is dedicated to Saint Spyridon.

The church was built in 1820–1826. It is listed as a historic monument by Romania's Ministry of Culture and Religious Affairs.
