= St Spyridon College =

Location
- Eastern Suburbs, Sydney, New South Wales; Australia; 33°57′17″S 151°14′38″E

Information
- Type: Independent primary and secondary school
- Motto: Greek: ΑΙΕΝ ΑΡΙΣΤΕΥΕΙΝ (forever excelling)
- Religious affiliations: Greek Orthodox Archdiocese of Australia; St Spyridon Parish and Community of South East Sydney
- Denomination: Greek Orthodoxy
- Established: 1983; 43 years ago
- Educational authority: New South Wales Department of Education
- Staff: 72.3 FTE (2019)
- Years: Preschool (k-1) –12
- Enrolment: 777 (2019)
- Campus: Senior School: Maroubra; Junior School: Kingsford
- Campus type: Suburban
- Colours: Navy blue and white
- Slogan: Developing the whole person, mind, body and soul
- Affiliations: Independent Schools Council of Australia; Independent Schools Association
- Website: stspyridon.nsw.edu.au

St Spyridon College is a dual-campus independent Greek Orthodox primary and secondary school, in the eastern suburbs of Sydney, New South Wales, Australia. The College's primary school campus is located in Kingsford and the secondary school campus is located in Maroubra.

Established in 1983, the College enrolled approximately 750 students in 2019, from Kindergarten -1 to Year 12, of whom no students identified as Indigenous Australians and 83 percent were from a language background other than English. Administrative oversight of the school is managed by the St Spyridon Parish and Community of South East Sydney in accordance with a curriculum developed by the New South Wales Education Standards Authority.

The principal of the high school campus is Amelia Katsogiannis. The principal of the primary school campus in Alan Dookie. The majority of staff are not members of the NSW's teachers' union. Approximately 50% of staff were not born in Australia, with many on work visas. Greece, Ireland, the United Kingdom, South Africa and Cyprus have produced the most expatriate teachers at the school.

== Academic Prowess ==
The school was ranked 81st in NSW based on 2025 HSC with a median ATAR of 76.4. Over 90% of students received a band 5 or 6 ATAR in 2025. According to NESA, it ranked above average for NAPLAN results every year since 2023.

The school has been praised for its outstanding Legal Studies department, with all graduates in 2024 receiving band 6s.

== Transport links ==
Both campuses are served by buses. The secondary campus is served directly by routes 399, 390X, 394X, 658, 686, 735, 736, 745 on Anzac Pde and 747 and indirectly by route 375 on Beauchamp Rd and by 397 and 397X on Chicago Ave. The primary campus is served by routes 343, 358, 632, 661, 692, 715 and 743 and indirectly by 392,392X,392N on Bunnerong Rd and 390X,394X,396X,397X,399,396 at Juniors Kingsford Light Rail (indirect school bus services are not shown). Both campuses are served by private buses to Potts Point, Earlwood and Sans Souci.

The primary campus is also in proximity to the L3 Light Rail line from Juniors Kingsford station. The possibility for a light rail station outside the secondary campus has been raised by ALTRAC, the contractors of Sydney's Light Rail system. Many students commute to the inner west and north shore via Sydney's public transportation network, often interchanging at Central. No students are currently known to make use of NSW Trainlink services.

The primary campus is located on Gardener's Road which provides links to Mascot, Kingsford and St Peters Interchange. The senior campus is located on ANZAC Parade, which travels through most of Eastern Sydney.

== Traditions ==
The school actively participates in annual celebrations of Greek Independence Day in the Sydney CBD, notably a march from Martin Place to the Sydney Opera House.

Year 11 male students typically carry the Epitaph (Greek: Ἐπιτάφιος, epitáphios) on the night of Holy Friday to commemorate Orthodox Easter.

Students and teachers partake in the annual Step Out, Speak Out rally against domestic violence in Randwick and Coogee.

Year 12 and 6 students traditional engage in the assistance of the soup kitchen at St Constanine and Helen's Church in Newtown.

The school is a close partner of the Windgap foundation, which supports disabled young adults and teenagers.

== Religion ==
The majority of students are baptised Greek Orthodox Christians, however many are not active in their faith. The school is not known to discriminate enrolments based on religion. However, as of 2025, only Christian, Jewish or irreligious individuals are known to attend.

The school was built in the name of St. Spyridon, Bishop of Trimythous. His prayer is often chanted.

As of 2026, students are required to attend two Church services per term at the school's associated Church, during School hours. However, students are not required to partake in the sacraments.

Study of Orthodox Christianity is compulsory for years K-10. Years K-6 are also required to undergo Byzantine chanting lessons weekly. Students are accessed on the capability in the understanding of the former.

The school canteens comply with fasting regulations.

== Language and identity ==
The majority of school activity is conducted in English, although both Greek and Serbian are taught and spoken to a lesser extent. Most students identify first as Australian and almost all were born in the nation.

Both the Australian and Greek national anthems are sung weekly at the primary campus.

== Controversy and Concern ==
Controversy arose in the early 2020s regarding plans to construct apartments on the site of the Junior Campus. Such plans never went ahead.

Concerns of the school been victim to anti-immigrant and anti-Greek harassment were raised in the 1980s and 1990s following a series of minor non-violent incidents.

Criticism of the construction of a private school in proximity to Maroubra and Kingsford's housing commissions have been raised.

Since the election of Archbishop Makarios Griniezakis in 2019, concerns have been raised in regard to the use of school fees by the archdiocese to fund other endeavours instead of reinvesting the profit into the school.

In 2021, the school's Wikipedia page was edited to falsely accuse executive staff of cannibalism and paedophilia.

In 2024, students received emails from accounts posing as executive staff announcing school cancelations and other obscenities.

The 2026 Sydney Greek Independence Day celebrations were forced to be relocated from Martin Place to Hyde Park for a significantly shorter march due to concerns regarding a potential terror attack, following the 2025 Bondi Beach Shooting. Additional police forces were also present due to the presence of Prime Minister Anthony Albanese. Greek Prime Minister Kyriakos Mitsotakis also cancelled his visit to Australia, the celebrations, and the school due to the war in the middle east.

== Construction Effort ==
The senior campus was built on a former garbage dump provided to the Greek Orthodox Archdiocese of Australia by the Greiner government in the early 1990s.

The senior campus would go on to construct two additional buildings: the T-Wing, completed in the early 2000s and SPACE, completed in the early-2010s

The primary campus received a renovated K-3 wing in 2020, despite the Covid-19 pandemic and the aforementioned apartment scandal.

In 2025, the school received a grant of $500000 from the Australian Government at the request of Kingsford-Smith MP Matt Thistlethwaite for the upgrade and reconstruction of facilities. Such initiatives are yet to begin construction.

The school is often regarded as too small to fit required demand, particularly for the secondary campus.

== Notable alumni ==
- Panos Armenakas – professional soccer player
- Daniel Arzani – professional soccer player
- Niko Fotopoulos – Love Island 2024 finalist

== See also ==
- List of non-government schools in New South Wales
- Greek Orthodox Archdiocese of Australia
