= Greek Orthodox Diocese of Adelaide =

Diocese of Adelaide

Location
- Country: Australia
- Territory: South Australia, Northern Territory

Statistics
- Churches: 24
- Schools: 2

Information
- Denomination: Greek Orthodox
- Cathedral: Saint Sophia
- Secular priests: ≈20
- Language: Greek, English

Current leadership
- Patriarch: Ecumenical Patriarch of Constantinople
- Major Archbishop: Archbishop Makarios of Australia
- Bishop: Bishop Silouan of Adelaide

The Greek Orthodox Diocese of Adelaide is one of six dioceses within the Greek Orthodox Archdiocese of Australia. The current Bishop of Adelaide is Bishop Silouan (Fotineas) who is under the jurisdiction of Archbishop Makarios of Australia.

== Overview ==
The Greek Orthodox Diocese of Adelaide was formed in 2024 following the amendment of the constitution of the Greek Orthodox Archdiocese of Australia which saw the creation of six dioceses, the others being based in Perth, Melbourne, Chora (Victoria), Brisbane and Canberra. Each diocese has a Regional Bishop (Chorepiskopos) with Bishop Silouan the current Bishop of Adelaide. Formerly, the Archdiocese was structured with 3 to 5 "Archdiocesan Districts", with an auxiliary Bishop appointed to each one. Adelaide has had a resident Bishop since 1975, with this diocese serving the whole of South Australia and the Northern Territory. At various times, most recently between 2002 and 2019, Western Australia had also been under the Adelaide district of the Archdiocese. The central offices of the District are based at the Archdiocesan Cathedral in Bowden, having been formerly based at the Parish of St. Panteleimon in Glenelg North.

== Regional Bishops of Adelaide ==
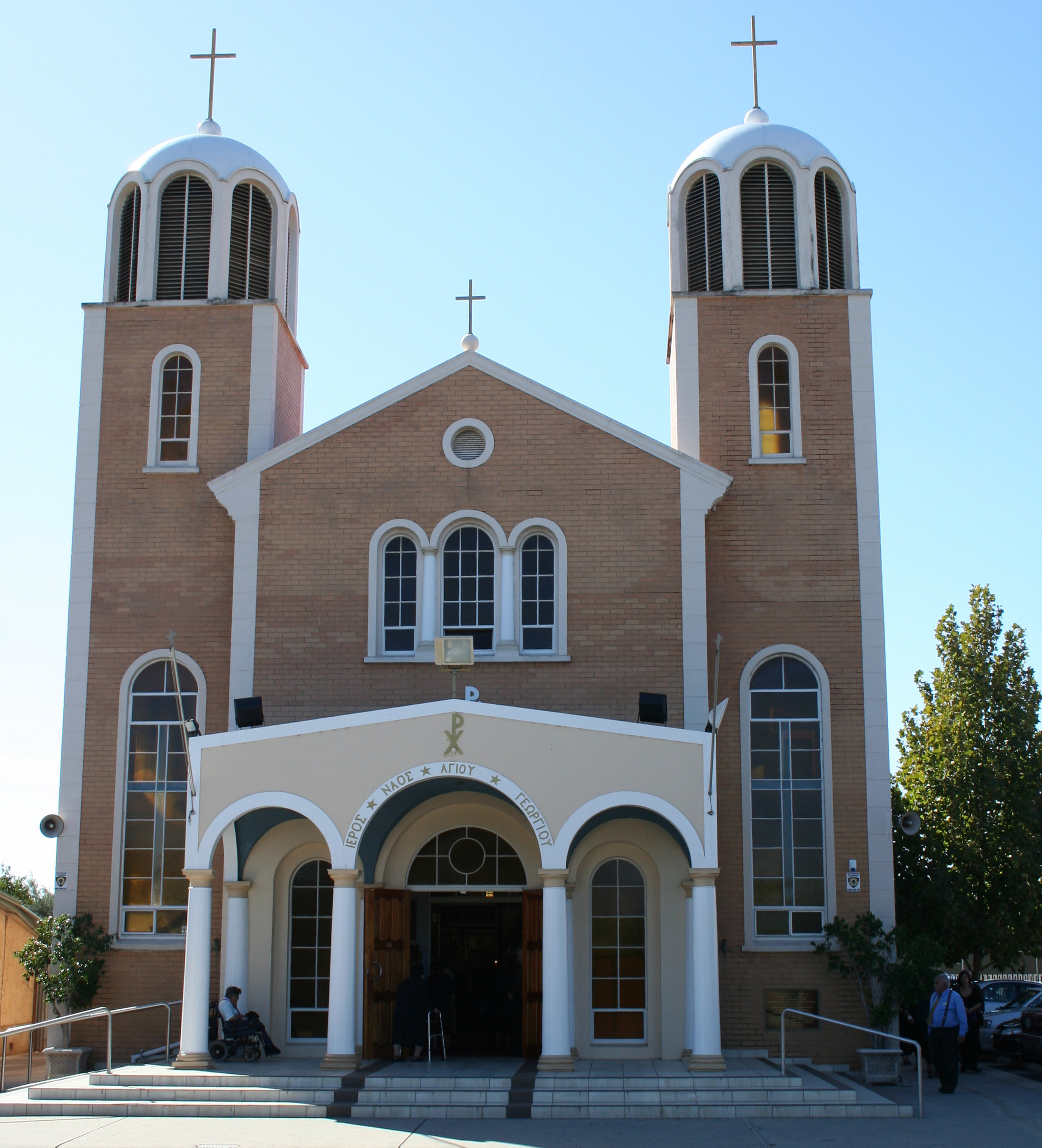
St. George Greek Orthodox Parish in Thebarton

=== Bishop Silouan (Fotineas) ===
Since the establishment of the diocese in 2024, Bishop Silouan has been the Regional Bishop of Adelaide. Previously, Bishop Silouan (titled Bishop of Sinope) was the auxiliary Bishop responsible for the District of Adelaide, having been appointed Archdiocesan Vicar in October 2019, elected as a bishop by the Synod of the Ecumenical Patriarchate in November 2019 and consecrated as Bishop of Sinope by Archbishop Makarios on January 19, 2020, at the Cathedral of the Annunciation of Our Lady in Sydney. Prior to this appointment, Bishop Silouan served as Parish Priest of Holy Monastery of St. Nektarios in Croydon Park (Adelaide) and the Parish of the Dormition of Our Lady in Mount Gravatt, Queensland. Bishop Silouan was born in Queensland and is the third Australian born Greek Orthodox Bishop.

== Former Assistant Bishops in Adelaide ==
Prior to the establishment of designated dioceses within Australia, each city was under an Archdiocesan District, each with an assistant Bishop appointed by the Archbishop.

=== Bishop Panteleimon of Theoupoleos (1975 – 1979) ===
Bishop Panteleimon (Sklavos) was the first resident Bishop appointed to Adelaide. He arrived in Australia, from Greece, in 1964 and served the large parish of St George in Thebarton until his elevation to the episcopate on the feast of St Basil The Great in 1971. He initially served as a Bishop in Sydney and Melbourne before serving in Adelaide from 1975 until 1979. He would then serve in Melbourne until his retirement to Thessaloniki 1984. In 2018, the Ecumenical Patriarchate elevated Bishop Panteleimon to Metropolitan of Vryoula.

=== Bishop Ezekiel of Dervis (1979 – 1984) ===
Bishop Ezekiel (Kefalas) was born in Akritas, Kilkis on 25 December 1938 and moved to Australia in 1962 serving at various parishes within Sydney. On 1 March 1977 Ezekiel was elected as Bishop of Dervis and assistant to Archbishop Stylianos. Initially serving in Perth, Ezekiel was transferred to Adelaide in 1979 serving this district until 1984. He was then appointed to Archdiocesan vicar of Melbourne where he would serve for 37 years until his retirement in 2021. At the time of his retirement, Ezekiel was elevated to the honour of Metropolitan Bishop, retaining the honorary see of Dervis.

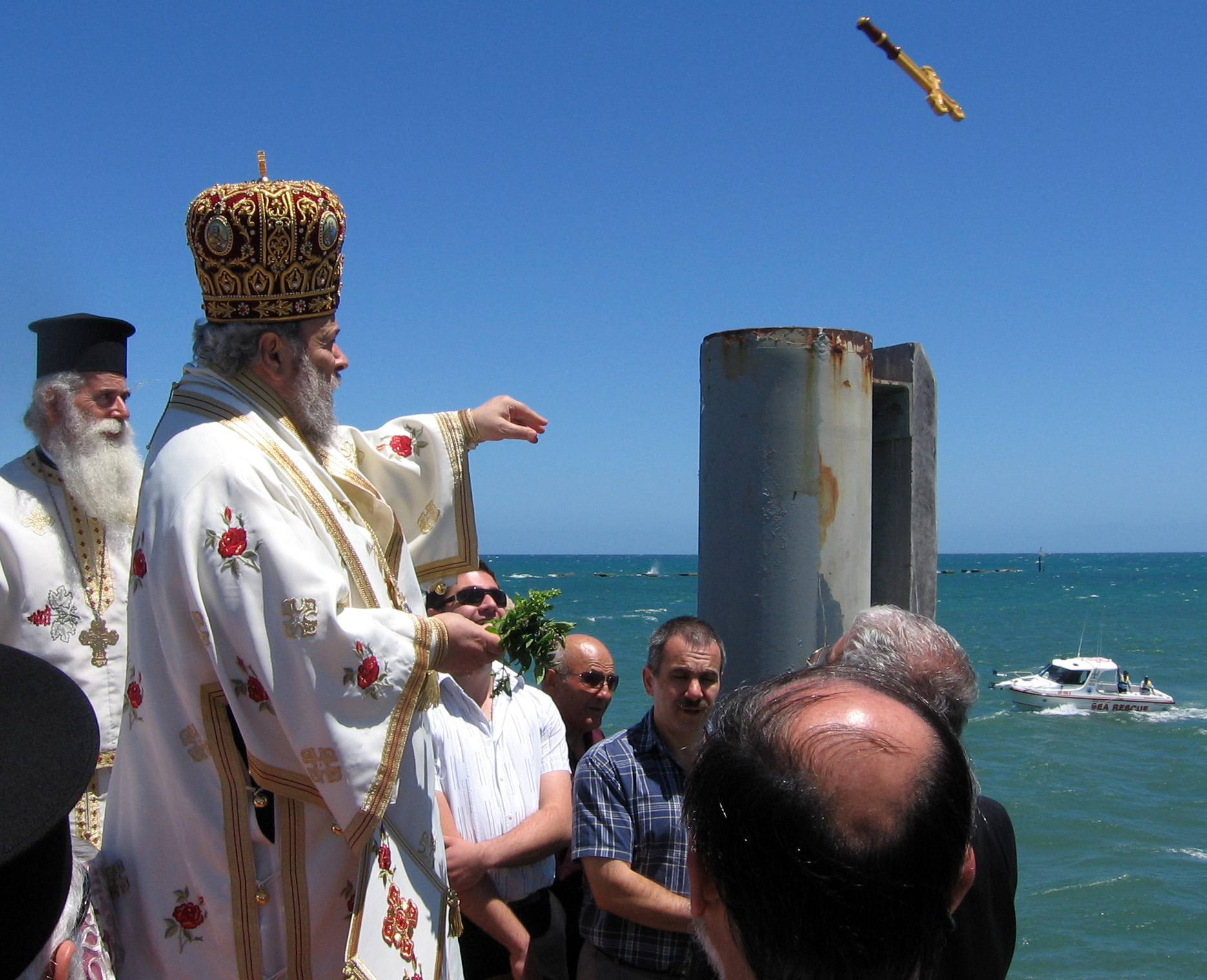
Bishop Nikandros of Dorylaion is currently the longest serving Bishop in Adelaide serving from 2002 – 2019 as an assistant to Archbishop Stylianos.

=== Bishop Paul of Christianoupolis (1984 – 1989) ===
Bishop Paul, (Apostolos Laios) was born in 1938 in Arta and graduated from the Theological School of Halki in 1962. Pavlos would serve the church in Greece before moving to Australia in 1970 where he served in Melbourne and Sydney. In 1984, Pavlos was elevated to the episcopate and appointed to the district of Adelaide where he would serve until his retirement in 1989. He died on September 17, 2024 and is buried at Centennial Park Cemetery in Pasadena, Adelaide.

=== Bishop Joseph of Arianzos (1990 – 2000) ===
Served Adelaide 1990 to 2000.

=== Bishop Seraphim of Christianoupolis (2001 – 2002) ===
Served Adelaide 2001 and 2002.

=== Bishop Nikandros of Dorylaion (2002 – 2019) ===
Served Adelaide 2002 to 2019.

== Parishes and Monasteries in South Australia and the Northern Territory ==
=== Archdiocesan Parishes located in Metropolitan Adelaide ===
Name	Year founded	Suburb	Street Address	Comment	Source
Parish of Sts Raphael, Nicholaos & Irene	1995	Athelstone	232 Gorge Road	New Church building was opened in 2019	
Cathedral of St. Sophia	2022	Bowden	100 Drayton Street	Officially opened as Archdiocesan Cathedral by Archbishop Makarios on 27, November 2022	
Parish of St. Andrew	1986	Christie Downs	Cnr Beach & Morton Roads		
Holy Monastery of St. Nektarios	1973	Croydon Park	81-93 Regency Road		
Parish of St. Panteleimon	1981	Glenelg North	533 Anzac Hwy	Originally built as a private Chapel for the local Bishop but later opened for public services. In 2023, the parish was relocated to Fulton Street due to its growing population with St. Panteleimon converted into an English speaking parish.	
Parish of Holy Cross	2023	Glenelg North	18 Fulton Street	Opened 19 November 2023 to cater for the growth of St. Panteleimon parish.	
Parish of St. Sophrony	2023	Hectorville	14 North Street	Opened 15, January 2023 as a fully English speaking Parish	
Parish of Prophet Elias	1959	Norwood	87 Beulah Road		
Parish of the Nativity of Christ	1960	Port Adelaide	5-7 Church Street		
Parish of St. Anthony	1967	Prospect	65-67 Milner Street		
Parish of St. Demetrios	1981	Salisbury Plain	27 Saints Road		
Parish of St. George	1959	Thebarton	60 Rose Street		
Parish of St. Spyridon	1959	Unley	50 Oxford Terrace		

=== Archdiocesan Parishes located in Regional South Australia ===
Name	Year founded	Suburb	Street Address	Comment	Source
Parish of The Dormition of our Lady		Berri	1324, B201	One service a fortnight at either Berri or Berri North. Major Feast Days rotate between these two Parishes and at Renmark	
Parish of St. Demetrios	1967	Berri North	35 Zante Road	One service a fortnight at either Berri or Berri North. Major Feast Days rotate between these two Parishes and at Renmark	
Parish of St. Nicholas		Coober Pedy	St. Nicholas Street		
Parish of St. John	1980s	Port Augusta	44 Trent Road		
Parish of St. George	1924	Port Pirie	41 Florence Street	First Greek Orthodox Parish in South Australia. The current building was opened in 1960. Services are now held monthly as well as on major Feast Days.	
Parish of Sts. Constantine and Helen	1969	Renmark	21 Renmark Avenue	Services held fortnightly. Major Feast Days rotate between Renmark, Berri and Berri North.	
Parish of St. Nicholas		Thevenard	3 Kent Street		
Parish of St. Nicholas	2013	Wallaroo	7 Elizabeth Street	Services held monthly on Saturdays.	
Parish of Sts. Constantine and Helen	<1976	Whyalla Playford	45 Gowrie Avenue		

=== Archdiocesan Parishes located in the Northern Territory ===
Name	Year founded	Suburb	Street Address	Notes	Source
Parish of St. Nicholas	1953	Darwin	92 Cavenagh Street		
Parish of St Savvas of Kalymnos	2023	Palmerston	2 Palmerston Circuit	Temporary location until a permanent Church is built	

== Schools ==
There are two Archdiocesan schools within the diocese of Adelaide.

- St George College, established in 1983.
- St Spyridon College, established in 2004.

== See also ==
- Archbishop Makarios of Australia
- Autocephalous Greek Orthodox Church of America and Australia
- Ecumenical Patriarchate of Constantinople
- Greek Australians
- Greek Orthodox Archdiocese of Australia
- Greek Orthodox Churches in NSW
- South Australia
- Northern Territory
