= Saints Theodores Greek Orthodox Church =

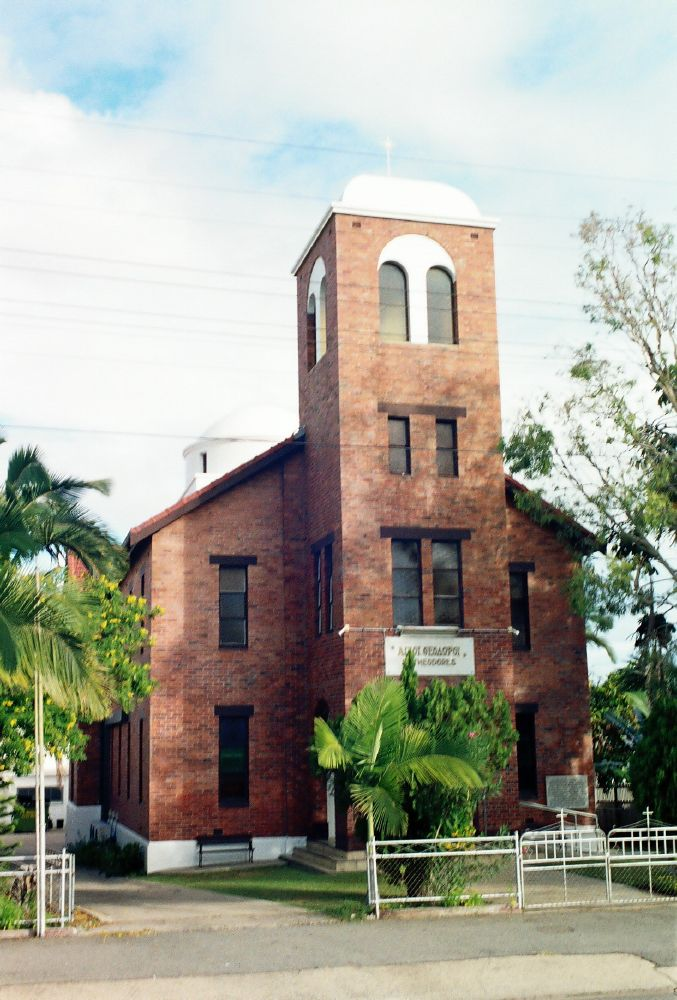
- Saints Theodores Greek Orthodox Church

- Location within Queensland Location within Australia
- 19.2676°S 146.8073°E
- Location: 799 Flinders Street, Townsville CBD, City of Townsville, Queensland, Australia

History
- Design period: 1940s–1960s (post-World War II)
- Built: 1947–1950

Site notes
- Architect(s): M. Vogiatzoglou, Joseph Gabriel Rooney
- Architectural style: Romanesque

Queensland Heritage Register
- Official name: Saints Theodores Greek Orthodox Church
- Type: state heritage (built)
- Designated: 25 August 2000
- Reference no.: 601635
- Significant period: 1940s (historical); 1940s–ongoing (social)
- Significant components: dome, church, mural / fresco, views to, tower, furniture/fittings
- Builders: Vause and Hayne

Saints Theodores Greek Orthodox Church is a heritage-listed church at 799 Flinders Street, Townsville CBD, City of Townsville, Queensland, Australia. It was designed by M. Vogiatzoglou and Joseph Gabriel Rooney, and built from 1947 to 1950 by Vause and Hayne. It was added to the Queensland Heritage Register on 25 August 2000.

== History ==
A few Greeks migrated to Australia since 1850, but many more came in the 20th century, due in part to turbulence and wars in Greece in the early years. Greeks began to arrive and settle in Townsville in approximately 1916, but did not establish a formal Greek Community until the 1940s. To meet the interim religious needs of this developing Townsville Greek community, a visiting priest from Innisfail conducted services in St James' Cathedral, as did Metropolitan of Australia Timotheos Evangelinidis when visiting this community. Metropolitan Timotheos was also instrumental in establishing the Greek Community in Townsville.

During one of the visits of Archbishop Timothios to Townsville in April 1944, Greek resident Theodoros Calagatis offered the archbishop £1,000 for the purpose of building a Greek Church in Townsville. Archbishop Timothios called a general meeting of all Townsville Greeks on Sunday 4 May 1944. Approximately 65 people attended this meeting in which Archbishop Timothios was president, the chairman was Mr S. Nennas, and Mr George Keyatta, M.L.A., also presided:

The meeting ended at 1.30 a.m. and nearly £3,000 was collected. The object of the collection was to establish and maintain faithfully and irrevocably the Dogma, the Holy Canons and conform to the immemorial usage of the Greek Orthodox church; to build and maintain a sacred church for public worship in the name of the Saints Theodores; to establish a Greek school for the teaching of the Greek language and promote religious and moral education; to promote good-will and co-operation between members of the community and to ensure loyalty to the laws of this country and to promote good fellowship between our Australian citizens. The trustees of this fund being His Grace Archbishop Timothios of Australia and New Zealand, The Consul General for Greece, Mr. Freeleagus, and George Keyatta, M.L.A. The money collected was deposited in the Bank of Australasia on account of the Greek Orthodox Church and School Building Fund.

In approximately March 1945, a committee was elected at a general meeting with the power to acquire property and maintain the objects of the Greek Community of Townsville. This also included the commitment to build a church, priest's residence, and a community hall.

The foundation Committee members responsible for the commencement of this church and the laying of the foundation stone were:

"Mr Theodoros Kalafatis, Great Benefactor and Honorary Chairman; Mr Michael Leondarakis, President; Mr Emmanuel Atherinos, Vice President; Mr John Manikaros, Secretary; Mr Spyridon Theo Nennas, Treasurer; Mr Charlie Marendy; Mr George Kyriakakis; Mr Emmanuel Barboutis; Mr Michael N. Bogiatzis, Members."

Townsville's Saints Theodores Church, the third Greek Orthodox Church built in Queensland, was designed by M. Vogiatzoglou. The architect for the project was J.G. Rooney, and the builders were Vause and Hayne. The local Townsville firm of Gelling & Haig, a business which operated in Flinders Street (1931–1974), made the steelwork used in the construction of the church.

The granite foundation stone of Townsville's Saints Theodores Greek Orthodox Church was laid in a ceremony performed by Archbishop Timothios, and attended by the Honorary Greek Consul Mr C. Freeleagus, on 16 March 1947. A Stratigos was present at the ceremony, a special envoy from Greece and Vice-President for the Greek-Australian Soldiers' League. who six months earlier had brought to Australia an urn containing earth from Australian soldiers' graves in Greece, breaking a 2,600-year tradition forbidding Greek soil to be sent to another country. The tradition was broken as a mark of the admiration and esteem of the Greek Government towards Australia for sending men to help in the defence of Greek territory. The soil was presented to the Prime Minister of Australia, Ben Chifley.

Religious practice commenced in 1948, while the building was being completed; the church was officially opened and dedicated in June 1950. It is named after three saints called Theodore.

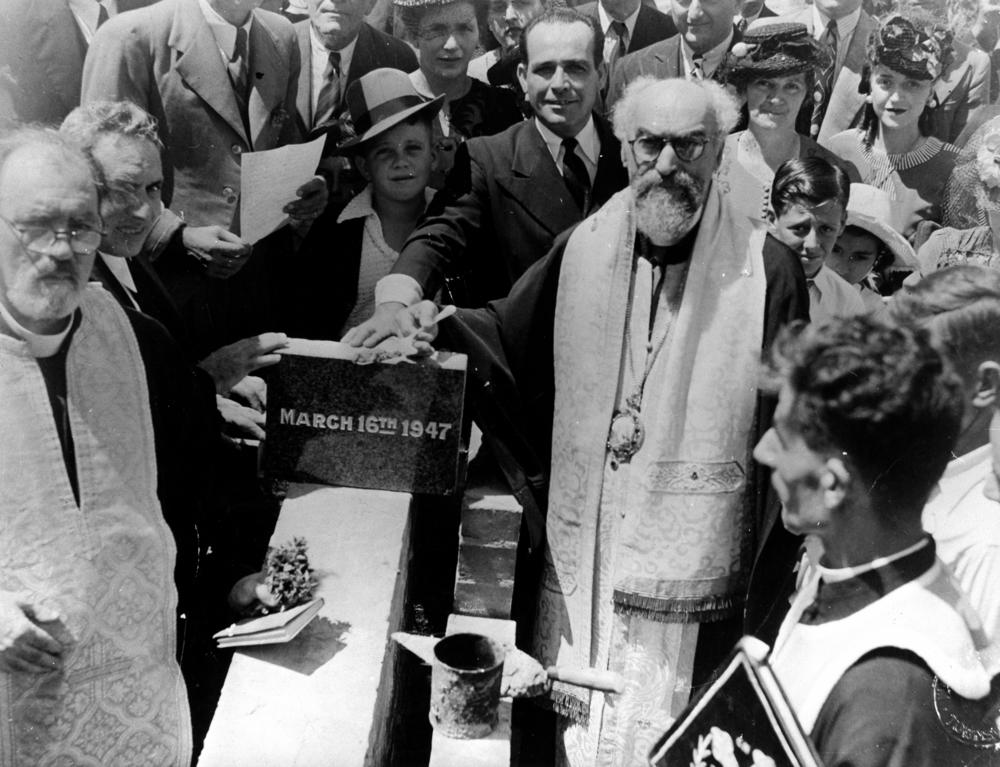
Laying of foundation stone for Sts.Theodores' Greek Orthodox Church, 1947

A history of Townsville produced several years after the official opening and dedication of Saints Theodores describes the interior of the church:

"The interior of the church follows the Byzantine style of architecture; in the congregation's section, graceful rounded columns merge into picturesque arches to support a choir gallery; from this again rise columns and arches which combine to produce a quintessence of reverend and artistic atmosphere. The portion of the church allotted to the altar rises straight to the domed roof in most effective fashion. The stranger, walking towards the altar, automatically sweeps the eyes upwards to the dome, and the effect there is startling and a trifle awe-inspiring-on the ceiling looms a painting of the Christ, hands raised in benediction and gazing straight downwards."

The religious icons painted on the plaster of the dome were undertaken by artist Angelo Manolios, who was brought from Greece (from the Island of Lesvos) for the purpose. Manolios carried out this task over twelve months, lying on his back on scaffolding specially raised for the purpose. His work across and around the altar depicts the teachings of the Orthodox Church.

The first parish priest was Father George Kateris, who served Townsville's Greek community from 1946 to 1953. Luke and Despo Lucas were the first couple married in the church, on 19 September 1948.

Saints Theodores Church was officially opened and dedicated by Metropolitan Theophylactos Papathanasopoulos in June 1950.

The church carries out activities including the provision and fostering of an Ethnic Greek School, Greek Dancing School, Hellenic Youth Association, Greek Ladies' Auxiliary, Hellenic Senior Citizens, a Greek Orthodox Church Playgroup, and Debutante Balls through the Saints Theodores Parish of Townsville.

== Description ==
Saints Theodores Greek Orthodox Church fronts onto 654 Sturt Street, Townsville.

This Church is a red brick building with a centrally located tower above the main entrance to Sturt Street.

The roof of the tower and the dome above the altar are painted white, as are the window frames on the upper section of the tower.

The Church's interior comprises the congregation's section, with a choir gallery above.

The altar and side walls comprise a series of Greek Orthodox religious paintings and icons. Above the altar is a dome which depicts Christ with outstretched hands, as well as containing representations of the Apostles.

== Heritage listing ==
Saints Theodores Greek Orthodox Church was listed on the Queensland Heritage Register on 25 August 2000 having satisfied the following criteria. Saints Theodores Greek Orthodox Church is important in demonstrating the pattern of Greek migration and settlement in Queensland, and the role of the Townsville Greek Community in meeting the needs of their Orthodox parishioners.

Saints Theodores Church demonstrates rare external and internal architecture and decoration associated with Greek Orthodox religious practice and traditions in a Queensland (or Australian) context.

This Church also exhibits particular aesthetic characteristics contributing to the streetscape of Sturt Street, Townsville, valued not only by the local Greek Orthodox parishioners, but also the Townsville and broader Queensland community.

This place has a special association with the important Greek migrant community to Queensland that developed during the 19th and 20th centuries, and now continues into the present 21st century.
