= Greek Orthodox Archdiocese of Australia and New Zealand =

The Greek Orthodox Archdiocese of Australia and New Zealand was an archdiocese of the Greek Orthodox Church in Australia and New Zealand, part of the Eastern Orthodox religion. It was a jurisdiction of the Ecumenical Patriarchate of Constantinople. The archdiocese was split in 1970 to form the 'Greek Orthodox Archdiocese of Australia' and the 'Metropolis of New Zealand'

== History ==
In March 1924, the 'Metropolis of Australia and New Zealand' was established under the Ecumenical Patriarchate. The first Metropolitan of the new province of the Ecumenical Thronos was Christoforos Knitis of Serres, who presided from 1924-1928. He was succeeded by Metropolitan Timotheos Evangelinidis from 1931 to 1947, Metropolitan Theophylactos Papathanasopoulos from 1947 to 1958 and Metropolitan Ezekiel Tsoukalas from 1959.

The Metropolis of Australia and New Zealand was elevated to an archdiocese in 1959 and Metropolitan Ezekiel was elevated to archbishop. In 1970, Ecumenical Patriarchate split the archdiocese into the Greek Orthodox Archdiocese of Australia and the Metropolis of New Zealand. Archbishop Ezekiel remained as hierarch of the Greek Orthodox Archdiocese of Australia until 1974, when he was succeeded by Stylianos Harkianakis.

== Primates in Australia and New Zealand ==
- Metropolitan Christoforos of Australia and New Zealand (1924–1929)
- Metropolitan Timotheos of Australia and New Zealand (1931–1947)
- Metropolitan Theophylactos of Australia and New Zealand (1947–1958)
- Metropolitan Ezekiel of Australia and New Zealand (1959–1974)
- Metropolitan Stylianos of Australia and New Zealand (1975–2019)
- Metropolitan Makarios of Australia (2019–)
