= Hagios Spyridon, Rhodes =

Byzantine church in Rhodes, Greece

Hagios Spyridon
- Άγιος Σπυρίδων
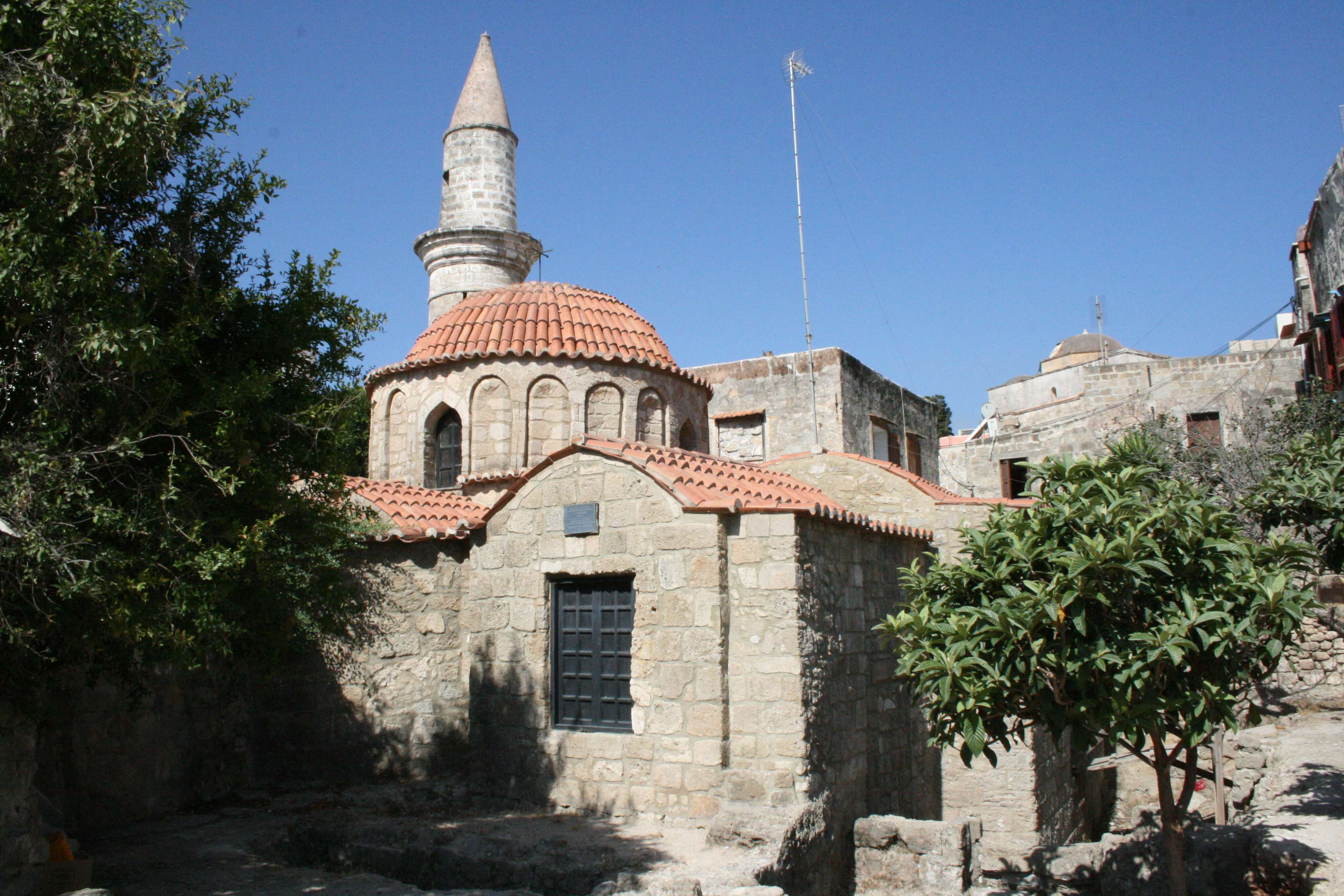

- Location of the church in Greece
- Hagios Spyridon
- 36°26′34″N 28°13′34″E
- Location: Rhodes, South Aegean
- Country: Greece
- Language: Greek
- Denomination: Greek Orthodox
- Previous denomination: Islam (1522–c. 1912)

History
- Former name(s): Turkish: Kavaklı Mescidi, lit. 'Kavakli Mosque' (as a mosque)
- Status: Church (13th century–1522); Mosque (1522–c. 1912); Church (since c. 1912– )
- Dedication: Saint Spyridon

Architecture
- Functional status: Active
- Architectural type: Church
- Style: Byzantine
- Completed: 13th century

Specifications
- Materials: Brick, stone, marble

Administration
- Metropolis: Rhodes

The Hagios Spyridon (Greek: Άγιος Σπυρίδων), officially the Church of Hagios Spyridon (Ιερός Ναός Αγίου Σπυρίδωνος), is a Greek Orthodox church located in Rhodes, in the South Aegean region of Greece. The medieval Byzantine-era church was built in the thirteenth century within the old walled city of Rhodes. During the Ottoman era, it was converted into a mosque, called in Turkish: Kavaklı Mescidi, lit. 'Kavakli Mosque', before it was returned to Christian worship in the early part of the 20th century.

== History ==
Excavations and restorations carried out in 1984 revealed that a first church was built on the ruins of a Hellenistic three-aisled building in the thirteenth century, but it is unclear who the church was dedicated to. Hagios Spyridon in its current form was erected in the sixteenth century, on top of the previous one. After the island fell to the Ottoman Turks in 1522, it was converted into a mosque, called Kavakli Mosque after the Turkish word for poplar (kavak).

It was in modern times that the 4th Ephorate of Byzantine Antiquities, during excavations, and by way of a process similar to the one adopted for the designation of the churches of Hagios Artemios and Hagia Kyriaki, decided to attribute Saint Spyridon to this church.

== Architecture ==
The first church building had a semicircular arch for the sanctuary and a floor with marble inlays and frescoes. The newer church of the sixteenth century preserved the arch and parts of the frescoes. From this period, new murals and a burial crypt with frescoes under the floor of the northern aisle are also preserved, which houses, among others, the tombs of the two founders of the church, who were father and son.

Out of the various murals decorating the interior of Hagios Spyridon, the most distinguished one is the representation of Virgin Mary the Mother of God and Staint John (dating to the early sixteenth century), flanked by two male figures in a posture of prayer. The inscriptions next to their faces reveals their names: Andreas and Georgios, presumably the father and son who financed part of the decoration of the church and who were buried in the crypt. After the Ottoman conversion to a mosque, the murals were covered and thus preserved to this day.

After its conversion, a minaret was added on the northwest corner of Hagios Spyridon, which survives whole to this day.

== See also ==
- Church of Greece
- Ancient Roman and Byzantine domes
- List of former mosques in Greece
- Knights Hospitaller
