= Holy Trinity Greek Orthodox Church, Surry Hills =

Holy Trinity Greek Orthodox Church
- Greek Orthodox Church of the Holy Trinity
- Ayia Trias
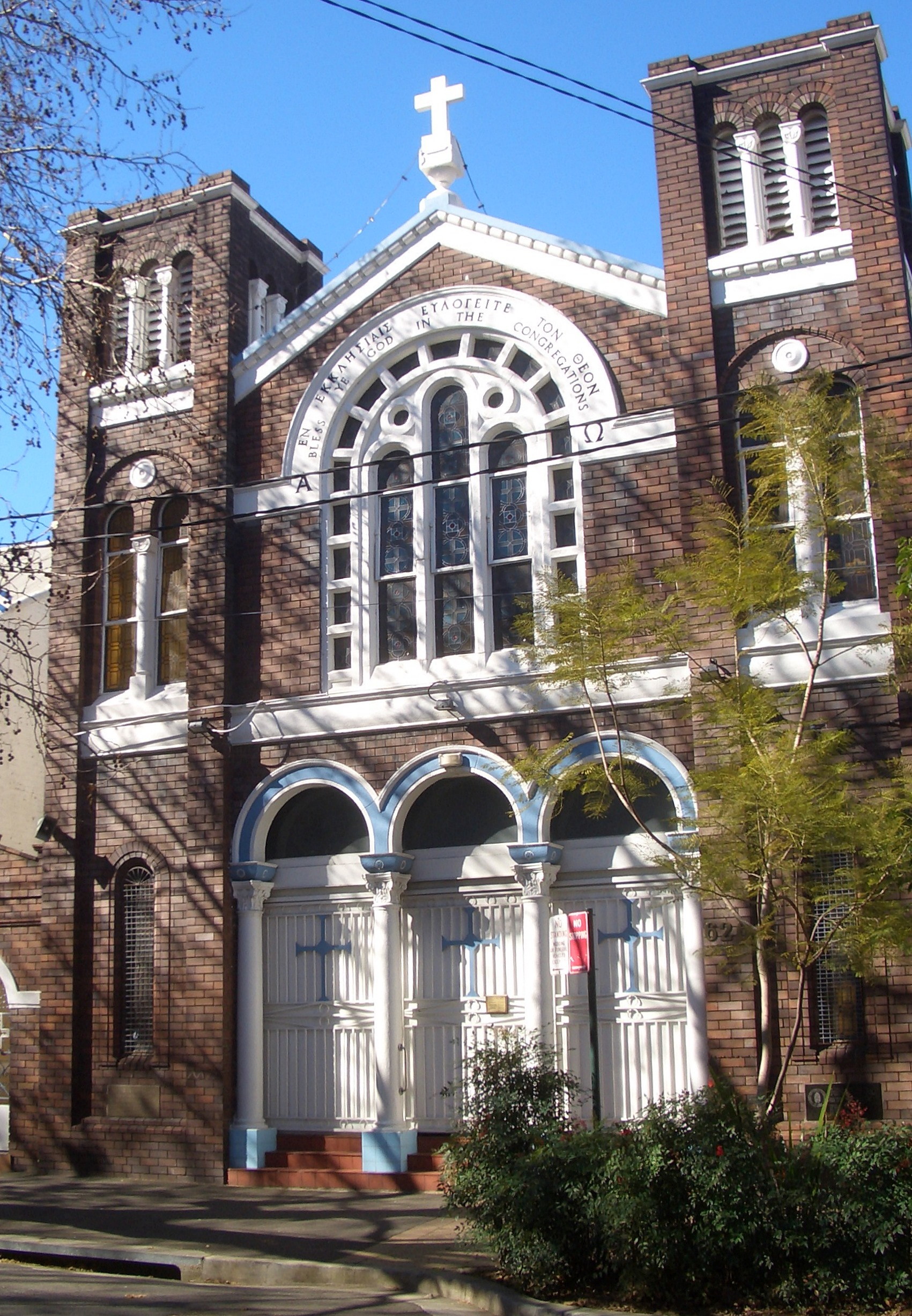
- Facade of the Holy Trinity Church, pictured in 2007.

- Location in Sydney
- 33°53′28″S 151°12′54″E
- Location: 626–630 Bourke Street, Surry Hills, City of Sydney, New South Wales
- Country: Australia
- Denomination: Greek Orthodox

History
- Founded: 29 May 1898
- Consecrated: 16 April 1899

Architecture
- Architect: C. R. Summerhayes
- Architectural type: Byzantine; Inter-War Romanesque
- Years built: 1898–1931

Administration
- Archdiocese: Australia
- Parish: Greek Orthodox Parish of the Holy Trinity

Clergy
- Priest: Rev. Thomas Giantzis

New South Wales Heritage Register
- Official name: Holy Trinity Greek Orthodox Church; Ayia Trias; Agia Triada
- Type: State heritage (built)
- Designated: 28 May 2010
- Reference no.: 1816
- Type: Church
- Category: Religion
- Builders: J. Noble

The Holy Trinity Greek Orthodox Church is a heritage-listed Greek Orthodox church building located at 626–630 Bourke Street, Surry Hills, City of Sydney, New South Wales, Australia. It was designed by C. R. Summerhayes and built from 1898 to 1931 by J. Noble. It is also known as Ayia Trias and Agia Triada. The property is owned by Greek Orthodox Community of NSW. It was added to the New South Wales State Heritage Register on 28 May 2010.

== History ==
Orthodoxy arrived in Australia in the late nineteenth century when significant numbers of Greek, Lebanese and Russian immigrants made their way here from their homelands. The early migrants were attracted to Australia for a number of reasons, but particularly by the prospect of a new land and the chance to better their lives by amassing their fortunes in a developing settlement. Although the Lebanese migrants, known originally as Syrians, made a more permanent move by bringing their families and culture with them, the Greek migrants saw their Australian experience as a temporary measure to build their financial security before returning home to the Motherland and their families in Greece. As such, these migrants were largely young single men with no intention of settling in Australia or at least not until they were financially well established and could bring their wives and families from Greece to join them. For the majority, however, Australia was a place where they could make a fortune and then return to Greece to enjoy the hard-earned fruits of their labour.

When some did return home to Greece, news of Australia spread and chain migration began with family and friends of migrants going abroad to join them. As migration continued, a community developed in Australia with the implementation of the necessary organisations and structures needed to support the new immigrants who were still, overwhelmingly, single men with little to no understanding of the language and with few marketable employment skills. This institutional structure was important to the new migrants in helping them get established in a new country and integrate into their own community and the broader Australian society while maintaining their traditions, values and cultural identity.

The migration experience was a binding force within these communities and these newly established institutions were able to provide food, shelter, supplies and a stable family-type environment for the migrants that followed. These strong connections promoted ethnic unity and enabled the newly settled communities to sustain the cultural and religious practices brought with them from their homeland, as well as being an inclusive unit that could withstand the cultural and social isolation of the new country. Through the assistance of these communities, the new migrants tended to settle in clusters and, with the Greek and Lebanese communities, these areas were Surry Hills, Waterloo and Redfern (which was to become the hub of Orthodox immigration by the late nineteenth century).

Religious institutions were also particularly important in the experiences and settlement of the new immigrants in Australia. In the very early days of the migration of Orthodox Greeks, Lebanese and Russians, there were no dedicated churches in which the migrants could worship but the celebration of major religious holidays (particularly Christmas and Easter) did continue through makeshift services being conducted by travelling priests.

For the continuation of the Orthodox faith, however, this pattern of worship was far from ideal. In 1897, led by Athanassios Cominos, an interim committee was established with the intention of founding the Greek Community of NSW in Sydney as well as working towards the construction of a dedicated Greek Orthodox church to service the needs of the growing community. Particularly amongst the Greek community, a legitimate church was essential in ensuring that their religious celebrations were recognised both in the new community and also back in Greece. There was a significant fear in the community that marriages would not be valid in the Motherland if they were not conducted in a recognised religious institution by an appointed Orthodox priest. To counter these growing concerns, the community decided to attract a Greek priest to Australia, largely through the construction of the first dedicated Greek Orthodox church in Australia.

In the meantime however, the Orthodox Greeks turned to the Anglican Church who opened the doors of the St James Parish Hall in Sydney to be available for regular Orthodox worship, pending the construction of a Greek Orthodox Church. These services were conducted by Archimandrite Dorotheos Bakaliaros who, from 1895, was the first Greek Orthodox priest in Australia to administer religious services to the communities of Sydney and Melbourne. During this period, Archimandrite Dorotheos also encouraged the construction of a dedicated church for the parishioners and, in late 1897, fund-raising efforts had begun. Within six months, the land had been donated by Ioannis Cominos (the brother of Athanassios), and donations of A£390 had been collected from the Orthodox community to go towards the building project.

The first step in the construction of the Holy Trinity (Ayia Trias) Church, this being the first Greek Orthodox place of worship in Australia, was the laying of the foundation stones in an official ceremony on 29 May 1898. This date is significant in the history of Orthodoxy, being the date the Byzantine Empire in Constantinople fell to the Ottoman Turks in 1453 and it has since become the date on which all Holy Trinity churches are founded. Through this tradition, 29 May has also become the date that represents the courageous extension of Hellenism and Orthodoxy around the world.

The ceremony to lay the three foundation stones in 1898 was presided over by Archimandrite Dorotheous, who conducted the service in Greek, and was attended by the Consuls-General of Greece and France, the Consuls of Russia, Argentina and Sweden and a large congregation of Orthodox Greeks and Lebanese. The three stones were laid (two in opposite corners, and one in the centre where the altar would be placed) and within each stone was placed a small iron cross, a bottle of holy water and a collection of English and Greek silver coins.

The fund-raising efforts continued at the ceremony with a further A£190 collected. Along with the money already raised, the construction of the Holy Trinity Church was underway and, by 1899, it was completed and furnished for a total of A£848 and eight shillings. For another A£454 11s, the community also built a residence for the priest adjacent to the church.

The Holy Trinity Church was constructed with the intention that it would be a place of worship for the Orthodox faith, whether its congregation was Greek, Lebanese or Russian. All doctrinal groups were acknowledged by the Ecumenical Council of Constantinople and so were regarded as sister churches within the Orthodox faith. Financial contributions towards the construction of the Holy Trinity Church were also made by Lebanese migrants, some of whom also served within official positions in the Orthodox community.

With a newly built church serving such a diverse congregation, the Holy Trinity Church was in need of a bilingual priest and, after approaching the Patriarchate of Jerusalem, Father Serafeim Phocas was appointed as the first accredited resident Orthodox priest for the Holy Trinity Church. Arriving in Sydney in March 1899, Fr Serafeim, along with Fr Athanassios Kantopoulos from Melbourne, led the Easter and official consecration ceremonies at the Holy Trinity Church on 16 April 1899. For a community of only approximately 500 faithful, the erection and consecration of a designated church and priest residence was a great achievement for Sydney's developing Orthodox community.

During Fr Serafeim's term as the resident priest at the Holy Trinity Church, he officiated in hundreds of religious ceremonies. However, he was obliged to step down from his position in 1913 due to bad health. During his term, however, relations between the Orthodox Greeks, Lebanese and Russians had remained cordial but with a revised constitution adopted in 1914 and the transfer of spiritual allegiance from the Patriarchate of Jerusalem to the Church of Greece, membership at the Holy Trinity Church became limited to those of Greek descent only. This caused tension within the diverse congregation and, as such, the Lebanese and Russian Orthodox members received strong encouragement to seek an alternative location for worship. Although regular services continued to be held at the Holy Trinity Church for some time, when the St George Antiochian Orthodox Cathedral in Redfern was opened by the Orthodox Lebanese members in 1920, official relations between the groups came to an end. The Orthodox Russians also followed suit, moving from the Holy Trinity Church at a similar time to hold their services at the St George Cathedral.

With the retirement of Fr Serafeim, the leaders of the Greek Orthodox Community approached the Church of Greece for another priest to serve the congregation and, in late 1913, Fr Dimitrios Marinakis arrived in Sydney. Fr Marinakis served as the resident priest at the Holy Trinity Church for some 10 years but, during this time, the church and its community experienced the beginning of the friction that would play a significant role in its history. During his term, Fr Marinakis was accused of being preoccupied with money and his business activities, to the detriment of his duties to the church and the school that taught the traditional culture and the modern Greek language to the children of the congregation. Fr Marinakis withstood much of this criticism but, after losing the support of the Greek Orthodox Community, was dismissed in 1923 and replaced by Fr Athinagoras Varaklas. Fr Varaklas was to become the central figure in the division within the Community and the church's congregation that was to shape the Orthodox history in Australia over the next 10 years.

From the early years of the twentieth century, the Orthodox Greeks in Australia had been under the spiritual jurisdiction of the Church of Greece, an autocephalous branch of the Ecumenical Patriarchate of Constantinople. In an effort to reclaim its authority over the Australian Orthodox branches, the Ecumenical Patriarchate established the Greek Orthodox Metropolis of Australia and New Zealand in 1924 and appointed Dr Christoforos Knitis as the Metropolitan. This action caused an intense dispute between the Greek Community of Sydney and the new religious authority, the Greek Orthodox Metropolis of Australia and New Zealand, thus dividing the community into those in support and those opposing the Metropolitan.

Over the next few years, Metropolita Knitis and the Holy Trinity Church experienced many turbulent times and conflict between these opposing factions. So much so, the Metropolita Knitis and his supporters established a separate church, Saint Sophia Cathedral (Ayia Sofia) in Paddington in 1927. This definitive split in the Orthodox Community was also a result of Fr Varaklas not recognising or accepting Knitis or the authority of the newly formed Metropolis and his refusal to step down from his duties at the Holy Trinity Church. Varaklas and his supporters, the anti-MetropArchbishop faction, maintained that he was the parish priest at the Holy Trinity Church and that he would continue to lead its religious services. With the break between the factions and the move of the Metropolita and his supporters to the St Sophia Cathedral, Fr Varaklas was able to resume his priestly responsibilities and did so until he left Australia for the US, with significant honours by the Community and his congregation, in 1932.

With the departure of Metropolita Knitis in 1928 and the subsequent term of Metropolita Timotheos Evagelinides from 1932 to 1947, significant efforts were made to reconcile the opposing factions. However, there was considerable hesitation from the Holy Trinity Church in that, by reconciling with St Sophia Cathedral, the Holy Trinity Church would, along with conceding some administrative dominance, take on joint responsibility for the significant financial debt St Sophia Cathedral had acquired during its construction. At the time, St Sophia Cathedral was A£4,800 in debt and the trustees at the Holy Trinity Church were concerned that that amount would bankrupt the church. However, after a prolonged period of co-existence, the two churches were finally reconciled into the one Community, the Greek Orthodox Community of Sydney and NSW, in April 1945.

== Description ==
The Holy Trinity Greek Orthodox Church is aesthetically distinctive and prominent in its streetscape. Originally built in the Byzantine style of architecture (perhaps reflective of how highly the founding congregation regarded their Byzantine Christian heritage, the church was constructed to hold up to 400 patrons. In 1931, the facade of the church was replaced with a two-storey Inter-War Romanesque construction of face brick with rendered dressings, buttresses and a gable roof. As a result of these alterations, the entrance to the church is now framed by two brick towers and is headed by an arched leadlight window above a triple arched entranceway. The original facade is, however, still discernable upon entering the foyer of the church.

The interior of the church is well decorated with representations and symbols of iconography. There are also a number of original artefacts still in use including the altar, the main chandelier (as well as a number of others), a selection of hanging lamps and two candle stands inscribed with the date of donation (1899). An extensive collection of original artefacts is currently housed at the office of the Greek Orthodox Community of NSW Ltd in a museum/archival resource centre.

=== Condition ===
The church is in very good condition with a high degree of original fabric (including the altar, a number of chandeliers, a selection of hanging lamps and two candle stands).

The church is in very good condition with a high degree of intact original fabric.

=== Modifications and dates ===
The facade of the church was replaced with an Inter-War Romanesque construction in 1931. The priest's residence at the rear of the property has undergone a complete internal renovation.

== Heritage listing ==
The Ayia Trias (Holy Trinity) Greek Orthodox Church has state significance as the first dedicated Greek Orthodox church to be built in Australia. Constructed in 1898 to serve the growing migrant Orthodox community in Sydney, the Holy Trinity Church (along with the land it sits on and the adjacent priest's residence) was funded entirely by the congregation. Since the late nineteenth century when the early members migrated and settled in Sydney, the church has been a centre of stability to its congregation and a place where people could meet and practice their traditional culture, values and language. The subsequent interaction and support network was essential to the settlement of these communities in Australia and, as a result, the Holy Trinity Greek Orthodox Church has been a dedicated place for Christian Orthodox worship for over 100 years.

Holy Trinity Greek Orthodox Church was listed on the New South Wales State Heritage Register on 28 May 2010 having satisfied the following criteria.

The place is important in demonstrating the course, or pattern, of cultural or natural history in New South Wales.

The Holy Trinity Greek Orthodox Church has State significance as the first Greek Orthodox Church established in Australia and the Southern Hemisphere. Built in 1898, this church played an important role in the settlement of immigrant communities in Sydney in the late nineteenth century. The church provided an institutional structure to support the migrants while being a communal venue through which they could maintain the traditional culture, values and language of their homeland.

The place has a strong or special association with a person, or group of persons, of importance of cultural or natural history of New South Wales's history.

The Holy Trinity Greek Orthodox Church has State significance for its association with the migrant communities that settled in Australia, particularly in Sydney, in the late nineteenth century. Originally, these groups were largely made up of Christian Orthodox Greeks, Lebanese and Russians and, when they arrived, there were no religious or social institutions to support them as they settled into a new country. The migration experience was a binding force within these groups and together they established, among other things, the Holy Trinity Greek Orthodox Church to service the needs of the growing community. Religion had an important role during this settlement period because the church was an institution through which the new migrants could practice and maintain their traditional culture, values and language. Developing a united community was also important for social interaction and support and the church became a centre of stability for these migrant groups in the Australian society.

The place is important in demonstrating aesthetic characteristics and/or a high degree of creative or technical achievement in New South Wales.

As many religious buildings in NSW, the Holy Trinity Greek Orthodox Church is aesthetically distinctive in its streetscape. The facade of the church was altered in 1931 and replaced with an Inter-War Romanesque design, headed by an arched leadlight window over a triple arched doorway. However, although it has undergone some modification, the design and scale of the Holy Trinity Greek Orthodox Church ensures the building maintains its prominent position in the streetscape and in the community.

The place has a strong or special association with a particular community or cultural group in New South Wales for social, cultural or spiritual reasons.

The Holy Trinity Greek Orthodox Church has State significance for the important role it has played, and continues to play, in the lives of the Orthodox community in Sydney. For the early migrants who knew very little of Australia, the church was significant in helping them to settle into the community while being a venue through which they could practice and sustain their traditional culture, values and language. Being the first Orthodox church established in Australia, the Holy Trinity Church represented a centre of stability in the lives of these new immigrants and provided a unified institution that could counter their feelings of social and cultural isolation. Today, over 100 years since the early days of its establishment, the Holy Trinity Church continues to play a role in the Greek-Australian experience as a spiritual centre for Christian Orthodox worship in NSW.

The place has potential to yield information that will contribute to an understanding of the cultural or natural history of New South Wales.

Although the Holy Trinity Greek Orthodox Church was the first to be established in Australia, it does not appear to have potential to reveal further information that would contribute to a great understanding of the site.

The church does, however, have a number of both decorative and practical artefacts that date from the period of construction. Further analysis of these items could provide insight into the origins of the church and the period in which it was built.

The place possesses uncommon, rare or endangered aspects of the cultural or natural history of New South Wales.

The presence of a number of Greek Orthodox churches in Sydney and NSW ensures that the Holy Trinity Greek Orthodox Church is not rare in NSW today. However, being a foundational church, it is uniquely significant.

The place is important in demonstrating the principal characteristics of a class of cultural or natural places/environments in New South Wales.

The Holy Trinity Greek Orthodox Church has State significance as a representative example of an Orthodox church in NSW. Holy Trinity, in itself, is a doctrine that underlies all theology and spirituality in the Orthodox faith and its foundation, on 29 May, is representative of the day the Byzantine Empire fell to the Ottoman Turks in 1453 (this is also the date that all Holy Trinity Churches in the world are founded).

Although the Holy Trinity Greek Orthodox Church was the first of its kind in Australia, it is representative of religious buildings in Sydney that were built to service the needs of the community. Churches have always played an integral role in the community as places where people can meet and sustain their social, cultural and religious practices. As well as this, the Holy Trinity Church is also significant for the role it has played in providing stability in the newly settled immigrant communities.

== See also ==
- Saint Sophia Cathedral, Sydney
- Greek Orthodox Archdiocese of Australia
- Greek Orthodox churches in New South Wales
