= List of Greek Orthodox churches in New South Wales =

Islington This is a list of Greek Orthodox parishes and monasteries in New South Wales (NSW) and the Australian Capital Territory (ACT), in Australia.

== Greek Orthodox Archdiocese of Australia ==
The majority of Greek Orthodox church communities in New South Wales and the Australian Capital Territory are under the spiritual jurisdiction of the Greek Orthodox Archdiocese of Australia. These church communities are under the Archdiocese's First Archdiocesan District of New South Wales and the Australian Capital Territory which consists of 45 parishes, one cathedral, one chapel and three monasteries.

Archbishop Makarios (Griniezakis) of Australia leads the Archdiocesan District of Sydney and is assisted by Bishop Iakovos of Miletoupolis and Bishop Christodoulos of Magnesia as well as Chancellor of the Archdiocese, Archimandrite of the Ecumenical Throne, Reverend Christophoros Krikelis. Parishes located in and around the Australian Capital Territory, as well as rural parishes in Southern NSW are led by Bishop Bartholomew of Charioupolis. The Greek Orthodox Archdiocese of Australia is a jurisdiction of the Ecumenical Patriarchate of Constantinople.

The First Archdiocesan District covers many church communities including some of Australia's most populous areas such as Sydney, Canberra, Newcastle, Wollongong, the Central Coast and multiple regional areas of New South Wales and the Australian Capital Territory. Churches and monasteries under the First Archdiocesan District are listed below:

=== Parishes and monasteries ===
| Name | Year Founded | Suburb / Town | Street Address | Picture | Comment |
|---|---|---|---|---|---|
| Greek Orthodox Church of the Archangels | 1964 | Albury | 378 Olive Street | | Fortnightly services rotating with Wagga Wagga Parish |
| Orthodox Parish of St. Savvas of Kalymnos | 2015 | Banksia | 316 Princes Highway | | Multilingual Ukrainian/Greek Parish Integrated into the Archdiocese March 2022 |
| Greek Orthodox Parish of St. Euphemia | 1963 | Bankstown | 6–12 East Terrace | | |
| Greek Orthodox Parish of St. John the Forerunner & Baptist | 2001 | Batemans Bay | 6 Clyde Road | | No permeant priest, served by priests from Sydney or Canberra |
| Greek Orthodox Parish of All Saints | 1964 | Belmore | 31 Isabel Street | | |
| Greek Orthodox Parish of Sts. Paraskevi & Barbara | 1982 | Blacktown | 47–49 Balmoral Street | | |
| Greek Orthodox Parish of St. Nectarios | 1967 | Burwood | 26 Railway Parade | | |
| Greek Orthodox Parish of St. Dionysios | 1976 | Central Mangrove | 1639 Nurses Road | | Gosford area |
| Greek Orthodox Parish of Sts. Michael & Gabriel | 1962 | Crows Nest | 49–59 Holtermann Street | | |
| Greek Orthodox Parish of the Dormition of the Theotokos | 1957 | Darlington | 360 Abercrombie Street | | |
| Greek Orthodox Church of Our Lady of the Myrtle Tree | 1962 | Dubbo | 15A Roper Street | | No permeant priest, served by priests from Sydney |
| Greek Orthodox Parish of the Transfiguration of Our Lord | 1976 | Earlwood | 175 Bayview Avenue | | |
| Greek Orthodox Dependency Chapel of St. Arsenios | 1982 | Earlwood | 42 Bayview Avenue | | Dependency Chapel of the Monastery of Panagia Pantanassa |
| Greek Orthodox Parish of St. Andrew | 1979 | Gladesville | 20 Wharf Road | | |
| Greek Orthodox Church of St. Panteleimon | 1976 | Goulburn | 11 MacAlister Drive | | |
| Greek Orthodox Parish of St. Stylianos | 1996 | Gymea | 806–808 The Kingsway | | |
| Greek Orthodox Parish of the Holy Apostles | 1961 | Hamilton | 11–17 Steel Street | | |
| Greek Orthodox Parish of St. Stephanos | 1982 | Hurlstone Park | 650 New Canterbury Road | | |
| Greek Orthodox Parish of St. Spyridon | 1961 | Kingsford | 72–76 Gardeners Road | | |
| Greek Orthodox Parish of St. Nicholas | 1969 | Kingston | Cnr Wentworth Avenue & Telopea Park | | ACT, in Canberra area |
| Greek Orthodox Parish of the Resurrection of Our Lord | 1965 | Kogarah | 16–18 Belgrave Street | | |
| Greek Orthodox Parish of St. Gerasimos | 1963 | Leichhardt | 21 Henry Street | | |
| Greek Orthodox Parish of Sts. Raphael, Nicolaos & Irene | 1967 | Liverpool | 29 Forbes Street | | |
| Greek Orthodox Monastery of Panagia Pantanassa | 2005 | Mangrove Creek | 567 Mangrove Creek Road | | Male Monastery |
| Greek Orthodox Monastery of the Holy Cross | 1995 | Mangrove Mountain | 1 Holy Cross Road | | Female Monastery |
| Greek Orthodox Parish of St. Nicholas | 1961 | Marrickville | 203–207 Livingstone Road | | |
| Greek Orthodox Parish of St. Catherine | 1980 | Mascot | 180 Coward Street | | |
| Ukrainian Orthodox Parish of Sts. Basil the Great & St George | 1960 | Islington | 34 Morgan Street | | Integrated into the Archdiocese March 2022 |
| Greek Orthodox Parish of Sts. Constantine & Helen | 1968 | Newtown | 378 King Street | | |
| Greek Orthodox Church of St. Catherine | 2019 | Orange | 46 McNamara Street | | No permeant priest, served by priests from Sydney |
| Greek Orthodox Cathedral of St. Sophia & God's Wisdom | 1926 | Paddington | 302 South Dowling Street | | The Original Greek Orthodox Cathedral in Australia |
| Greek Orthodox Parish of St. John the Forerunner | 1960 | Parramatta | 163–165 George Street | | Image of former church on Hassall Street |
| Greek Orthodox Parish of St. Demetrios | 1993 | Queanbeyan | 120 Campbell Street | | |
| Greek Orthodox Cathedral of the Annunciation of the Theotokos | 1967 | Redfern | 242 Cleveland Street | | Cathedral since 22 November 1970 |
| Greek Orthodox Chapel of St. Athanasios | 1991 | Rookwood | Cnr Weekes Avenue & Carpenter Avenue | | Image prior to facade renovations |
| Greek Orthodox Parish of St. George | 1962 | Rose Bay | 90 Newcastle Street | | |
| Greek Orthodox Parish of St. Demetrios | 1970 | St Marys | 47 Hobart Street | | |
| Greek Orthodox Parish of the Holy Trinity | 1898 | Surry Hills | 411A Bourke Street | | First Greek Orthodox Church in Australia |
| Greek Orthodox Parish of St. Sophia | 1974 | Surry Hills | 626 Bourke Street | | |
| Greek Orthodox Church of St. Demetrios | 1975 | Tamworth | 21 North Street | | No permeant priest, served by priests from Sydney |
| Greek Orthodox Parish of St. Therapon | 2006 | Thornleigh | 323–325 Pennant Hills Road | | |
| Greek Orthodox Parish of St. Haralambos | 2014 | Tuggerah | 4 Fleet Close | | |
| Greek Orthodox Church of the Dormition of the Theotokos | 1965 | Wagga Wagga | 24–26 Tompson Street | | Fortnightly services rotating with Albury Parish |
| Greek Orthodox Parish of the Holy Cross | 1954 | Wollongong | 18 Stewart Street | | |
| Greek Orthodox Parish of St. Nectarios | 1972 | Wollongong | 39 Atchison Street | | Rejoined the Archdiocese in November 2020 |
| Greek Orthodox Church of St. John the Forerunner & Baptist | 1964 | Worrowing Heights | 35 Birriga Avenue | | Jervis Bay area, no permeant priest, served by priests from Sydney |
| Greek Orthodox Monastery of St. George | 1962 | Yellow Rock | 316 Singles Ridge Road | | Male Monastery |

== Other Greek Orthodox Church jurisdictions ==
There are few smaller Greek Orthodox church community organisations in New South Wales and the Australian Capital Territory that are governed by other church organisations or independent bodies. These church communities are listed below:

| Name | Suburb / Town | Street Address | Picture | Comment |
|---|---|---|---|---|
| Greek Orthodox Church of the Dormition of the Theotokos | Bexley | 40 Kenyon Road | Greek Orthodox Church of the Dormition of the Theotokos | Old Calendar Church under the Metropolitan of the True Orthodox Church of Cyprus |
| Greek Orthodox Church of Sts. Cosmas & Damianos | Dulwich Hill | 28 Hercules Street | | Old Calendar Church under the Church of the Genuine Orthodox Christians of Greece |
| Greek Orthodox Monastery of the Elevation of the Holy Cross | Guildford | 9 Cross Street | | Old Calendar Church under the Church of the Genuine Orthodox Christians of Greece |
| Greek Orthodox Church of St. Demetrios | Hamilton East | 25–27 Skelton Street | | Greek Orthodox Church under the Autocephalous Greek Orthodox Church of America and Australia |
| Greek Orthodox Church of All Saints | Kaleen | 1 Rubicon Street | All Saints Greek Orthodox church | Old Calendar Church under the Metropolitan of the True Orthodox Church of Cyprus. ACT, in Canberra area |
| Greek Orthodox Church of the Holy Protection | Merrylands | 33 Holroyd Road | | Old Calendar Church under the Holy Metropolis of Ancient Patristic Tradition of Sydney & N.S.W |
| Greek Orthodox Holy Monastery of St. Fanourios | Bungonia | 1123 Jerrara Road | | Old Calendar Monastery under the Holy Metropolis of Ancient Patristic Tradition of Sydney & N.S.W |
| Greek Orthodox Holy Monastery of St. Irene of Chrysolovantou | Bungonia | 1123 Jerrara Road | | Old Calendar Monastery under the Holy Metropolis of Ancient Patristic Tradition of Sydney & N.S.W. |

== See also ==
- Autocephalous Greek Orthodox Church of America and Australia
- Greek Australians
- Greek Old Calendarists
- Greek Orthodox Churches in South Australia and the Northern Territory
