= St George College, South Australia =

Coordinates: 34°55′22″S 138°34′15″E

St George College

Location
- 75 Rose St, Mile End; Adelaide, South Australia, 5031

Information
- Type: Private, mixed-sex education, day school
- Motto: Greek: Aien Aapiσteyein (Forever Excelling)
- Denomination: Eastern Orthodox
- Established: 1983; 43 years ago
- Principal: Guy Cassarchis
- Website: sgc.sa.edu.au

St George College is the first Eastern Orthodox school in Adelaide, South Australia. The co-educational college, established in 1983, operates under the auspices of the Greek Orthodox Archdiocese of Australia and is sponsored by the Orthodox community. The original school, now the junior school, is on the corner of Rose Street and Dew Street in the suburb of Mile End. The senior school is located close by, on the corner of Henley Beach Road and South Road, on the site of the former Thebarton Primary School.
