= Apostolos Dimelis =

Apostolos II (Greek: Απόστολος Β'; Archangelos, 1922 – Rhodes, 22 September 2010), born Panagiotis Dimelis (Παναγιώτης Διμέλης), was the Greek Orthodox metropolitan bishop of Rhodes, Greece from 5 May 1988 until his resignation on 20 April 2004, and before that titular metropolitan of Ilioupolis and Theira in Turkey, from 17 November 1977 until 15 October 1985.

== Notes ==
Eastern Orthodox Church titles
Preceded by Polyeuktos Finfinis	Metropolitan of Ilioupolis and Theira; 17 November 1977 – 15 October 1985	Succeeded by Athanasios Papas
Preceded by Spyridon Synodinos	Metropolitan of Rhodes; 5 May 1988 – 20 April 2004	Succeeded by Cyril II Kogerakis
