= Saint Sophia Cathedral, Sydney =

- Greek Orthodox Cathedral of Saint Sophia
- Agia Sophia
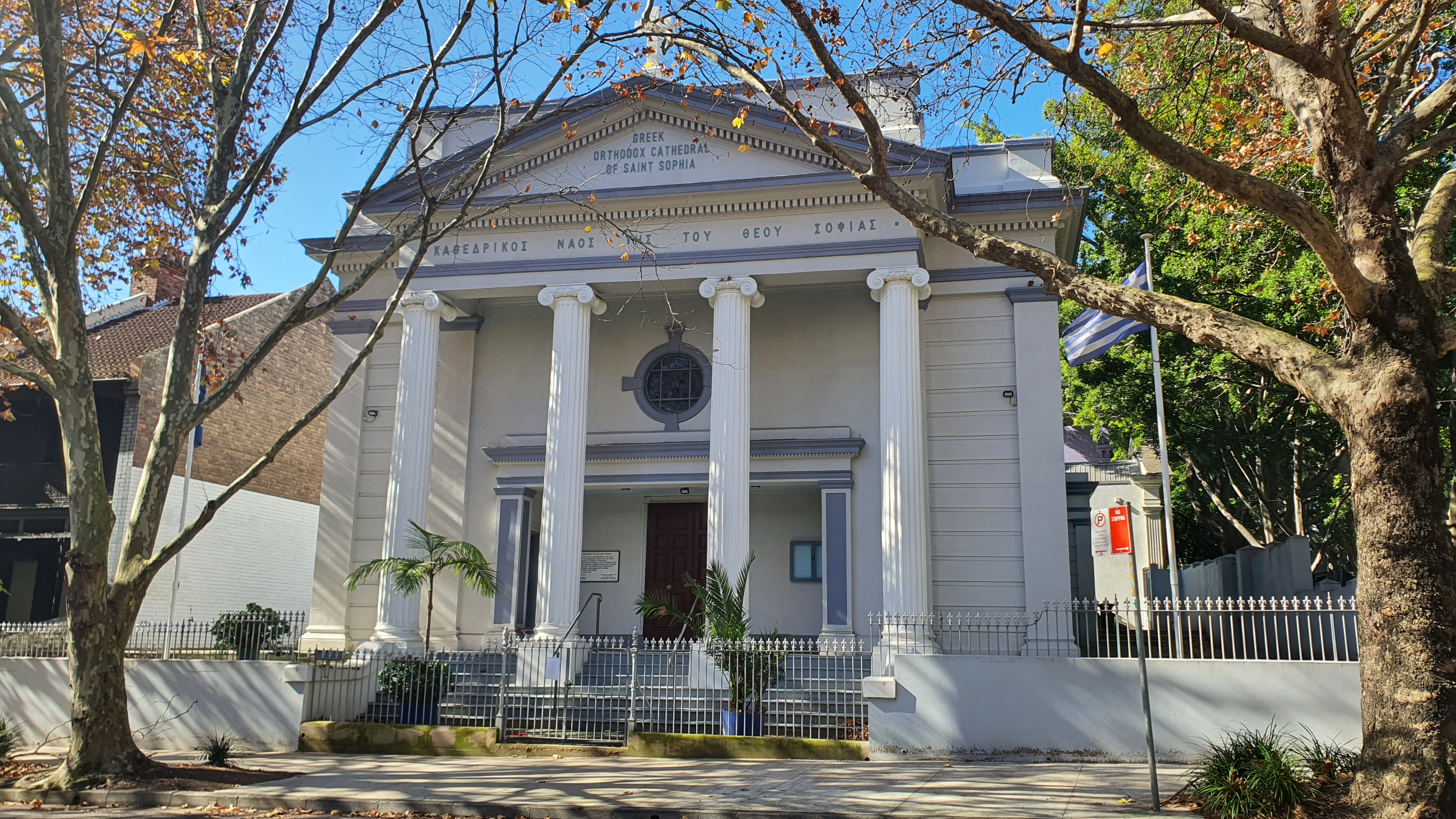
- Saint Sophia Cathedral, pictured in 2009
- Saint Sophia Cathedral, Sydney
- 33°52′59″S 151°13′08″E
- Location: 302–304 South Dowling Street, Paddington, City of Sydney, New South Wales
- Country: Australia
- Denomination: Greek Orthodox

History
- Status: Cathedral
- Dedication: The Holy Wisdom, a reference to the second person of the Holy Trinity, or Jesus Christ
- Dedicated: 18 September 1927
- Consecrated: 1928

Architecture
- Functional status: Active
- Architect: Walter Leslie
- Architectural type: Cathedral
- Style: Inter-war Academic Classical
- Years built: 1926–1930

Administration
- Province: Greek Orthodox Community of Sydney and NSW
- Archdiocese: Australia

Clergy
- Priest: Rev. Stavros Agoroudis

New South Wales Heritage Register
- Official name: The Greek Orthodox Cathedral of Saint Sophia (Agia Sophia); Cathedral of Holy Wisdom; Cathedral of God's Wisdom
- Type: State heritage (built)
- Designated: 18 March 2016
- Reference no.: 1968
- Type: Cathedral
- Category: Religion
- Builders: W. Robins

The Greek Orthodox Cathedral of Saint Sophia is a heritage-listed Greek school, Greek Orthodox cathedral and Greek venue for social activities located at 302–304 South Dowling Street, Paddington, City of Sydney, New South Wales, Australia. It was designed by Walter Leslie and built from 1926 to 1930 by W. Robins. It is also known as Saint Sophia Cathedral, the Greek Orthodox Cathedral of Saint Sophia (Agia Sophia), the Cathedral of Holy Wisdom and the Cathedral of God's Wisdom. The property is owned by Greek Orthodox Community of NSW. It was added to the New South Wales State Heritage Register on 18 March 2016.

== History ==
The site where Saint Sophia Cathedral now stands was originally part of the Sydney Common, between the present site of Centennial Park and Oxford Street. It passed through several periods of ownership including the Wesleyan Association (1866–1908) and the Jewish Society (1914–1923). The Greek Orthodox Community NSW (established 1898) has been and continues to be responsible for the management and maintenance of the Saint Sophia Cathedral, as well as the Holy Trinity Church, the first Greek Orthodox Church in Australia (consecrated 1898), located in Bourke Street, Surry Hills and the Assumption of the Virgin Mary Church (consecrated 1956), located in Abercrombie Street, Redfern.

Orthodoxy arrived in NSW in the mid-to-late nineteenth century when significant numbers of Greek, Lebanese and Russian immigrants made their way to Australia from their homelands. The early migrants were attracted to Australia for a number of reasons, but particularly by the prospect of a new land and the chance to better their lives by amassing their fortunes in a developing settlement. Although the Lebanese migrants made a more permanent move by bringing their families and culture with them, the Greek migrants saw their Australian experience as a temporary measure to build their financial security before returning home to the Motherland and their families in Greece. As such, these migrants were largely young single men with no intention of settling in Australia or at least not until they were financially well established and could bring their wives and families from Greece to join them. For the majority, however, Australia was a place where they could make a fortune and then return to Greece to enjoy the hard-earned fruits of their labour.

When some did return home to Greece, news of Australia spread and chain migration began with family and friends of migrants going abroad to join them. As migration continued, a community developed in Australia with the implementation of the necessary organisations and structures needed to support the new immigrants who were still, overwhelmingly, single men with little to no understanding of the language and with few marketable employment skills. This institutional structure was important to the new migrants in helping them get established in a new country and integrate into their own community and the broader Australian society while maintaining their traditions, values and cultural identity.

The migration experience was a binding force within these communities and these newly-established institutions were able to provide food, shelter, supplies and a stable family-type environment for the migrants that followed. These strong connections promoted ethnic unity and enabled the newly-settled communities to sustain the cultural and religious practices brought with them from their homeland, as well as being an inclusive unit that could withstand the cultural and social isolation of the new country. Through the assistance of these communities, the new migrants tended to settle in clusters and, with the Greek and Lebanese communities, these areas were Surry Hills, Waterloo and Redfern (which was to become the hub of Orthodox immigration by the late nineteenth century).

Religious institutions were particularly important in the experiences and settlement of the new immigrants in Australia. In the very early days of the migration of Orthodox Greeks, Lebanese and Russians, there were no dedicated churches in which the migrants could worship but the celebration of major religious holidays (particularly Christmas and Easter) did continue through makeshift services being conducted by travelling priests.

For the continuation of the Orthodox faith, however, this pattern of worship was far from ideal and, in 1897, the Sydney Greek Orthodox Community (now the Greek Orthodox Community of Sydney and NSW) was established with the intention of constructing the first dedicated Greek Orthodox church to service the needs of the growing community. The first of its kind in Australia, the Holy Trinity Greek Orthodox Church (Ayia Trias) was established in Surry Hills in 1898.

The faith of the early Greek settlers in Australia came largely under the jurisdiction of the Patriarchate of Jerusalem followed by the Church of Greece. However, due to a change in spiritual leadership within the community in 1924 with the arrival of the Ecumenical Patriarchate of Constantinople, tensions began developing within the Greek Australian Orthodox community. Divisions began to form between those supportive of change and those against and quickly the social and political schism within the community grew.

In 1924, as the schism reached its defining point, the Patriarchate established the Greek Orthodox Metropolis of Australia and New Zealand (which was later elevated to the Archdiocese of Australia in 1959) and began leading religious services away from Sydney's centre for the Greek Orthodox faith at Ayia Triada, Surry Hills (Holy Trinity Greek Orthodox Church). The new metropolis looked to establish its own centre and fundraising began for the erection of a new church, the Saint Sophia Greek Orthodox Cathedral (Ayia Sofia) in South Dowling Street, Paddington. Purchased from the Jewish community, the cathedral was built in 1927, opened for worship later that year and consecrated in 1928.

The Cathedral was purpose-built and named after the Byzantine Saint Sophia or Holy Wisdom Church in Istanbul. The Greek Orthodox Community NSW, established in 1898, presided at the consecration of Saint Sophia Cathedral in 1928.

The great schism of Greek Orthodoxy in NSW continued for many years despite significant efforts to reconcile the opposing factions. After a prolonged period of co-existence, however, the two churches were finally reconciled into the one Community, the Greek Orthodox Community of Sydney and NSW, in April 1945.

In 2015 an application was made to list the Cathedral as a heritage building by the NSW Government and this was approved. On 19 June 2016, the day of the commemoration of Saint Sophia, the NSW State Minister of Heritage, the Honourable Mark Speakman presented the Heritage Award to Harry Danalis, President of the Greek Orthodox Community NSW.

In 2008 The City of Sydney and Woollahra Councils officially named the crossroads of Oxford Street, South Dowling Street, and Darlinghurst Road, Three Saints Square recognising the Saint Sophia Cathedral, Saint Vincent's Hospital and University of Notre Dame Australia.

== Description ==
=== Siting ===
Located on the prominent Paddington corner of South Dowling and Napier Streets, the Greek Orthodox Cathedral of Saint Sophia (Agia Sophia) incorporates two buildings: the 1927 cathedral (fronting South Dowling Street) and the c. 1930 hall (behind the cathedral, fronting Napier Street).

=== Cathedral exterior ===
Constructed in the Inter-war Academic Classical architectural style, the landmark cathedral building has a symmetrically composed facade behind four fluted Ionic columns. The pediment over the entrance to the cathedral contains the inscription "Greek Orthodox Cathedral of Saint Sophia".

The exterior of the hall building also reflects the same Inter-war Academic Classical style as the cathedral. The rendered brick building demonstrates a similar classical facade with fluted pilasters. The parapet above the entry to the hall is inscribed with "Saint Sophia Hall".

=== Interior ===
Internally, the Greek Orthodox Cathedral of Saint Sophia contains dominant design elements influenced by the Byzantine architectural style. Not evident from its external elevations, the cathedral incorporates a centralised domed cupola above the nave, under which hangs the main chandelier. The cupola symbolises the sky and is aesthetically influenced by the Byzantine-style dome.

The interior of the cathedral, much like other Greek Orthodox places of worship, is richly embellished with framed icons, wall paintings depicting saints, furniture and chandeliers. Internally, the hall underwent substantial changes in the 1970s which resulted in the installation of the mezzanine, the upper level windows and the office spaces.

=== Condition ===
As at 6 January 2006, the cathedral and hall buildings are in very good condition and the ongoing maintenance is most likely a result of its continuous use since 1927.

The cathedral retains a substantial proportion of its original fabric.

The hall building underwent significant changes to its internal spaces during the 1970s with the installation of its mezzanine floor and office fit out. At the same point in time, the fenestration of the external facade was rearranged and the upper level windows installed.

=== Modifications and dates ===
Internally, the hall underwent substantial changes in the 1970s which resulted in the installation of the mezzanine, the upper level windows and the office spaces.

== Heritage listing ==
As at 7 August 2015, the Greek Orthodox Cathedral of Saint Sophia (Agia Sophia) is of state heritage significance as the first Greek Orthodox cathedral built in NSW, Australia and the southern hemisphere. The first place of worship built as a result of the great social and political schism within the Greek-Australian Orthodox community of 1924, the Greek Orthodox Cathedral of Saint Sophia (Agia Sophia) became the second dedicated centre for worship for the Greek Orthodox community in NSW.

Since its construction in 1927, the cathedral has played an important role in the settlement of immigrant communities in Sydney, becoming a focal point for the social, cultural, education and philanthropic life in the community, and today the Greek Orthodox Cathedral of Saint Sophia (Agia Sophia) continues its original purpose as a spiritual centre for Christian Orthodox worship in NSW.

Richly embellished with iconography and incorporating the centralised domed cupola above the nave (demonstrating the sky), the Greek Orthodox Cathedral of Saint Sophia (Agia Sophia) is largely influenced by the architectural legacy of the Byzantine style and is a representative example of the architectural style used for Orthodox places of worship across the world.

Greek Orthodox Cathedral of Saint Sophia was listed on the New South Wales State Heritage Register on 18 March 2016 having satisfied the following criteria.

The place is important in demonstrating the course, or pattern, of cultural or natural history in New South Wales.

The Greek Orthodox Cathedral of Saint Sophia (Agia Sophia) is of state heritage significance as the first Greek Orthodox cathedral built in NSW, Australia and the southern hemisphere. The first place of worship built as a result of the great social and political schism within the Greek-Australian Orthodox community of 1924, the Greek Orthodox Cathedral of Saint Sophia (Agia Sophia) became the second dedicated centre for worship for the Greek Orthodox community in NSW.

Since its construction in 1927, the cathedral has played an important role in the settlement of immigrant communities in Sydney and today the Greek Orthodox Cathedral of Saint Sophia (Agia Sophia) continues its original purpose as a spiritual centre for Christian Orthodox worship in NSW.

The place has a strong or special association with a person, or group of persons, of the importance of cultural or natural history of New South Wales's history.

The Greek Orthodox Cathedral of Saint Sophia (Agia Sophia) is of state significance for its association with the Greek migrants who arrived in Australia following World War I and for the significant Greek-Australian community that continues to worship at the cathedral. Religious institutions have long been a significant aspect of the Greek-Australian experience and churches have provided a stable and reliable meeting place where communities can practice and maintain their spirituality, traditional culture, values and language.

The place is important in demonstrating aesthetic characteristics and/or a high degree of creative or technical achievement in New South Wales.

A landmark set of Inter-war Academic Classical buildings straddling the prominent corner of South Dowling and Napier Streets in Paddington, the architectural style of the Greek Orthodox Cathedral of Saint Sophia (Agia Sophia) and the Saint Sophia Hall is influenced by the architectural legacy of the Byzantine style. Not evident from its external elevations, the cathedral incorporates a centralised domed cupola above the nave, under which hangs the main chandelier. The cupola symbolises the sky and is aesthetically influenced by the Byzantine-style dome.

The interior of the cathedral, much like other Greek Orthodox places of worship, is richly embellished with framed icons, wall paintings, furniture and chandeliers. The cathedral also includes a detailed iconostasis separating the nave and sanctuary.

The place has a strong or special association with a particular community or cultural group in New South Wales for social, cultural or spiritual reasons.

The Greek Orthodox Cathedral of Saint Sophia (Agia Sophia) is of state heritage significance for the important role it continues to have in the lives of the Greek Orthodox community in NSW.

Churches have been a significant aspect of the Greek-Australian experience since the first immigrants settled in Australia in the mid-to-late 19th century. With a significant influx of Greek immigrants settling in NSW following World War I, the Greek Orthodox Cathedral of Saint Sophia (Agia Sophia) became a focal point for the social, cultural, education and philanthropic life in the community. The cathedral was an important place where the Greek community could meet, maintain their Christian Orthodox faith and continue the customs, traditions and language of their homeland.

Today the Greek Orthodox Cathedral of Saint Sophia (Agia Sophia) continues its original purpose as a spiritual centre for Christian Orthodox worship in NSW and a social hub for the Greek-Australian community.

The place has potential to yield information that will contribute to an understanding of the cultural or natural history of New South Wales.

The internal space of the Greek Orthodox Cathedral of Saint Sophia (Agia Sophia) is highly embellished with iconography and ecclesiastical furniture that could provide further insight into the Christian Orthodox practice. It is considered that the potential for new information would be limited to the general practice of worship more so than revealing previously unknown information about the heritage value of the cathedral building.

There is also potential for archaeological exploration of this site to reveal evidence of the earlier recorded uses of the site (boarding house, synagogue).

The place possesses uncommon, rare or endangered aspects of the cultural or natural history of New South Wales.

The Greek Orthodox Cathedral of Saint Sophia (Agia Sophia) is not considered to be a rare example of its type as there are a number of Greek Orthodox churches throughout Sydney and NSW.

The place is important in demonstrating the principal characteristics of a class of cultural or natural places/environments in New South Wales.

The Greek Orthodox Cathedral of Saint Sophia (Agia Sophia) is of state significance as a representative example of the Christian Orthodox churches that were built to service the needs of the community of NSW.

The architectural style of the cathedral is representative of the layout of Orthodox centres of worship throughout the world. Incorporating the centralised domed cupola above the nave (to demonstrate the sky), the cathedral reflects the influence of the architectural legacy of the Byzantine style.

The interior of the cathedral, much like other Greek Orthodox places of worship, also contains rich iconographic depictions on its walls and a detailed iconostasis separating the nave and sanctuary.

== See also ==
- Greek Orthodox Archdiocese of Australia
- Greek Orthodox Churches in NSW
- List of Greek Orthodox churches in New South Wales
- List of churches dedicated to Holy Wisdom
