= Metropolis of Rhodes =

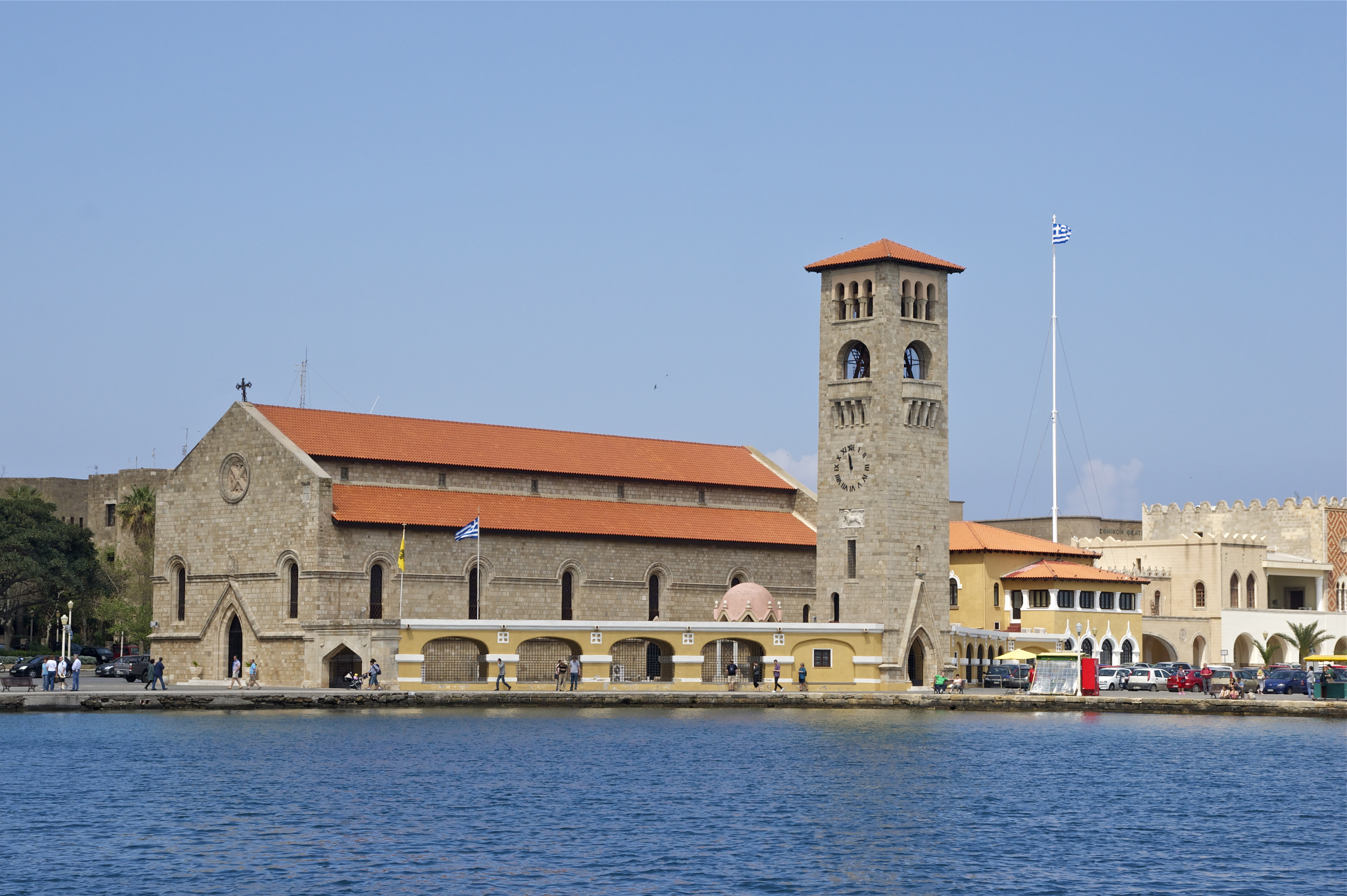
The metropolitan cathedral of the Annunciation, built by the Italians in the 1920s as a Catholic church

The Metropolis of Rhodes (Greek: Ιερά Μητρόπολις Ρόδου) is the Greek Orthodox metropolitan see covering the island of Rhodes in the Dodecanese island group in Greece. It belongs to the ecclesiastical jurisdiction of the Ecumenical Patriarchate of Constantinople.

== History ==
The foundation of the Christian community of Rhodes is traditionally attributed to the Apostle Paul, as the island is mentioned (Acts 21) during the latter's third missionary journey. Paul's companion Silas is also held to have preached and performed miracles on the island.

The exact date of the establishment of an episcopal see in Rhodes is unknown, although tradition mentions Prochorus as the first bishop in the 1st century AD. Euphranor is attested as a bishop during the 2nd century, while bishop Photinus is mentioned in the late 3rd century. During the First Ecumenical Council in 325, Rhodes was represented by bishop Euphrosynus. In Late Antiquity, Rhodes became the capital of the Roman province of the Islands, encompassing most of the Aegean Islands. Consequently, it was raised to a metropolitan see, probably some time in the late 4th or early 5th century, with a number of suffragan sees in the other islands of the province.

In the earliest of the Notitiae Episcopatuum dating to the early 5th century, Rhodes ranked 26th among the sees under the Patriarchate of Constantinople, falling to 28th place after the Fourth Ecumenical Council in 451, to 33rd in the mid-6th century, and rising to 30th in the early 9th century. In Late Antiquity and until the early 9th century, the metropolis of Rhodes counted 11 suffragan sees. In the mid-9th century, the foundation of two new sees, in Nisyros and Astypalaia, raised the number of suffragans to 13, but in the early 10th century the number briefly fell to 10, after the two new sees were disbanded and Andros came under the Metropolitan of Athens. Soon, however, the two sees were re-established, and the see of Ikaria added, bringing the number back to 13, and, after the 970s, to 14, with the addition of the bishopric of Tracheia. Eventually, the metropolis counted 15 suffragan sees, with the addition of the bishops of Linos and Apameia. The metropolis held the 38th rank from the 10th to the early 12th century, before falling to the 45th from the late 13th until the early 14th century.

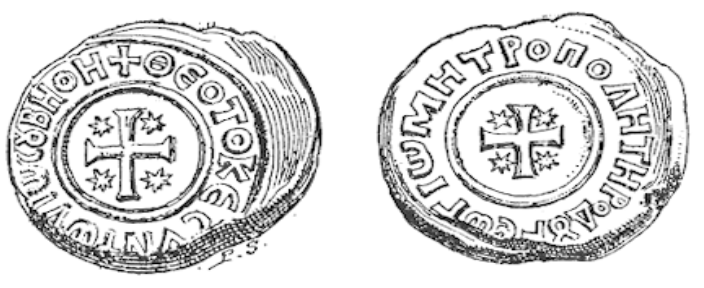
Seal of George, Metropolitan of Rhodes (13th century)

From 1308/9, the island fell under the rule of the Knights Hospitaller. The Knights evicted the Orthodox metropolitan, and installed a Latin Archbishop in his stead. The Patriarchate of Constantinople continued to appoint metropolitans in exile, but after 1369 the see of Rhodes was awarded to the metropolitan of Side on the coast of Asia Minor, and was later assumed by Stauropolis in 1387 and 1393. The Orthodox community on the island was administered by a council comprising local priests and secular potentates. In the early 15th century, the rising power of the Ottomans forced the Knights to adopt a more conciliatory stance, and the Orthodox metropolitans were allowed back on the island. The Union of the Churches in the Council of Florence (1447) met with ardent opposition by the Orthodox populace of the island, forcing the Knights to violently suppress their reactions.

Rhodes finally fell to the Ottomans in 1522, allowing for the full restoration of the Orthodox Church on the island. Ottoman rule was characterized by relative calm, despite occasional disputes. Having lost all its suffragan sees by the early 14th century, by the early 17th century, the metropolis had risen back to 38th place among the metropolises under Constantinople, with a single suffragan, the see of Lerni, until it was raised to a separate metropolis in 1888. During the Greek War of Independence (1821–29), the Orthodox Church on the island suffered persecution, and its privileges were suspended until 1835, when a new firman restored them.

In 1912, during the Italo-Turkish War, Rhodes along with the rest of the Dodecanese was occupied by Italy. Although at first welcomed as liberators, and promising autonomy for the islands or even a union with Greece, the Italians soon began to implement a policy of Italianization in their new colony. As the main native institution on the islands, the Orthodox Church was a major target of this campaign, such as the gradual revocation of its Ottoman-era privileges, attempts to split it from the Patriarchate and make the Dodecanese Church autocephalous, and persecution of the leading clergy. The period of Italian rule came finally to an end with the German occupation of the islands in 1943, leading after the war to the union of the Dodecanese with Greece (1947). The metropolitan of Rhodes, Apostolos Tryphonos, played a leading role in maintaining the islands' Greek identity throughout the period.

In April 2004, the islands of Symi, Chalki, Tilos and Kastellorizo were split off to form the new Metropolis of Symi, while the island of Nisyros came under the Metropolis of Kos.

Currently, the Metropolis of Rhodes comprises 17 parishes in the municipal unit of Rhodes City, 2 in the municipal unit of Ialysos, 6 in the municipal unit of Petaloudes, 8 in the municipal unit of Kameiros, 6 in the municipal unit of Attavyros, 10 in the municipal unit of South Rhodes, 5 in the municipal unit of Lindos, 3 in the municipal unit of Archangelos, 2 in the municipal unit of Afantou, and 4 in the municipal unit of Kallithea. The current metropolitan bishop is, since 20 April 2004, Cyril (born Konstantinos Kogerakis).

== Episcopal list ==
This is a list of the known bishops who have occupied the see of Rhodes (Roman Catholic archbishops under Hospitaller rule not included):

Name	Name in Greek	Tenure	Notes
Prochorus		1st century	
Photinus		284–305	
Euphrosynus		305–325?	
Hellanodikos		431–?	
John I		449–454	
Agapetus		455–459	
Essaias		513–528	
Theodosius I		553–?	
Isidore		680–681	
Leo I		783–801	
Theophanes		814–832	
Nilus I		833–?	
Michael		858	
Leontius		858–868	
Michael		868–879	2nd time
Leontius		879–?	2nd time
Theodore		997–?	
John II		1070–1100	
Nicephorus		1147–1156	
[Anonymous]		1156–1166	
John III		1166	
Leo II		1166–?	
George		1256	
Theodoulos		1256–1274	
[Anonymous]		1274–?	
John IV		1350–1355	
Nilus II Diassorianos		1355–1369	
[Anonymous]		1393–?	
Andrew of Chios		1432–1437	
Nathanael		1437–1439	
Makarios		1450–1455	
Nilus III		1455–1470	
Metrophanes I		1471–1498	
Metrophanes II		1498–1511	
Jeremias I		1511–1522	
Clemens		1522–1523	
Euphemios		1524–1525?	
Theodosius II		1541–1548	
Kallistos		1576–1594	
Nikandros		1581	
Paisios I		1595–1603	
Jeremias II		1603–1604	
Philotheos II		1604–1610	
Ignatius I		1610–1612	
Pachomios		1612–1637	
Meletios I		1637–1639	
Paisios II		1639–1643	
Meletios II		1643–1651	
Gregory I		1651–1652	
Nathanael II		1652–1656	
Joachim I		1656–1676	
Parthenios		1676–1691	
Constantius of Mytilene		1692–1702	
Ignatius II		1702–1722	
Neophytus of Chios		1722–1733	
Jeremias III of Patmos		1733–1758	
Kallinikos I of Veroia		1758–1792	
Agapios of Thera		1792–1811	
Zacharias of Veroia		1811–1823	
Agapios of Thera		1823–1829	2nd time
Paisios III of Andros		1829–1831	
Methodios of Crete		1831–1832	
Paisios IV		1833–1836	
Kallinikos II of Crete		1836–1839	
Jacob of Patmos		1839–1856	
Ignatius III of Adrianople		1856–1861	
Cyril I Papadakis of Crete		1861	
Dorotheos Prasinos of Constantinople		1862–1865	
Synesios		1865–1876	
Germanos		1876–1888	Subsequently Patriarch of Constantinople, 1913–1918
Gregory II of Lesbos		1888–1893	
Constantine I Alexandritis of Adrianople		1893–1900	
Hierotheos Dimitriadis of Nisyros		1900	
Joachim II Valasiadis of Antigoni		1900–1910	
Benjamin Kyriakou		1912–1913	Subsequently Patriarch of Constantinople, 1936–1946
Apostolos I Tryphonos of Krithia		1913–1946	
Timotheos Evangelinidis of Mytilene		1947–1949	
Spyridon Synodinos of Cephalonia		1951–1988	
Apostolos II Dimelis of Archangelos		1988–2004	
Cyril II Kogerakis of Crete		since 2004	

== Bibliography ==
- Kiminas, Demetrius (2009). The Ecumenical Patriarchate: A History of Its Metropolitanates with Annotated Hierarch Catalogs. Wildside Press LLC. ISBN 9781434458766.
