= Cathedral of the Annunciation of Our Lady =

- Cathedral of the Annunciation of Our Lady Theotoko
- Greek Orthodox Cathedral
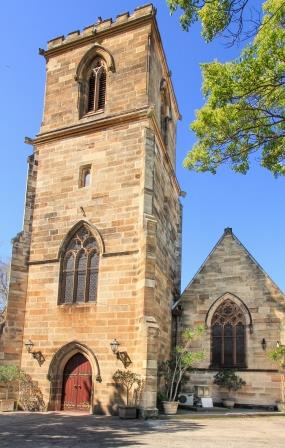
- Cathedral of the Annunciation of Our Lady, pictured in 2015.
- Cathedral of the Annunciation of Our Lady
- 33°53′20″S 151°12′09″E
- Location: 242 Cleveland Street, Redfern, New South Wales
- Country: Australia
- Denomination: Greek Orthodox
- Previous denomination: Anglicanism
- Website: goacathedral.org.au

History
- Former names: St Paul's Anglican Church; St Paul's Church of England
- Status: Anglican Church (1848–1967); Orthodox Cathedral (since 1967)
- Founded: January 1848 (as St Paul's)
- Dedication: Annunciation of Mary, mother of Jesus
- Dedicated: 1970
- Earlier dedication: August 1855 as Saint Paul (Anglican church)

Architecture
- Functional status: Active
- Architects: Edmund Blacket (church); John Burcham Clamp (rectory)
- Architectural type: Church
- Style: Decorated Gothic
- Years built: 1848–
- Closed: c. 1967 (as an Anglican church)

Administration
- Archdiocese: Australia

Clergy
- Priest: Christophoros Krikelis

New South Wales Heritage Register
- Official name: Cathedral of the Annunciation of Our Lady; Greek Orthodox Cathedral; St Paul's Anglican Church; St Paul's Church of England; Cathedral of the 'Annunciation of Our Lady Theotokos'
- Type: State heritage (built)
- Designated: 17 April 2012
- Reference no.: 1881
- Type: Churchyard
- Category: Religion

The Cathedral of the Annunciation of Our Lady is a heritage-listed former Anglican church and now Greek Orthodox cathedral located at 242 Cleveland Street, Redfern, New South Wales, Australia. The church was designed by Edmund Blacket and the rectory was designed by John Burcham Clamp and built from 1848. It is also known as the Greek Orthodox Cathedral; St Paul's Anglican Church; St Paul's Church of England; Cathedral of the Annunciation of Our Lady Theotokos. The property is owned by Greek Orthodox Archdiocese of Australia. It was added to the New South Wales State Heritage Register on 17 April 2012.

== History ==
=== Anglican church ===
As the Sydney township expanded after the first phases of colonial settlement, the suburbs of Redfern and Chippendale were soon subdivided to accommodate the developing industry and population. To service these new communities, land was quickly selected and dedicated for the construction of essential government facilities - namely a church and school. By 1846, the prominent corner location had been selected for the construction of an Anglican church and, in 1847, Bishop William Broughton - Australia's first (and only) bishop - had awarded the commission of the construction to Edmund Blacket, the diocesan architect for the Church of England in Australia.

Blacket had a particular interest in the gothic style of architecture and designed St Paul's Church in the Decorated Gothic form. During the colonial period, architecture was commissioned by the British settlers and was often designed to reflect the buildings of their homelands. The ecclesiastical building models were symbolic of Christianity and Blacket, in keeping with other colonial architects of the time, took inspiration from the design of established churches in England. The elevations and dimensions for St Paul's Church were taken from a lithograph of St Barnabas' at Homerton in East London - designed by Arthur Ashpitel.

Following the laying of the foundation stone on St Paul's Day in January 1848, construction of St Paul's Church soon followed but work proceeded slowly due to the economic depression in the colony and the high demand for skilled labour. Built in stages, the church was - in the most part - complete by its consecration in August 1855 but almost immediately underwent further expansion to accommodate the greater population numbers now residing in the Redfern and Chippendale areas. By 1858, the southern aisle of the church was complete and, by 1875, the tower was finished.

During the second half of the nineteenth century, Redfern and Chippendale continued to be mixed suburbs of both residential and industry and it was not long before living conditions began to decline and these inner-city areas turned into slums. Efforts to improve these conditions were largely spurred by Reverend Francis Bertie Boyce who was appointed to the parish of St Paul's in 1884 (and who remained as an active and vocal leader for social reform until his retirement in 1930). A champion for clearing slums, improving living conditions, promoting pensions and alleviating working class distress, Boyce became a notable and innovative public figure in campaigning for the social improvement of his parish.

During World War II, when it was St Paul's Church, they operated a hostel for service personnel on leave in Sydney. They had 50 beds, 20 volunteers and were open on Friday and Saturday nights. The cost was 1/- and came with morning tea. By February 1944 they had slept 1,500 men in previous 12 months. They did this in partnership with the Church of England National Emergency Fund.

By the outbreak of the World War II, the population decline of Redfern and Chippendale was acute with its residents leaving for the new and expanding outer suburbs of Sydney. The ethnic composition of the inner-city was in a state of change and, into the newly vacated terraces, came the European migrants who had fled war-torn Europe. A new residential demographic saw a shift in the social demand for religion and the decline of the Anglican congregation and the rise of the Orthodox migrant settlers led to the sale of the church in 1967.

=== Greek Orthodoxy in Sydney ===
Orthodoxy been present in NSW since the nineteenth century and has been practised at a number of churches around Sydney before the establishment of the cathedral in Redfern. The Holy Trinity Greek Orthodox Church in Surry Hills, built in 1898, was the first of its kind in the Southern Hemisphere and practised under the spiritual jurisdiction of the Church of Greece, an autocephalous branch of the Ecumenical Patriarchate of Constantinople. Following contentious disputes amongst the leadership about the direction of the church, the congregation split and the Cathedral of Agia Sophia (Holy Wisdom of God) was established in Paddington in 1927.

After many years of tension between the churches and their prolonged period of co-existence, the two churches were finally reconciled in 1945 - a critical point in history when Australia was experiencing a steep increase in the numbers of Greek Orthodox migrants fleeing the war in Europe. The establishment of churches has always been a key element in the maintenance of faith and the provision of social support services to settling communities. With the migrant community growing steadily because of the government-assisted settlement after the war, the cathedral for Greek Orthodoxy was formed to become the focal point of cultural, education and philanthropic life in the community. Essential for the ongoing practice and celebration of their customs, traditions and language, the cathedral was an important support structure for the new communities settling and integrating into the Australian community.

With the congregation swelling and the Cathedral of St Sophia's reaching its capacity, the proposal to purchase St Paul's Church in Redfern afforded the Greek Orthodox Archdiocese an opportunity to encapsulate a cathedral and the necessary institutional facilities all on the one site. By 1970, the church had been converted and re-consecrated as the Greek Orthodox cathedral. Holy Wisdom Cathedral has since become known as the “old mitropolis” church.

Today, the cathedral is internationally recognised as the seat of Greek Orthodoxy in Australia. It is home to the Greek Orthodox Archbishop and provides service for the most significant events within the church.

== Description ==
Positioned on a visually prominent site, the cathedral was built in the Colonial Decorated Gothic style. A sandstone construction with slate covered timber roof, the building also consists of a square tower surmounted by an octagonal turret, with a nave, two wide aisles, chancel, two vestries and two porches.

It has been noted that the landmark design of this building is reflected in its positioning and the alignment between the parapet and that of St Paul's College at the University of Sydney (also an Edmund Blacket design).

The architectural form, elevation and dimensions of the cathedral were taken from a lithograph of St Barnabas' at Homerton - designed by Arthur Ashpitel. Using English architectural patterns for inspiration was a common practice for colonial architects in Australia.

The cathedral is supplemented by a number of later buildings on the site. The former rectory (1912) was enlarged after the site's conversion to Orthodoxy to include a second storey and is now used as office and meeting space for the Archdiocese. Later buildings on the site (from the 1980s and 1990s) include the library, stores, Archbishop's residence and St Andrew's Greek Orthodox Theological College.

=== Condition ===
As at 14 November 2011, the church was in very good condition and its ongoing maintenance is most likely a result of its continuous use since 1855.

Despite some internal modifications to convert the former Anglican church into its current use as the Greek Orthodox Cathedral, the building is in very good condition and retains much of its integrity and intactness.

=== Modifications and dates ===
- 1911 – Government resumption of acres of church land to widen adjacent railway tunnel resulted in demolition of school (1854) and rectory (1864)
- 1912 – construction of new rectory
- 1913 – minor works to church (under direction of Blacket & Sons Architects) included addition of stone vestry, re-slating of roof and probable addition of ventilation cowels
- 1967–70 – internal alterations to conform to Greek Orthodox liturgy
- 1970 – iconostasis installed
- 1980s/90s – construction of surrounding buildings on site
- c. 1993 – rectory enlarged with second storey

== Heritage listing ==
As at 15 October 2012, the Cathedral of the Annunciation of Our Lady is of state heritage significance as an important early ecclesiastical design in the architectural career of Edmund Blacket. Originally St Paul's Anglican Church, its Decorated Gothic design became one of the established architectural models for parish church construction throughout NSW.

This item is also significant as the Greek Orthodox Cathedral for Australia and for its association with the migrant communities that settled in NSW following World War II. Establishing churches and maintaining the orthodox faith has always been a significant aspect of the Greek-Australian experience and, since the conversion and re-consecration of the church to the Orthodox faith in 1970, the cathedral has become a centre for worship and the continuity and celebration of Greek customs, traditions and language.

The former Anglican church also has a significant association with Reverend Francis Bertie Boyce, who resided over the parish from 1886 until his retirement in 1930. A notable and active leader for social reform, Boyce used his political connections to campaign for clearing slums, improving living conditions, promoting pensions and alleviating working class distress within the Redfern/Chippendale parish.

Cathedral of the Annunciation of Our Lady was listed on the New South Wales State Heritage Register on 17 April 2012 having satisfied the following criteria.

The place is important in demonstrating the course, or pattern, of cultural or natural history in New South Wales.

The Cathedral of the Annunciation of Our Lady is of state heritage significance as an important ecclesiastical design in the architectural career of Edmund Blacket. Blacket was the diocesan architect for the Church of England and was awarded three important commissions in the late 1840s – these being St Paul's in Redfern, Church of the Holy Trinity in Berrima and St Phillips in Church Hill. Blacket designed different Gothic forms for each of these churches and, in doing so, established the architectural model for parish church construction throughout NSW.

This item is also significant as the Greek Orthodox Cathedral for Australia. Since its conversion and re-consecration to the Orthodox faith in 1970, the cathedral has become a cultural centre for worship, education and the continuity of Greek customs, traditions and language in Australia.

The place has a strong or special association with a person, or group of persons, of importance of cultural or natural history of New South Wales's history.

The Cathedral of the Annunciation of Our Lady has state heritage significance for its association with the migrant communities that settled in Australia following World War II. Establishing churches and maintaining the orthodox faith has always been a significant aspect of the Greek-Australian experience and with the settlement of a new population after the war, the formation of a cathedral for Greek Orthodoxy was of fundamental importance. The cathedral became the focal point of cultural, education and philanthropic life in the community and was essential for the ongoing practice and celebration of their customs, traditions and language.

The building also has a significant association with the acclaimed colonial architect Edmund Blacket. Blacket was the diocesan architect for the Church of England and was awarded three important commissions in the late 1840s - these being St Paul's in Redfern, Church of the Holy Trinity in Berrima and St Phillips in Church Hill. Blacket designed different Gothic forms for each of these churches and, in doing so, established the architectural model for parish church construction throughout NSW.

The former Anglican church also has a significant association with Reverend Francis Bertie Boyce, who resided over the parish from 1886 until his retirement in 1930. A notable and active leader for social reform, Boyce used his political connections to campaign for clearing slums, improving living conditions, promoting pensions and alleviating working class distress.

The place is important in demonstrating aesthetic characteristics and/or a high degree of creative or technical achievement in New South Wales.

The Cathedral of the Annunciation of Our Lady has state heritage significance as an early example of Edmund Blacket's work as Diocesan Architect for the Church of England and as a largely intact example of his ecclesiastical designs in the Colonial Decorated Gothic style. Positioned in a visually prominent location, the design of this landmark church made use of an already popular architectural style that was a potent reflection of the buildings of Britain (of home).

The place has a strong or special association with a particular community or cultural group in New South Wales for social, cultural or spiritual reasons.

The Cathedral of the Annunciation of Our Lady has state heritage significance for the important role it continues to have in the lives of the Greek Orthodox community in NSW. Following World War II and the government-assisted migration program, a significant Greek community settled in NSW and the establishment of a cathedral was important as a place to meet, maintain the orthodox faith and continue the Greek customs, traditions and language.

Churches have always been a significant aspect of the Greek-Australian experience and, with the settlement of a new population after the war, the cathedral became the focal point for the social, cultural, education and philanthropic life in the community. This social significance continues as the generations of migrant-descendants learn and celebrate their Greek identity.

Today, the cathedral is internationally recognised as the seat of Greek Orthodoxy in Australia and provides service for the most significant events within the church. As the Greek Orthodox cathedral in Australia, this site has particular significance for those follow the Greek Orthodox faith.

The place has potential to yield information that will contribute to an understanding of the cultural or natural history of New South Wales.

Expansion of the adjacent railway facilities saw the resumption of acres of church land in 1911 - leading to the demolition of the school (1854) and rectory (1864). Further archaeological exploration of this site may reveal evidence of these earlier buildings.

The place possesses uncommon, rare or endangered aspects of the cultural or natural history of New South Wales.

This building may be considered rare as the seat of Greek orthodoxy in Australia but its design (originally as an Anglican church) is not particularly rare in NSW.

The place is important in demonstrating the principal characteristics of a class of cultural or natural places/environments in New South Wales.

The Cathedral of the Annunciation of Our Lady is a representative example of Gothic-style churches designed by Edmund Blacket during his career as diocesan architect for the Church of England. During the colonial period, architecture was commissioned by the British settlers and was often designed to reflect the buildings of their homelands. The ecclesiastical building models were symbolic of Christianity and Blacket, in keeping with other colonial architects of the time, took inspiration from the design of established churches in England.

Its use as a Greek Orthodox Cathedral is also representative of religious institutions being used as a community meeting place for the continuity and practice of traditional customs and language. Churches were often used by migrant communities for this purpose.

== See also ==
- Greek Orthodox Archdiocese of Australia
- Greek Orthodox Churches in NSW
