= Autocephalous Greek Orthodox Church of America and Australia =

The Autocephalous Greek Orthodox Church of America and Australia is a Greek Orthodox denomination.

On 18 November 1926, the new Council of the Greek Community of Sydney "seceded from the Australian Orthodox Metropolis and joined the Autocephalous Greek Orthodox Church of America and Canada led by the defrocked Metropolitan Vassilios Komvopoulos. The sacraments conducted by the discharged and defrocked priests in Melbourne and Sydney were declared null and void by the Greek government and the children born from nullified marriages were not recognized by Greece."
