= Greek Orthodox Archdiocese of Australia =

- Official seal

Location
- Country: Australia
- Headquarters: Cathedral of the Annunciation of Our Lady, Redfern, Sydney

Statistics
- Population: Total: approx. 400,000 (2021 Census)
- Parishes: 121
- Schools: 8

Information
- Denomination: Eastern Orthodox Church
- Rite: Byzantine Rite
- Established: 1924
- Cathedral: Cathedral of the Annunciation of Our Lady (1970–present); Saint Sophia Cathedral, Sydney (1927–1970)
- Patron saint: Saint Paisios of Mount Athos
- Language: Greek, English (Note: Ukrainian and Arabic are also used in some parishes with Ukrainian and Lebanese communities.)
- Calendar: Revised Julian Calendar

Current leadership
- Parent church: Ecumenical Patriarchate of Constantinople
- Archbishop: Makarios (Griniezakis)
- Auxiliary Bishops: Bishop Iakovos of Miletoupolis; Bishop Christodoulos of Magnesia; Bishop Christophoros of Kerasounta

Website
- greekorthodox.org.au

The Greek Orthodox Archdiocese of Australia is the Australian archdiocese of the Greek Orthodox Church, part of the wider communion of Eastern Orthodox Christianity. The archdiocese is a jurisdiction of the Ecumenical Patriarchate of Constantinople. As of 2024, there were over 130 parishes and eight monasteries in the six dioceses of the archdiocese in Australia.

== Archbishop and governance ==
Since May 9, 2019, Archbishop Makarios is Archbishop of Australia.

Since February 2024, the Archdiocese of Australia is governed by the Holy Eparchial Synod, at which the incumbent Archbishop of the day presides, and whose members are his active assistant Bishops in their capacity as Regional Bishops.

== History ==
On 1 September 1959, the Metropolis of Australia and New Zealand was elevated to an archdiocese and Metropolitan Ezekiel to an archbishop. Archbishop Ezekiel's episcopacy coincided with a period of great expansion in the numbers of Greek Orthodox in Australia through immigration, and many of the parishes that the church has today were formed under his guidance. In August 1974, the Holy and Sacred Synod of the Ecumenical Patriarchate elevated Archbishop Ezekiel to the titular see of Metropolitan of Pisidia. He died in Athens in July 1987. On 3 February 1975, the Holy Synod of the Ecumenical Patriarchate unanimously elected the Metropolitan of Miletoupolis, Stylianos Harkianakis, a lecturer at the University of Thessaloniki, as the new Archbishop of Australia. Archbishop Stylianos arrived in Sydney on 15 April 1975 and was officially enthroned on Lazarus Saturday, 26 April 1975.

At the 12th Clergy-Laity Congress held in Sydney in September 2023, Saint Paisios of Mount Athos was declared Patron Saint of the Holy Archdiocese of Australia by Archbishop Makarios.

His All Holiness Ecumenical Patriarch Bartholomew of Constantinople has visited Australia twice, in 1996 and 2024. The 1996 visit of His All Holiness was historic as it was the first time the Patriarch of Constantinople visited Australia. On this visit, a Patriarchal Divine Liturgy occurred at the Sydney Entertainment Centre on Sunday November 24. Likewise, his visit in 2024 was also historic as coincided with the 100th anniversary of the founding of the Archdiocese of Australia. Two Patriarchal Divine Liturgies occurred in 2024, on Sunday October 6 at the International Convention Centre, Sydney and on Sunday October 14 at Margaret Court Arena, Melbourne.

== Primates ==
- Metropolitan Christoforos of Australia and New Zealand (1924-1929)
- Metropolitan Timotheos of Australia and New Zealand (1931-1947)
- Metropolitan Theophylactos of Australia and New Zealand (1947-1958)
- Metropolitan Ezekiel of Australia and New Zealand (1959), Archbishop Ezekiel of Australia and New Zealand (1959-1970), Archbishop Ezekiel of Australia (1970-1974)
- Archbishop Stylianos of Australia (1975-2019)
- Archbishop Makarios of Australia (2019–present)

== Current hierarchs ==
The following clergy are members of the archdiocese's current hierarchy.

Greek Orthodox Hierarchs in Australia
| Hierarch | Position(s) | Years | Notes |
| Archbishop Makarios of Australia | Archbishop of Australia | 2019–present | 2015-2019: Bishop of Christoupolis, serving in Estonia |
| Bishop Iakovos of Miletoupolis | Assistant Bishop | 2011–present | Based in Sydney, First Australian-born Bishop of the Ecumenical Patriarchate |
| Bishop Elpidios of Perth | Regional Bishop (Chorepiskopos) of Perth | 2020–present | 2020-2024: Bishop of Kyanea |
| Bishop Silouan of Adelaide | Regional Bishop (Chorepiskopos) of Adelaide | 2020–present | 2020-2024: Bishop of Sinope |
| Bishop Kyriakos of Melbourne | Regional Bishop (Chorepiskopos) of Melbourne | 2021–present | 2021-2024: Bishop of Sozopolis |
| Bishop Christodoulos of Magnesia | Assistant Bishop | 2021–present | Based in Sydney |
| Bishop Evmenios of Chora | Regional Bishop (Chorepiskopos) of Chora | 2021–present | 2021-2024: Bishop of Kerasounta |
| Bishop Bartholomew of Brisbane | Regional Bishop (Chorepiskopos) of Brisbane | 2021–present | 2021-2024: Bishop of Charioupolis |
| Bishop Athinagoras of Canberra | Regional Bishop (Chorepiskopos) of Canberra | 2025-present | 2019-2025: Archdeacon of Australia |
| Bishop Christophoros of Kerasounta | Assistant Bishop | 2025-present | Based in Sydney, also Australian-born |

== Archdiocesan districts and heads ==
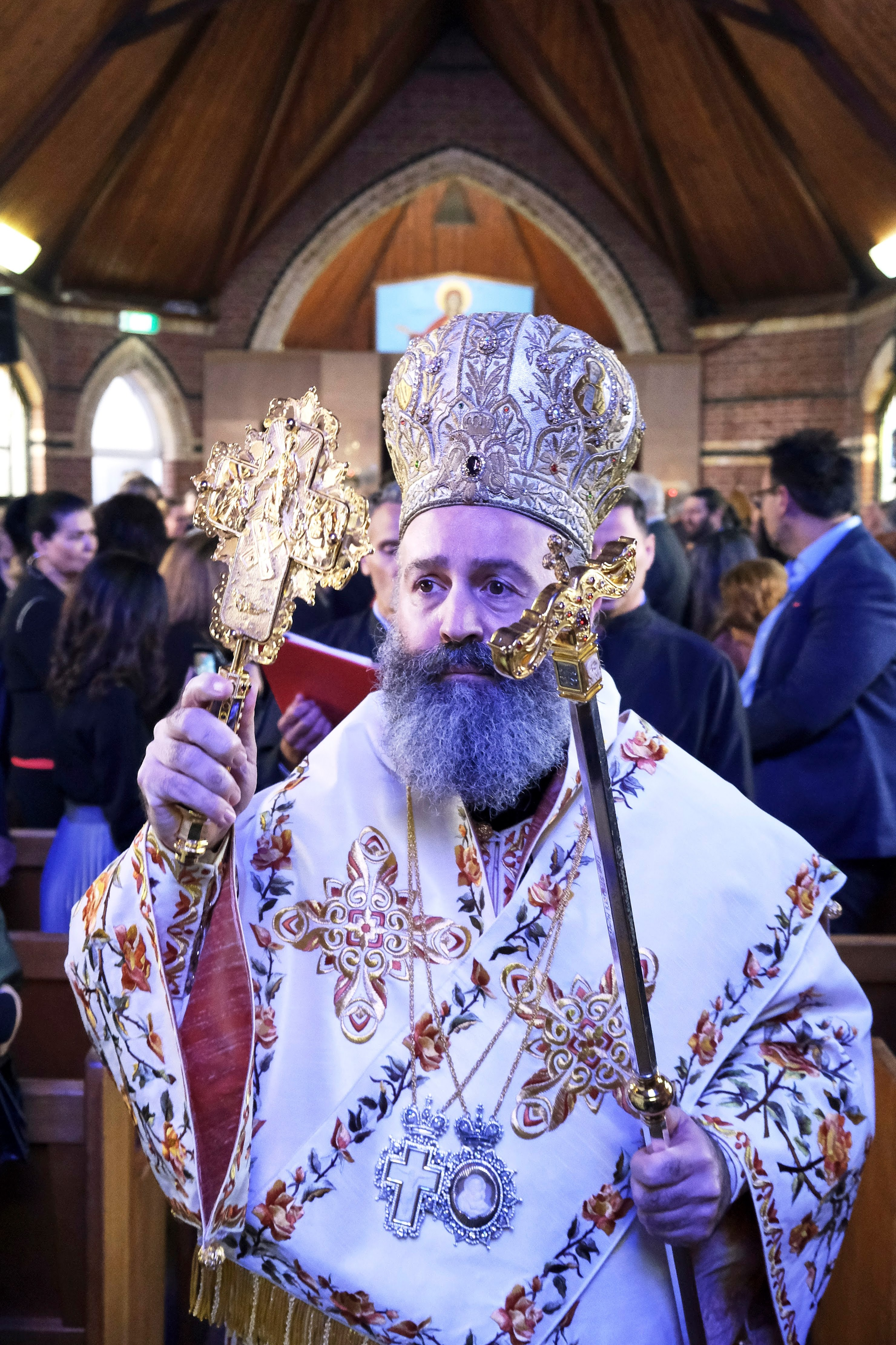
Archbishop Makarios at the opening of the Church of Holy Wisdom in the Archdiocesan District of Adelaide, November 2022.

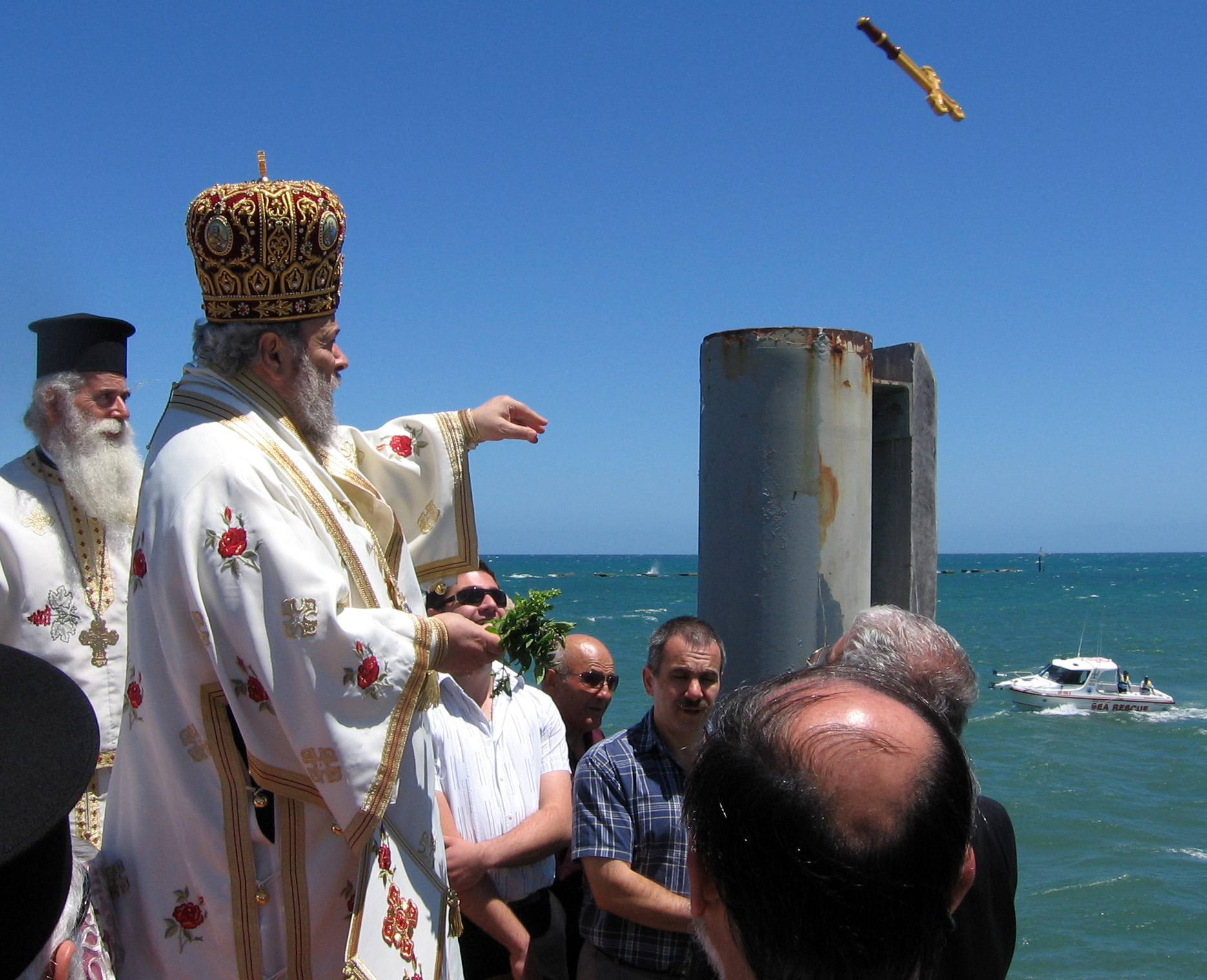
Bishop Nikandros of Dorylaion, assistant to Archbishop Stylianos from 2001 to 2019, conducting the Epiphany service in Adelaide, 2008.

=== Diocese of Perth ===
- Bishop Elpidios, Regional Bishop (Chorepiskopos) of Perth

=== Diocese of Adelaide ===
- Bishop Silouan, Regional Bishop (Chorepiskopos) of Adelaide

=== Diocese of Melbourne ===
- Bishop Kyriakos, Regional Bishop (Chorepiskopos) of Melbourne

=== Diocese of Chora ===
- Bishop Evmenios, Regional Bishop (Chorepiskopos) of Chora

=== Diocese of Brisbane ===
- Bishop Bartholomew, Regional Bishop (Chorepiskopos) of Brisbane

=== Diocese of Canberra ===
- Bishop-elect Athenagoras, Regional Bishop (Chorepiskopos) of Canberra

== Former hierarchs in Australia ==
| Hierarch | Years | Position(s) | Notes |
|---|---|---|---|
| Bishop Dionysios of Nazianzus | 1959 – 1970 | unknown (1959-1965).; Assistant Bishop in Melbourne (1965-1970). | Metropolitan of New Zealand (1970–2003); Retired in 2003 receiving the title Metropolitan of Pisidia.; Died January 6, 2008. |
| Bishop Chrysostomos of Myrinae | 1960 – 1963 | unknown | Retired to America in 1963.; Died January 10, 1988. |
| Bishop Aristarchos of Zinoupolis | 1972 – 1981 | Assistant Bishop in Melbourne (1972).; Assistant Bishop in Adelaide (1973-1975).; Assistant Bishop in Melbourne (1976-1981). | Moved to the Archdiocese of Thyateira and Great Britain.; Died August 9, 2002. |
| Bishop Panteleimon of Theoupoleos | 1971 – 1984 | Assistant Bishop in Sydney (1971-1972).; Assistant Bishop in Melbourne (1972-1975).; Assistant Bishop in Adelaide (1975-1979).; Assistant Bishop in Melbourne (1979-1984). | Retired to Thessaloniki in 1984.; Received the title Metropolitan of Vryoula in 2018. |
| Bishop Ezekiel of Dervis | 1977 – 2021 | Assistant Bishop in Perth (1977-1980).; Assistant Bishop in Adelaide (1980-1984).; Assistant Bishop in Melbourne (1984-2021). | Retired in 2021, receiving the title Metropolitan of Dervis.; Based in Melbourne. |
| Bishop Paul of Christianoupolis | 1984 – 1989 | Assistant Bishop in Adelaide | Retired in 1989.; Based in Adelaide.; Died September 17, 2024. |
| Bishop Joseph of Arianzos | 1989 – 2003 | Assistant Bishop in Adelaide (1989-2001).; Second Bishop in Melbourne (2001-2003). | Metropolitan of New Zealand (2003–2005).; Retired to Piraeus in 2005.; Received the title Metropolitan of Proikonnisos in 2008. |
| Bishop Seraphim of Apollonias | 1991 – 2019 | Chancellor of the Archdiocese and Assistant Bishop in Sydney. | Retired in 2019 receiving the title Metropolitan of Sevasteia.; Based in Sydney. |
| Bishop Seraphim of Christianoupolis | 2001 – 2002 | Assistant Bishop in Adelaide. | Resigned from the Archdiocese in 2002.; Elected Metropolitan of Piraeus in 2006. |
| Bishop Nikandros of Dorylaion | 2002 – 2019 | Assistant Bishop in Adelaide. | Retired in 2019 receiving the title Metropolitan of Eirinoupolis.; Based in Greece |
| Bishop Emilianos of Meloa | 2019 – 2024 | Chancellor of the Archdiocese and Assistant Bishop in Sydney (2019-2021); Assistant Bishop in Brisbane (2021-2024). | Resigned from the Archdiocese in 2024. |

== Monasteries and seminaries ==
The Axion Estin Greek Monastery, also called CHORA, was the first Greek Orthodox monastery established outside Greece. In 2001, the site of the former Little Sisters of the Poor Home for the Aged in Northcote, Melbourne, was acquired, with the aim of transforming the facility into a cultural and community precinct for the Greek community, with spaces for education, recreation, creativity, heritage, and communal activities.

The St Andrew's Greek Orthodox Theological College is an Eastern Orthodox Christian seminary located in Redfern, Sydney, New South Wales, established in 1986 by Archbishop Stylianos.

== See also ==
- Archbishop of America
- Greek Australian
- Greek Orthodox Churches in NSW
- Greek Orthodox Churches in South Australia and the Northern Territory
- Assembly of Canonical Orthodox Bishops of Australia, New Zealand, and Oceania

== Bibliography ==
- Kiminas, Demetrius (2009). The Ecumenical Patriarchate: A History of Its Metropolitanates with Annotated Hierarch Catalogs. Wildside Press LLC. ISBN 9781434458766.
