= Metropolitan Theophylactos of Australia =

Greek Orthodox bishop

Metropolitan Theophylactos (born Vasileios Papathanasopoulos; 1891–1958) was a Greek Orthodox Metropolitan Bishop in the Greek Orthodox Archdiocese of Australia.

== Biography ==
Papathanasopoulos was born on the feast of St. Basil on 1 January 1891 and was baptised Vasileios (Basil). He was born and raised at Pyrgos, Greece, son of Demetrios Papathanasopoulos and his wife Kaliopi. He studied theology at the Theological School of Halki and began his novitiate at the monastery of Stavronikita, Mount Athos, Greece. He made his vows as a monk on 2 December 1917 and took the name Theophylactos and then was ordained priest. After graduating from the theological faculty of University of Athens, he taught at the Rizareios Ecclesiastical School.

In February 1928, following the dismissal of Metropolitan Christoforos Knitis, Father Papathanasopoulos was sent to Sydney as administrator until a new bishop arrived. He served as a parish priest for five years in Sydney and for fourteen in Melbourne until he was appointed the third Metropolitan of Australia and New Zealand on 22 April 1947. He was consecrated in Greece on 24 August and spent some time at the monastery of Stavronikita, Mount Athos. He proceeded to his new post, reaching Perth on 19 April 1948. He was enthroned in Sydney on 13 June, in the presence of a congregation that included Greek, Russian and Syrian clergy.

His reign was cut short when he died on 2 August 1958 in the Alfred Hospital, Melbourne, from injuries received in a car accident two days earlier.

His funeral service was presided over by Archbishop Athenagoras of Thyateira at the Cathedral of St Sophia, Darlinghurst, Sydney. He was buried at Botany Cemetery, and to date he is the only Greek Orthodox bishop to be buried in Australasia. He now rests in the Orthodox section of Rookwood Cemetery in an area for clergy, just behind the sanctuary of Saint Athanasius Chapel.

In February 1959, Ezekiel Tsoukalas of Nazianzos was elected the fourth Metropolitan of Australia and New Zealand.

Eastern Orthodox Church titles
| Preceded by Metropolitan Timotheos | Metropolitan of Australia and New Zealand; 1947-1958 | Succeeded by Metropolitan Ezekiel |
