= Metropolitan Christoforos of Australia =

Greek Orthodox bishop (1872–1958)

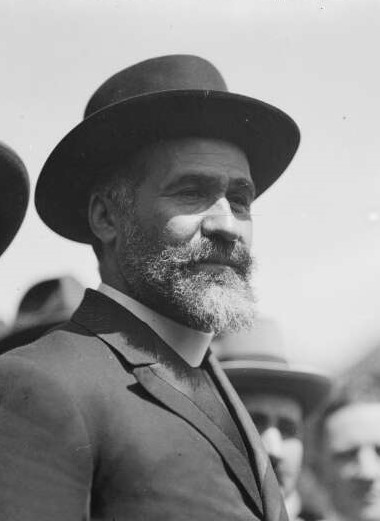
Metropolitan Christoforos around 1924

Christoforos Knitis (Greek: Χριστόφορος Κνιτής; 17 December 1872, in Samos, Greece – 7 August 1959, in Samos, Greece) was a Greek priest and Greek Orthodox bishop in the Metropolis of Australia and New Zealand from 1924 to 1928.

== Overview ==
Knitis was born on 17 December 1872 and baptised Charidemos. He was born and raised in Vathi, on the island of Samos, and was the son of Charidemos Knitis and his wife Fioritsa. He studied at the University of Athens, and studied theology at the Theological School of Halki.

He was made deacon in on 19 July 1898 and took the name Christoforos. He became a teacher at his old high school, Pythagoreion Gymnasion, on Samos. In 1905, he spent a year studying theology and English at the University of St Andrews, Scotland, and transferred to the University of Oxford where he graduated in 1909.

He was ordained priest on 23 April 1910, raised to the rank of archimandrite and then on 12 December titular bishop consecrated of Stauropolis. In 1918 he was elevated to metropolitan bishop of Serrai.

== Metropolitan of Australia and New Zealand ==
The Ecumenical Patriarchate in Constantinople established the Metropolis of Australia and New Zealand in 1924 and appointed Christophoros as hierarch. Metropolitan Christophoros arrived in Australia on 8 July 1924 to begin a stormy tenure. He was confronted by Archimandrite Irenaios Kasimatis, a priest who ignored the metropolitan and wrote inflammatory articles in the local Greek press. Factional rivalry and bitterness prevented Knitis from achieving much, and divisions in the church made his position untenable. In February 1928 he was recalled to Greece.

Father Theophylactos Papathanasopoulos was sent to Sydney as administrator until a new bishop arrived. Knitis was officially succeeded by Metropolitan Timotheos Evangelinidis in 1931.

== Metropolitan of Bizye ==
He was granted the title of Metropolitan of Bizye (East Thrace) and spent most of his remaining life back in Samos, where he died on 7 August 1959.

Eastern Orthodox Church titles
New title	Metropolitan of Australia and New Zealand; 1924–1928	Succeeded by Metropolitan Timotheos
