= Metropolitan Timotheos of Australia =

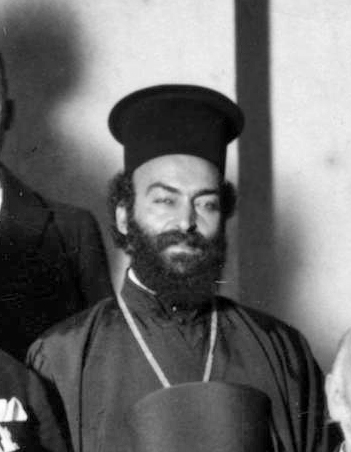
Archimandrite Timothy (Evangelinidis) in Warsaw as part of a delegation of the Patriarchate of Constantinople, who arrived to proclaim the autocephaly of the Polish Orthodox Church. 1925

Timotheos Evangelinidis (Greek: Τιμόθεος Ευαγγελινίδης; 23 April 1880 in Polichnitos, Lesbos – 6 October 1949 in Istanbul), was a Greek priest and Greek Orthodox bishop who presided over the Metropolis of Australia and New Zealand from 1931 to 1947, and the Metropolis of Rhodes from 1947 to 1949.

== Early life ==
He was born as Tilemachos Evangelinidis (Τηλέμαχος Ευαγγελινίδης) in the village of Polichnitos, on the island of Lesbos (then still part of the Ottoman Empire), on 23 April 1880.

He studied at the Evangelical School of Smyrna and the Great School of the Nation in Constantinople, before becoming a monk and serving as protosynkellos under the metropolitan of Methymna, Stephen, until 1910. He then studied in the Halki seminary until 1914, before going to Bucharest as parish priest for the local Greek community and teacher in the city's Greek college. In 1921 and for the next ten years, he served as apokrisiarios of the Patriarchate of Constantinople to the Romanian Orthodox Church.

== Metropolitan of Australia and New Zealand ==
Evangelinidis was elected as the second Metropolitan of Australia and New Zealand in 1931. The position had officially remained vacant since 1928, when his predecessor Metropolitan Christoforos Knitis had been recalled to Greece. Father Theophylactos Papathanasopoulos had presided over the Greek Orthodox Archdiocese of Australia and New Zealand until Metropolitan Timotheos arrived in Australia on 26 January 1932 (Australia Day).

On Sunday 10 November 1935, Timotheos opened and dedicated a Greek Orthodox church in Innisfail, Queensland. It was the second Greek Orthodox church to be opened in Queensland and the sixth in Australia.

== Metropolitan of Rhodes ==
On 16 January 1947, Metropolitan Timotheos was elected to head the Metropolis of Rhodes. He left his Australian post in March and was replaced as bishop by Theophylactos Papathanasopoulos. In June 1949, he was elected Archbishop of North and South America but was unable to assume the post due to a cardiac arrest. Unable to travel, he was re-instated as Metropolitan of Rhodes until his death in Istanbul on 6 October 1949. He was buried in the Balıklı Greek cemetery, until in 1961 his remains were transferred to his birthplace.

Eastern Orthodox Church titles
Preceded by Metropolitan Christoforos	Metropolitan of Australia and New Zealand; 1931–1947	Succeeded by Metropolitan Theophylactos
Preceded by Apostolos Tryphonos	Metropolitan of Rhodes; 1947–1949	Succeeded by Spyridon Synodinos
