= Assembly of Canonical Orthodox Bishops of Austria =

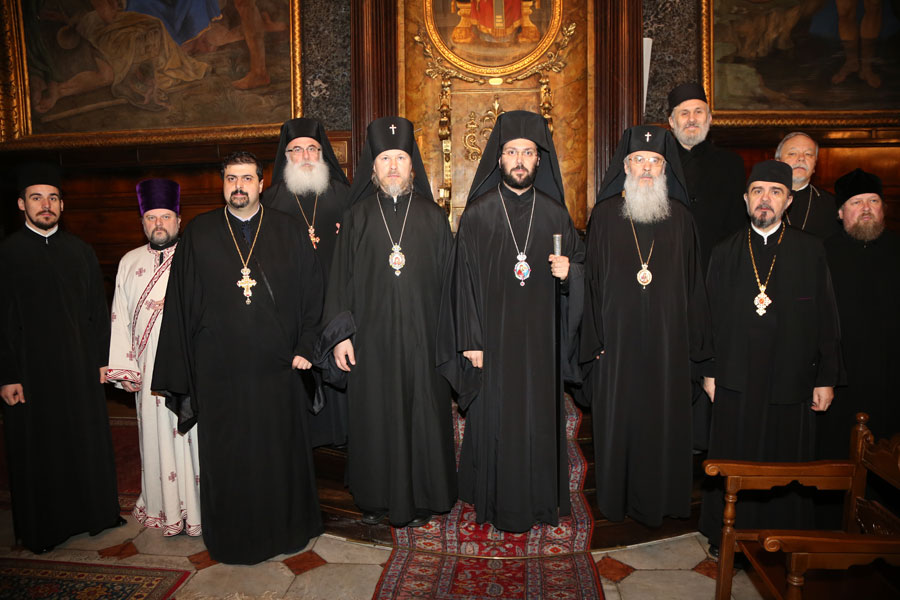
Orthodox bishops of Austria

The Assembly of Canonical Orthodox Bishops of Austria consists of all the active Eastern Orthodox bishops in Austria and Hungary, and representing multiple jurisdictions. It is not, properly speaking, a synod. The Episcopal Assembly of Austria is one of several such bodies around the world which operate in the so-called "diaspora."

== Overview ==
The assembly began when delegates from the 14 autocephalous Eastern Orthodox churches met at the Center of the Ecumenical Patriarchate in Chambésy, Switzerland, on June 6–12, 2009.

== Jurisdictions ==
The current jurisdictions in the region include the following, ordered according to diptych:

- Ecumenical Patriarchate
  - Greek Orthodox Metropolis of Austria and Exarchate of Hungary and Middle Europe
  - Ukrainian Orthodox Church - Diocese of Great Britain and Western Europe
- Antiochian Patriarchate - Archdiocese of Germany and Central Europe
- Moscow Patriarchate
  - Russian Orthodox Diocese of Vienna and Austria
  - Russian Orthodox Diocese of Budapest and Hungary
  - Russian Orthodox Diocese of Great Britain and Western Europe (ROCOR)
- Serbian Patriarchate
  - Serbian Orthodox Eparchy of Austria
  - Serbian Orthodox Eparchy of Buda (Hungary)
- Bulgarian Patriarchate - Eparchy of Central and Western Europe
- Romanian Patriarchate
  - Romanian Orthodox Metropolis of Germany and Central Europe
  - Romanian Orthodox Diocese of Gyula (Hungary)
- Georgian Patriarchate - Eparchy of Germany and Austria
- Macedonian Orthodox Church - Diocese of Europe

== See also ==
- Assembly of Canonical Orthodox Bishops of Great Britain and Ireland
- Assembly of Canonical Orthodox Bishops of France
- Assembly of Canonical Orthodox Bishops of Belgium, Holland, and Luxembourg
- Assembly of Canonical Orthodox Bishops of Spain and Portugal
- Assembly of Canonical Orthodox Bishops of Italy and Malta
- Assembly of Canonical Orthodox Bishops of Switzerland and Lichtenstein
- Assembly of Canonical Orthodox Bishops of Germany
- Assembly of Canonical Orthodox Bishops of Scandinavia
