= Assembly of Canonical Orthodox Bishops of Great Britain and Ireland =

The Assembly of Canonical Orthodox Bishops of Great Britain and Ireland (formerly the Episcopal Assembly of the British Isles) consists of all the active Orthodox bishops of the British Isles (the United Kingdom of England, Scotland, Wales, and Northern Ireland, as well as Ireland), representing multiple jurisdictions. It is not, properly speaking, a synod. The Episcopal Assembly of the British Isles is one of several such bodies around the world which operate in the so-called "diaspora."

Until the formation of the Assembly on June 21, 2010, there had not previously been any Inter-Orthodox Episcopal committee in Great Britain or Ireland.

== Overview ==
The assembly began when delegates from the 14 autocephalous Eastern Orthodox churches met at the Center of the Ecumenical Patriarchate in Chambésy, Switzerland, on June 6–12, 2009. At that time, the conference decided to sanction the establishment of episcopal assemblies in 12 regions of the so-called Eastern Orthodox diaspora which are beyond the boundaries of the autocephalous churches. Such assemblies have the authority to propose future administrative structures for the Church in their respective regions.

== Jurisdictions ==
The current jurisdictions in the region include the following, ordered according to diptych:

- Ecumenical Patriarchate
  - Greek Orthodox Archdiocese of Thyateira and Great Britain
  - Greek Orthodox Metropolis of Ireland
- Antiochian Patriarchate - Archdiocese of the British Isles and Ireland
- Moscow Patriarchate
  - Russian Orthodox Diocese of Sourozh
  - Archdiocese of Russian Orthodox Churches in Western Europe (Deanery of Great Britain)
  - Russian Orthodox Diocese of Great Britain and Western Europe (ROCOR)
  - Metropolis of Chișinău and All Moldova
- Serbian Patriarchate - Eparchy of Britain and Ireland
- Bulgarian Patriarchate - Eparchy of Central and Western Europe
- Romanian Patriarchate - Metropolis of Western and Southern Europe
- Georgian Patriarchate - Eparchy of Great Britain and Ireland
- Macedonian Orthodox Church - Diocese of Europe

== See also ==
- Assembly of Canonical Orthodox Bishops of Canada
- Assembly of Canonical Orthodox Bishops of the United States of America
- Assembly of Canonical Orthodox Bishops of Australia, New Zealand, and Oceania
- Assembly of Canonical Orthodox Bishops of France
- Assembly of Canonical Orthodox Bishops of Belgium, Holland, and Luxembourg
- Assembly of Canonical Orthodox Bishops of Spain and Portugal
- Assembly of Canonical Orthodox Bishops of Italy and Malta
- Assembly of Canonical Orthodox Bishops of Austria
- Assembly of Canonical Orthodox Bishops of Switzerland and Lichtenstein
- Assembly of Canonical Orthodox Bishops of Germany
- Assembly of Canonical Orthodox Bishops of Scandinavia
