= Zlata of Meglen =

Orthodox saint

Saint Zlata of Meglen
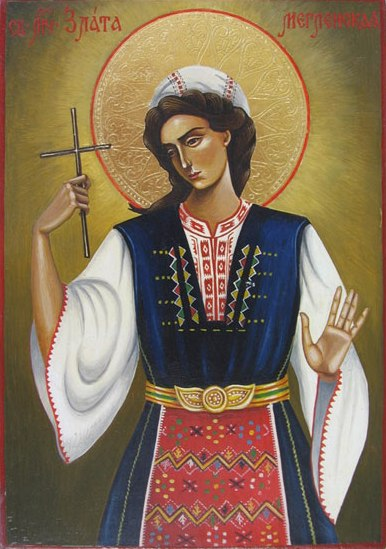

Great Martyr
- Born: Unknown; Slatina Ottoman Empire
- Died: 1795; Slatina Ottoman Empire
- Venerated in: Eastern Orthodox Church
- Feast: October 18

Portable icon by John Kasolas (1968)

Hieromonk Timotheos confesses and blesses St Chrysi

Saint Chrysi is abducted by the Muslims. Fresco at the Archangel's Monastery, Pella, Greece (1886)

St Chrysi's martyrdom. Fresco at the Archangel's Monastery, Pella, Greece (1886)

Zlata of Meglen (Bulgarian: Света Великомъченица Злата Мъгленска, Macedonian: Света Великомаченичка Злата Мегленска, Greek: Ἁγία Χρυσή; died October 13, 1795) is an 18th-century Eastern Orthodox saint and new martyr.

Zlata was born in the eighteenth century in the village of Slatina, in the province of Meglen (today Chrysi, Greece), to a poor, peasant family with three other daughters. She died on October 13, 1795. The Bulgarian Orthodox Church celebrates her feast day on October 18; the Greek, the Russian, the Serbian and the Macedonian Orthodox churches - on October 13. Her hagiography was written by Nicodemus the Hagiorite. In Bulgaria and North Macedonia Saint Zlata is often depicted as young woman, wearing a traditional folk costume. In Bulgaria, Saint Zlata is patron saint of all Bulgarians living abroad.

== Death ==
In 1759, the Christians of the region converted to Islam en masse, resulting in the seat of the Metropolis of Moglena being transferred to Katranitsa [present-day Pyrgoi, Kozani], approximately 85 kilometers to the southwest, and the metropolis being renamed the Metropolis of Moglena and Katranitsa. Consequently, those who remained Christian faced intense pressure from the local newly converted Muslims to renounce their faith. There was a Turk who saw her while she was gathering wood in the village together with other women. He kidnapped her with the help of his Turkish friends. He then tried to forcefully convert her to Islam and make her marry him, promising her material wealth but the saint firmly rejected. For six months, the Turk and his wives tried to persuade her to marry him and after their unsuccessful attempts they threatened to her parents and sisters to convince her to Turkicize. When the kidnapper saw his schemes could not convince the saint, he locked her up in darkness for three months and started flagellating her every day, cutting her skin and putting an overheated rod through her ears. Her family, under the intimidation of the Turks, tried to dissuade her from suffering but she refused. In the midst of her deep tragedy, she called for her father's spiritual father Timotheus so that he prays for her to Jesus Christ. She was eventually hung on a tree by the Turks and cut to pieces. Her relics were collected by Christians in secret and she was buried. She died in the month of October 1795.

== Churches ==
There are several churches which carry the name of Saint Zlata of Meglen. In Zagreb, the St. Zlata Meglenska's Church, Zagreb raised for the Macedonian community started being built in 2016 and was put in function and consecrated on May 21, 2023. In Werribee, Australia there is also a church named Zlata Meglenska for the Macedonian community which celebrated its 20th anniversary on October 10, 2017. In Greece, there is the Church of Saint Chrysi in the village of Chrysi in the Region of Pella, concecrated by Chrysostomos, Metropolitan of Edessa, Pella and Almopia in 1996.

== Finding and translation of her relics ==
In 2009, Konstantinos Kodzampoyioukis, a parish priest of the village of Piperia, discovered her relics next to the ruins of the cathedral of the former Metropolis of Moglena, at the Byzantine castle of Moglena, 400–500 meters from the village of Chrysi. These were examined by the Forensic Service of Thessaloniki and two specialized scientific laboratories in Germany, which, among other findings, determined that they belong to a woman aged approximately 17 who was put to death in 1795. Her skull and ribs bear clear signs of the torture she endured. The translation of the relics took place on October 12, 2026.

== See also ==
- List of saints of the Serbian Orthodox Church

== Sources ==
- Житие и страдание на Света Великомъченица Злата Мъгленска. (Life and Suffering of Saint Great Martyr Zlata of Maglen) (in Bulgarian)
- Национална библиотека "Св.св. Кирил и Методий" (in Bulgarian)
