= Assembly of Canonical Orthodox Bishops of Germany =

The Assembly of Canonical Orthodox Bishops of Germany consists of all the active Eastern Orthodox bishops in Germany, and representing multiple jurisdictions. It is not, properly speaking, a synod. The Episcopal Assembly of Germany is one of several such bodies around the world which operate in the so-called "diaspora."

== Overview ==
The assembly began when delegates from the 14 autocephalous Eastern Orthodox churches met at the Center of the Ecumenical Patriarchate in Chambésy, Switzerland, on June 6–12, 2009.

== Jurisdictions ==
The current jurisdictions in the region include the following, ordered according to diptych:

- Ecumenical Patriarchate
  - Greek Orthodox Metropolis of Germany
  - Ukrainian Orthodox Church - Diocese of Great Britain and Western Europe
- Antiochian Patriarchate - Archdiocese of Germany and Central Europe
- Moscow Patriarchate
  - Russian Orthodox Diocese of Berlin and Germany
  - Archdiocese of Russian Orthodox Churches in Western Europe (Deanery of Germany)
  - Russian Orthodox Diocese of Berlin and Germany (ROCOR)
- Serbian Patriarchate - Eparchy of Düsseldorf and Germany
- Bulgarian Patriarchate - Eparchy of Central and Western Europe
- Romanian Patriarchate - Metropolis of Germany and Central Europe
- Georgian Patriarchate - Eparchy of Germany and Austria
- Macedonian Orthodox Church - Diocese of Europe

== See also ==
- Assembly of Canonical Orthodox Bishops of Great Britain and Ireland
- Assembly of Canonical Orthodox Bishops of France
- Assembly of Canonical Orthodox Bishops of Belgium, Holland, and Luxembourg
- Assembly of Canonical Orthodox Bishops of Spain and Portugal
- Assembly of Canonical Orthodox Bishops of Italy and Malta
- Assembly of Canonical Orthodox Bishops of Switzerland and Lichtenstein
- Assembly of Canonical Orthodox Bishops of Scandinavia
- Assembly of Canonical Orthodox Bishops of Austria
