= Botel Abbey =

Orthodox monastery in Dumfries and Galloway, Scotland

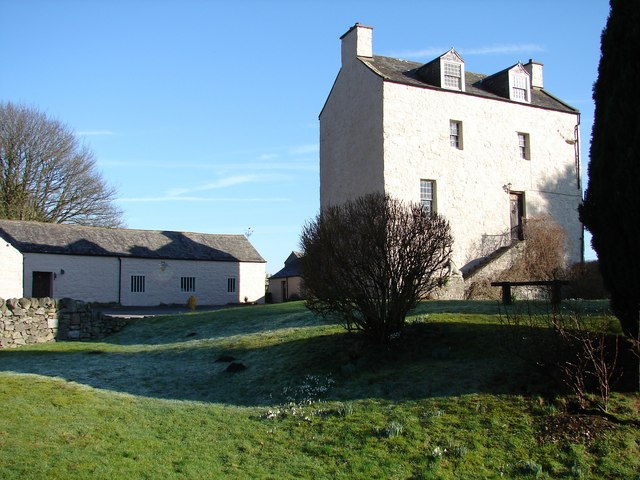

Monastery information
- Full name: Abbey of Saints Alban and Æthelwold
- Denomination: Western Rite Orthodoxy
- Established: 2017
- Dedication: Sts. Alban and Ethelwold
- Archdiocese: Archdiocese of the British Isles and Ireland

People
- Founder: Fr. James Cavendish
- Abbot: Fr. James Cavendish

Site
- Location: Buittle Castle, Dumfries and Galloway, Scotland
- Website: https://www.metbritain.org/nationalshrineolw

The Abbey of Saints Alban and Æthelwold, also known as Botel Abbey, is an Orthodox Monastery according to the Western Rite and Canon Regular traditions located in the grounds of Buittle Castle, Dumfries and Galloway, Scotland.

== History ==
The site of the historical castle was acquired by James Cavendish and Augustine Parker, then members of the Autonomous Orthodox Metropolia of North and South America and the British Isles, after the previous owner was arrested for tax fraud in 2017.

On September 29, 2019, Cavendish, at that time he was a Hierodeacon, was elevated to the rank of Abbot and Bishop by Metropolitan John LoBue.

The following day, he was consecrated with the title: "His Excellency, the Right Reverend Bishop James, Vicar-Bishop of Whithorn, Dumfries, and the Marches."

On February 10, 2025, Cavendish, serving as Abbot and Brotherhood of Botel Abbey, together with clergy and faithful formerly belonging to the Autonomous Orthodox Metropolia, were received into the Antiochian Orthodox Archdiocese of the British Isles and Ireland. The following day, Cavendish was ordained to the diaconate. Shortly thereafter, he was ordained to the priesthood with the rank of Heiromonk and pastor of Botel Abbey and the Parish of Our Lady & St. Ninian.

== Monastic life ==
=== Monastic Brotherhood of Saints Alban and Æthelwold ===
The Monastic Brotherhood of Saints Alban and Æthelwold is a community of Orthodox monastics following the Western Rite traditions and the Canonical Rule of Canons Regular. According to the abbey's website, the members of the brotherhood are currently resident in the historic buildings, and further plans are underway for hermitage-style accommodation in the abbey grounds.

=== St. Alban's Press ===
St. Alban's Press is a publishing imprint for general liturgical and devotional material, many of the publications of which are the work of the monastic life of the abbey.

=== The Dowry Workshop ===
The Dowry Workshop is an ecclesiastical supplier, through which the publications of St. Alban's Press are sold. Some members of the monastic brotherhood were also instrumental in founding the workshop. The workshop specialises in Gothic vestments, but also sells other goods, most of which are religious in nature. Since 2021, the Dowry Workshop has held a Warrant of Appointment from the Royal House of Habsburg.

=== Orthodox Shrine of Our Lady of Walsingham in Scotland ===
In the undercroft of the castle is the national Orthodox Shrine of Our Lady of Walsingham in Scotland. The Divine Office is celebrated there by the members of the monastic brotherhood.
