= Eastern Orthodoxy in the Philippines =

Eastern Orthodoxy in the Philippines, also known collectively as the Philippine Orthodox Church, refers to the Eastern Orthodox presence in the Philippines as a whole.

== Overview ==
In 1989, Alexander Athos Adamson (né Adamopoulos; a co-founder of Adamson University) saw the need to establish the first Greek Orthodox church in the Philippines. He established the Hellenic Orthodox Foundation, Inc., but died in 1993 before the church was completed. The Annunciation Orthodox Cathedral in Sucat, Parañaque, Metro Manila, was completed in 1996, and consecrated by Ecumenical Patriarch Bartholomew I of Constantinople in 2000.

Since then, other autocephalous Eastern Orthodox churches have established their presences in the Philippines, particularly in Mindanao. Alongside the local Greek community, a small community of Serbians and Russians living in the Philippines conduct their own liturgies.

There are an estimated 2,500 Eastern Orthodox Christians living in the country, belonging chiefly to the Moscow Patriarchate, the Patriarchate of Antioch, and the Ecumenical Patriarchate.

== Churches ==
There are three autocephalous Eastern Orthodox churches in the Philippines with overlapping jurisdictions:

- Antiochian Orthodox Christian Mission in the Philippines – under the Antiochian Orthodox Christian Archdiocese of Australia, New Zealand and the Philippines of the Greek Orthodox Patriarchate of Antioch and All the East
- Exarchate of the Philippines – under the Orthodox Metropolitanate of Hong Kong and Southeast Asia of the Ecumenical Patriarchate of Constantinople
- Patriarchate of Moscow – this jurisdiction has two subdivisions:
  - Diocese of the Philippines and Vietnam, under the Patriarchal Exarchate in Southeast Asia
  - Philippine Mission of the Russian Orthodox Church outside Russia, under the semiautonomous Russian Orthodox Church outside Russia (ROCOR).

== See also ==
- Religion in the Philippines
- Christianity in the Philippines
