= Assembly of Canonical Orthodox Bishops of Spain and Portugal =

The Assembly of Canonical Orthodox Bishops of Spain and Portugal (Spanish: Asamblea episcopal ortodoxa de España y Portugal) consists of all the active Orthodox bishops serving Spain, Portugal, Andorra and Gibraltar, and representing multiple jurisdictions. It is not, properly speaking, a synod. It is one of several such bodies around the world which operate in the so-called "diaspora."

== Overview ==
The assembly began when delegates from the 14 autocephalous Eastern Orthodox churches met at the Center of the Ecumenical Patriarchate in Chambésy, Switzerland, on June 6–12, 2009. At that time, the conference decided to sanction the establishment of episcopal assemblies in 12 regions of the so-called Eastern Orthodox diaspora which are beyond the boundaries of the autocephalous churches. Such assemblies have the authority to propose future administrative structures for the Church in their respective regions.

== Jurisdictions ==
The current jurisdictions in the region include the following, ordered according to diptych:

- Ecumenical Patriarchate
  - Greek Orthodox Metropolis of Spain and Portugal, and Exarchate of the Mediterranean Sea
  - Ukrainian Orthodox Church - Diocese of Great Britain and Western Europe
- Antiochian Patriarchate - Archdiocese of France, Western and, Southern Europe
- Moscow Patriarchate
  - Russian Orthodox Church Diocese of Spain and Portugal
  - Russian Orthodox Diocese of Great Britain and Western Europe (ROCOR)
- Serbian Patriarchate - Eparchy of Western Europe
- Bulgarian Patriarchate - Eparchy of Central and Western Europe
- Romanian Patriarchate - Metropolis of Western and Southern Europe
- Georgian Patriarchate - Eparchy of Western Europe

== Inaugural Assembly (2010) ==
The first act the Assembly took place in 2010 in the Holy Church Cathedral of Saints Andrew and Demetrius, in Madrid's Nicaragua Street. After a visit to the cathedral and the recitation of the Lord's Prayer, Metropolitan Polycarp, ex officio President of the Assembly, offered some words. He denied the Westerners' view of Orthodoxy as divided, since there is only one Orthodox Church, united in faith, sacraments, canons and sacred tradition. The apparent division is only administrative. He added, however, that the Church is indeed moving towards a Pan-Orthodoxy, from which is born the Orthodox Episcopal Assembly of Spain and Portugal.

Father Demetrio (Rogelio) Sáez Carbó, Archimandrite of the Ecumenical Throne, in his capacity as secretary, was in charge of explaining the details of the configuration of the Episcopal Assembly, composed of Metropolitan Polycarp, of the Ecumenical Patriarchate, as president; Archbishop Nestor, of the Patriarchate of Moscow and All Russia, as vice-president; Bishop Lucas, of the Patriarchate of Serbia; Bishop Timothy, of the Patriarchate of Romania; and a prelate to be designated from the Patriarchate of Bulgaria. The seat was fixed at the offices of the Orthodox Archbishopric of Spain and Portugal in Madrid. To be part of the Assembly, the canonical Churches must fulfill two requirements: to have representation -at least one parish- in the Iberian countries and territories with the authorization of their Mother Church and to be registered in the Registry of Religious Entities of the Ministry of Justice.

In recent years, the Orthodox community has grown exponentially in the Iberian Peninsula. It is estimated that, at present, there are about one and a half million Orthodox belonging to the different Patriarchates.

== See also ==
- Assembly of Canonical Orthodox Bishops of Latin America
- Assembly of Canonical Orthodox Bishops of Great Britain and Ireland
- Assembly of Canonical Orthodox Bishops of France
- Assembly of Canonical Orthodox Bishops of Belgium, Holland, and Luxembourg
- Assembly of Canonical Orthodox Bishops of Italy and Malta
- Assembly of Canonical Orthodox Bishops of Austria
- Assembly of Canonical Orthodox Bishops of Switzerland and Lichtenstein
- Assembly of Canonical Orthodox Bishops of Germany
- Assembly of Canonical Orthodox Bishops of Scandinavia
