= Assembly of Canonical Orthodox Bishops of Australia, New Zealand, and Oceania =

The Assembly of Canonical Orthodox Bishops of Australia, New Zealand, and Oceania (formerly the Episcopal Assembly of Oceania) consists of all the active Orthodox bishops in Oceanía representing multiple jurisdictions. It may be considered a successor to SCCOCA (Standing Conference of Canonical Orthodox Churches in Australia). However, it is not, properly speaking, a synod. It is one of several such bodies around the world which operate in the so-called "diaspora."

== Overview ==
The assembly began when delegates from the 14 autocephalous Eastern Orthodox churches met at the Center of the Ecumenical Patriarchate in Chambésy, Switzerland, on June 6–12, 2009. At that time, the conference decided to sanction the establishment of episcopal assemblies in 12 regions of the so-called Eastern Orthodox diaspora which are beyond the boundaries of the autocephalous churches. Such assemblies have the authority to propose future administrative structures for the Church in their respective regions.

== Jurisdictions ==
The current jurisdictions in the region include the following, ordered according to diptych:

- Ecumenical Patriarchate
  - Greek Orthodox Archdiocese of Australia and Exarchate of Papua New Guinea
  - Greek Orthodox Metropolis of New Zealand and Exarchate of All Oceania
  - Ukrainian Orthodox Church - Diocese of Australia and New Zealand
- Antiochian Patriarchate - Archdiocese of Australia, New Zealand and the Philippines
- Russian Patriarchate - Diocese of Sydney, Australia and New Zealand (ROCOR)
- Serbian Patriarchate - Metropolitanate of Australia and New Zealand
- Bulgarian Patriarchate - Eparchy of the USA, Canada and Australia
- Romanian Patriarchate - Eparchy of Australia and New Zealand
- Georgian Patriarchate - Eparchy of Australia

== See also ==
- Assembly of Canonical Orthodox Bishops of Canada
- Assembly of Canonical Orthodox Bishops of the United States of America
- Assembly of Canonical Orthodox Bishops of Great Britain and Ireland
