= Assembly of Canonical Orthodox Bishops of France =

The Assembly of Canonical Orthodox Bishops of France (French: Assemblée des évêques orthodoxes de France) consists of all the active Orthodox bishops serving France and Monaco, and representing multiple jurisdictions. It is not, properly speaking, a synod. It is one of several such bodies around the world which operate in the so-called "diaspora."

== Overview ==
The assembly began when delegates from the 14 autocephalous Eastern Orthodox churches met at the Center of the Ecumenical Patriarchate in Chambésy, Switzerland, on June 6–12, 2009. At that time, the conference decided to sanction the establishment of episcopal assemblies in 12 regions of the so-called Eastern Orthodox diaspora which are beyond the boundaries of the autocephalous churches. Such assemblies have the authority to propose future administrative structures for the Church in their respective regions.

== Jurisdictions ==
The current jurisdictions in the region include the following, ordered according to diptych:

- Ecumenical Patriarchate
  - Greek Orthodox Metropolis of France
  - Ukrainian Orthodox Church - Diocese of Great Britain and Western Europe
- Antiochian Patriarchate - Archdiocese of France, Western, and Southern Europe
- Moscow Patriarchate
  - Russian Orthodox Diocese of Chersonesus
  - Archdiocese of Russian Orthodox Churches in Western Europe
  - Russian Orthodox Diocese of Great Britain and Western Europe (ROCOR)
- Serbian Patriarchate - Eparchy of Western Europe
- Bulgarian Patriarchate - Eparchy of Central and Western Europe
- Romanian Patriarcate - Metropolis of Western and Southern Europe
- Georgian Patriarchate - Eparchy of Western Europe
- Macedonian Orthodox Church - Diocese of Europe

== See also ==
- Assembly of Canonical Orthodox Bishops of Great Britain and Ireland
- Assembly of Canonical Orthodox Bishops of Belgium, Holland, and Luxembourg
- Assembly of Canonical Orthodox Bishops of Spain and Portugal
- Assembly of Canonical Orthodox Bishops of Italy and Malta
- Assembly of Canonical Orthodox Bishops of Austria
- Assembly of Canonical Orthodox Bishops of Switzerland and Lichtenstein
- Assembly of Canonical Orthodox Bishops of Germany
- Assembly of Canonical Orthodox Bishops of Scandinavia
