= Assembly of Canonical Orthodox Bishops of Belgium, Holland, and Luxembourg =

The Assembly of Canonical Orthodox Bishops of Belgium, Holland, and Luxembourg consists of all the active Eastern Orthodox bishops in Belgium, the Netherlands, and Luxembourg, and representing multiple jurisdictions. It is not, properly speaking, a synod.

== Overview ==
The assembly began when delegates from the 14 autocephalous Eastern Orthodox churches met at the Center of the Ecumenical Patriarchate in Chambésy, Switzerland, on June 6–12, 2009.

== Jurisdictions ==
The current jurisdictions in the region include the following, ordered according to diptych:

- Ecumenical Patriarchate
  - Greek Orthodox Metropolis of Belgium and Exarchate of the Netherlands and Luxembourg
  - Ukrainian Orthodox Church - Diocese of Great Britain and Western Europe
- Antiochian Patriarchate
  - Antiochian Orthodox Archdiocese of France, Western, and Southern Europe
  - Antiochian Orthodox Archidocese of Germany and Central Europe
- Moscow Patriarchate
  - Russian Orthodox Diocese of Brussels and Belgium
  - Russian Orthodox Diocese of The Hague and the Netherlands
  - Archdiocese of Russian Orthodox Churches in Western Europe (Deanery of the Benelux)
  - Russian Orthodox Diocese of Great Britain and Western Europe (ROCOR)
- Serbian Patriarchate - Eparchy of Western Europe
- Bulgarian Patriarchate - Eparchy of Central and Western Europe
- Romanian Patriarchate
  - Romanian Orthodox Metropolis of Western and Southern Europe
  - Romanian Orthodox Metropolis of Germany and Central Europe
- Georgian Patriarchate - Eparchy of Belgium and Netherlands

== See also ==
- Assembly of Canonical Orthodox Bishops of Great Britain and Ireland
- Assembly of Canonical Orthodox Bishops of France
- Assembly of Canonical Orthodox Bishops of Spain and Portugal
- Assembly of Canonical Orthodox Bishops of Italy and Malta
- Assembly of Canonical Orthodox Bishops of Austria
- Assembly of Canonical Orthodox Bishops of Switzerland and Lichtenstein
- Assembly of Canonical Orthodox Bishops of Germany
- Assembly of Canonical Orthodox Bishops of Scandinavia
