= Chrysi =

Chrysi (literally means "Golden" in Greek) may refer to the following places:

- Chrysi, the Ancient Greek naming for Indochina.
- Chrysi (island), an uninhabited island near eastern Crete
- Chrysi, Kastoria, a village in the municipal unit Arrenes, Kastoria regional unit
- Chrysi, Pella, a village in the municipal unit Exaplatanos, Pella regional unit
- Princess Chrysí of Greece and Denmark (born 1981), member of the Greek royal family
