= Assembly of Canonical Orthodox Bishops of Scandinavia =

The Assembly of Canonical Orthodox Bishops of Scandinavia consists of all the active Eastern Orthodox bishops serving Sweden, Norway, Denmark, and Iceland, and representing multiple jurisdictions. It is not, properly speaking, a synod. The Episcopal Assembly of Scandinavia is one of several such bodies around the world which operate in the so-called "diaspora."

== Overview ==
The assembly began when delegates from the 14 autocephalous Eastern Orthodox churches met at the Center of the Ecumenical Patriarchate in Chambésy, Switzerland, on June 6–12, 2009.

== Jurisdictions ==
The current jurisdictions in the region include the following, ordered according to diptych:

- Ecumenical Patriarchate - Greek Orthodox Metropolis of Sweden and all Scandinavia and Exarchate of the Northern Countries
- Moscow Patriarchate - Archdiocese of Russian Orthodox Churches in Western Europe (Deanery of Scandinavia)
- Serbian Patriarchate - Eparchy of Scandinavia
- Romanian Patriarchate - Metropolis of Germany and Central and Northern Europe
- Macedonian Orthodox Church - Diocese of Europe

== See also ==
- Assembly of Canonical Orthodox Bishops of Great Britain and Ireland
- Assembly of Canonical Orthodox Bishops of France
- Assembly of Canonical Orthodox Bishops of Belgium, Holland, and Luxembourg
- Assembly of Canonical Orthodox Bishops of Spain and Portugal
- Assembly of Canonical Orthodox Bishops of Italy and Malta
- Assembly of Canonical Orthodox Bishops of Switzerland and Lichtenstein
- Assembly of Canonical Orthodox Bishops of Germany
- Assembly of Canonical Orthodox Bishops of Austria
- Orthodox Church of Finland
