= Dioceses of Ireland =

History of Catholic and Anglican dioceses in Ireland

The pre-Reformation Christian church in Ireland was first divided into dioceses at the Synod of Ráth Breasail in 1111, although the dioceses of Dublin and Waterford were founded earlier by Hiberno Norse rulers with bishops consecrated by the Archbishop of Canterbury in England. The boundaries were reconfigured at the Synod of Kells in 1152 into 37 dioceses. A few were later abolished, as when Glendalough merged Dublin in 1214–16.

After the Reformation in Ireland, the established Anglican Church of Ireland was de jure the continuation of the pre-Reformation church. The Church Temporalities Act 1833 (3 & 4 Will. 4. c. 37) effected the abolition of 10 Church of Ireland dioceses by merger with neighbouring ones. Further mergers subsequently mean there are now 11 Church of Ireland dioceses in Ireland.

The Roman Catholic diocesan structure was prohibited under Penal Laws but bishops were consecrated abroad and visited Ireland in secret. By the eighteenth century, they had resumed residency. Although the Ecclesiastical Titles Act 1851 made it illegal for Roman Catholic dioceses to use the same names as those of the Church of Ireland and England, this was not enforced in Ireland. There are now 26 Roman Catholic dioceses in Ireland.

In 2024 the Greek Orthodox Metropolis of Ireland was established by the Ecumenical Patriarchate of Constantinople. Some other churches with diocesan structure include Ireland as part of the territory of a diocese whose see is elsewhere, such as the Serbian Orthodox Eparchy of Britain and Ireland (see in London) or the Russian Patriarchal Exarchate in Western Europe (see in Paris).

== See also ==
- List of Roman Catholic dioceses in Ireland
- List of dioceses of the Church of Ireland

== Sources ==
- Moody, Theodore William; Martin, Francis X.; Byrne, Francis John, eds. (25 March 2011) [1984]. "I: Maps" (PDF). Maps, Genealogies, Lists: A Companion to Irish History, Part II. A New History of Ireland. Vol. IX. Clarendon Press. maps 24–27 and 67–68, incl. notes, pp.26–27, 60, 101–102, 113–114. ISBN 9780199593064.
