= Russian Orthodox Church in Great Britain and Ireland =

Russian Orthodox Church in Great Britain and Ireland may refer to:

- Russian Orthodox Diocese of Sourozh
- Russian Orthodox Diocese of Great Britain and Western Europe
