= Ambrose Cantacuzène =

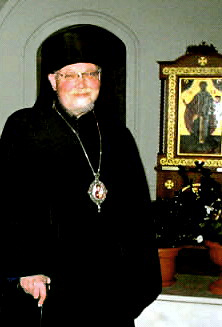

Bishop Ambrose (French: Evêque Аmbroіse, secular name Pierre Cantacuzène or Pyotr Petrovich Kantakuzen, Russian: Пётр Петрович Кантакузен; 16 September 1947 – 20 July 2009) was bishop of the Russian Orthodox Church Outside Russia, bishop of Vevey

== Life ==
Pierre Cantacuzène, was born on 3 September 1947, in Vevey, Switzerland to Prince Peter Georgievich Cantacuzène (1921-1976) and his wife, Princess Olga Alekseevna Orlova (1923-1984).

He received his education in the classics and then graduated from the law school at Lausanne University. From 1968 to 1975 he worked as a high school teacher of French and basic jurisprudence.

In 1972, in Vevey's Church of the Greatmartyr Barbara, during its patronal feast, he was tonsured a reader.

In 1974 he participated in the Third All-Diaspora Council.

From 1975 to 1978, he was sacristan at the Exaltation of the Cross Cathedral in Geneva, and received his theological education under the direction of Archbishop Anthony (Bartoshevich) of Geneva.

In the spring of 1976 in Geneva, he was ordained to the rank of deacon and 26 September of the same year he was ordained Priest and served at the Geneva Cathedral.

In the spring of 1978 he was appointed rector of the St. Barbara parish in Vevey, Switzerland.

He served in numerous parishes of the Western European Diocese: Brussels, Meudon, Lyon, Bari, Rome, and Montpellier. In 1991 he was elevated to archpriest.

6 September 1993, Fr. Peter was tonsured a monk and given the name Ambrose, after Saint Ambrose of Milan.

On 26 September 1993 he was consecrated bishop of Vevey, vicar for the Western-European diocese at the Exaltation of the Cross Cathedral in Geneva, Switzerland. The consecration was performed by Metropolitan Vitaly, Archbishop Anthony (Bartoshevich) of Geneva and Western Europe, Archbishop Mark (Arndt) of Berlin and Germany, and Bishop Seraphim (Dulgov) of Lesna.

On 17 October 2000 he was appointed Bishop of Geneva and Western Europe by the Council of Bishops of the ROCOR.

In May 2006, he was a member of the Fourth All-Diaspora Council in San Francisco, California. The Council of Bishops of the Russian Orthodox Church Outside of Russia convened from 15–19 May in San Francisco accepted the appeal of Bishop Ambrose to retire.

He died Monday, 20 July 2009 at 1 am, at his home in Vevey.

== Publications ==
- l'office de "Tous les saints de la terre d'Helvétie" (1982)
- Письмо Епископа Амвросия Архиерейскому Синоду Русской Православной Церкви Заграницей, 18/31 июля 1996 г.
- "Правильная Пасха к светлому празднику" // "Наша Газета", 25. 04. 2008
