= Cathedral of the Nativity of the Most Holy Mother of God and the Holy Royal Martyrs =

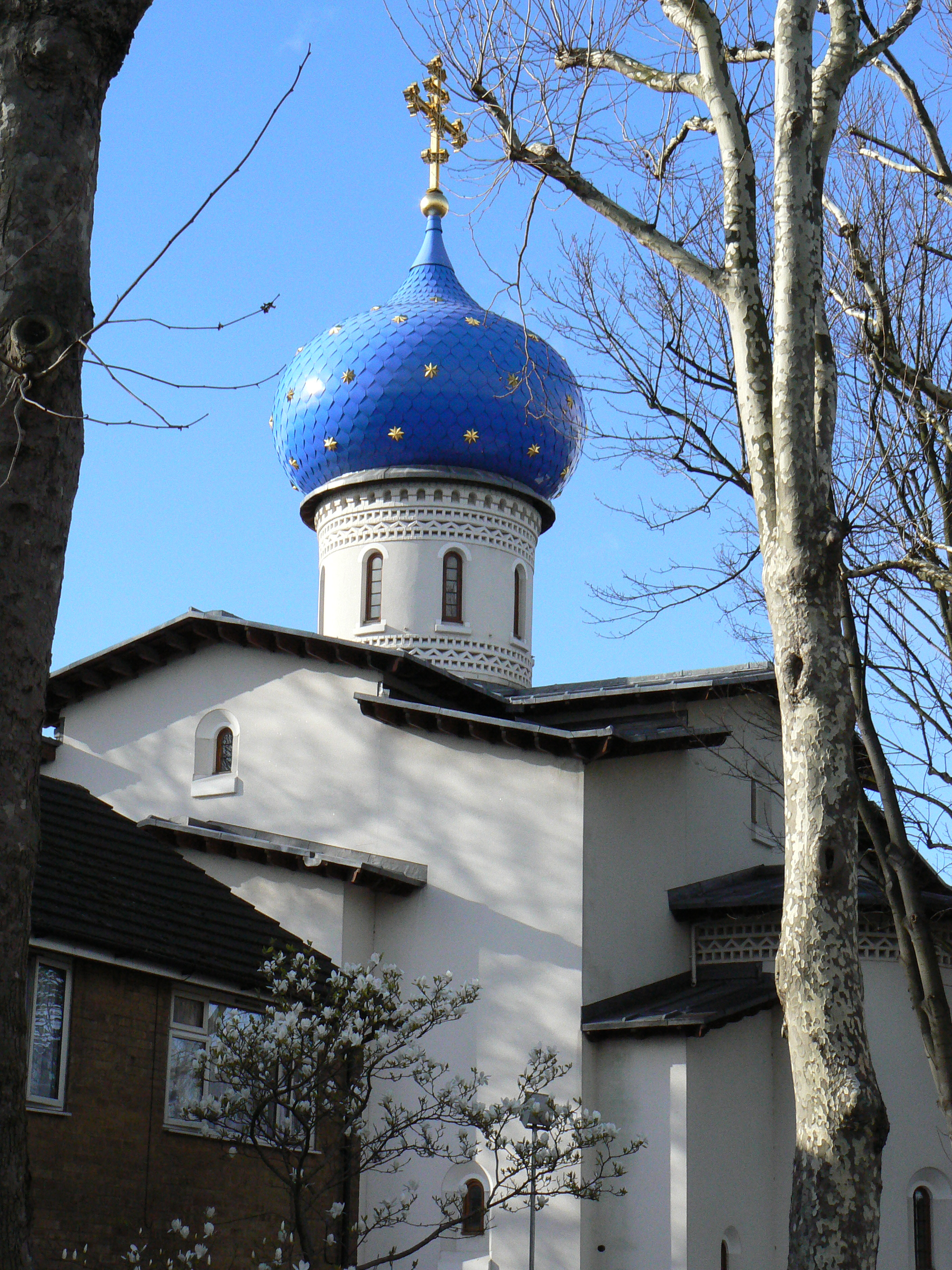
- Cathedral of the Nativity of the Most Holy Mother of God and the Holy Royal Martyrs
- 51.4896°N 0.2760°W
- Country: England
- Denomination: Russian Orthodox Church Outside Russia
- Website: orthodox-europe.org/english/parishes/london-cathedral/

Administration
- Diocese: Russian Orthodox Diocese of Great Britain and Western Europe

Clergy
- Bishop: Irenei
- Priest: Yaroslav Hudymenko

The Cathedral of the Nativity of the Most Holy Mother of God and the Holy Royal Martyrs is a Russian Orthodox Church Outside Russia cathedral on Harvard Road in Chiswick, West London. The cathedral is dedicated to the Nativity of the Theotokos and of the Holy Royal Martyrs (the last Romanovs), who were murdered in July 1918 by Russian Bolsheviks.

The Cathedral was opened in 1999, with a lesser consecration taking place in 2003, and a full consecration taking place in 2005.

== History ==
In early 1920, the Russian Orthodox Church Outside Russia was established, leasing St Philip's Church, Buckingham Palace Road from the Church of England for its worship from 1920 to that building's demolition in 1956. In 1928, Bishop Nicholas Karpoff became the first Orthodox Bishop in London since the 11th century Norman invasion.

In 1959, the Russian Orthodox Church In Exile Cathedral was opened on Emperor’s Gate, London; it shut down in 1989. 11 years after the closure of the Cathedral on Emperor's Lane, the Cathedral of the Nativity of the Most Holy Mother of God and the Holy Royal Martyrs was opened. It was fully consecrated in 2005.

== Liturgy ==
Divine Liturgy is mainly held in the Russian Orthodox Church Outside Russia's liturgical language, Church Slavonic, aside from on the third Sunday of the month, whereupon it is in English. The Sunday Sermon is preached in Russian and English.
