= Macedonian Orthodox Diocese of Europe =

Diocese of Europe Европска Епархија
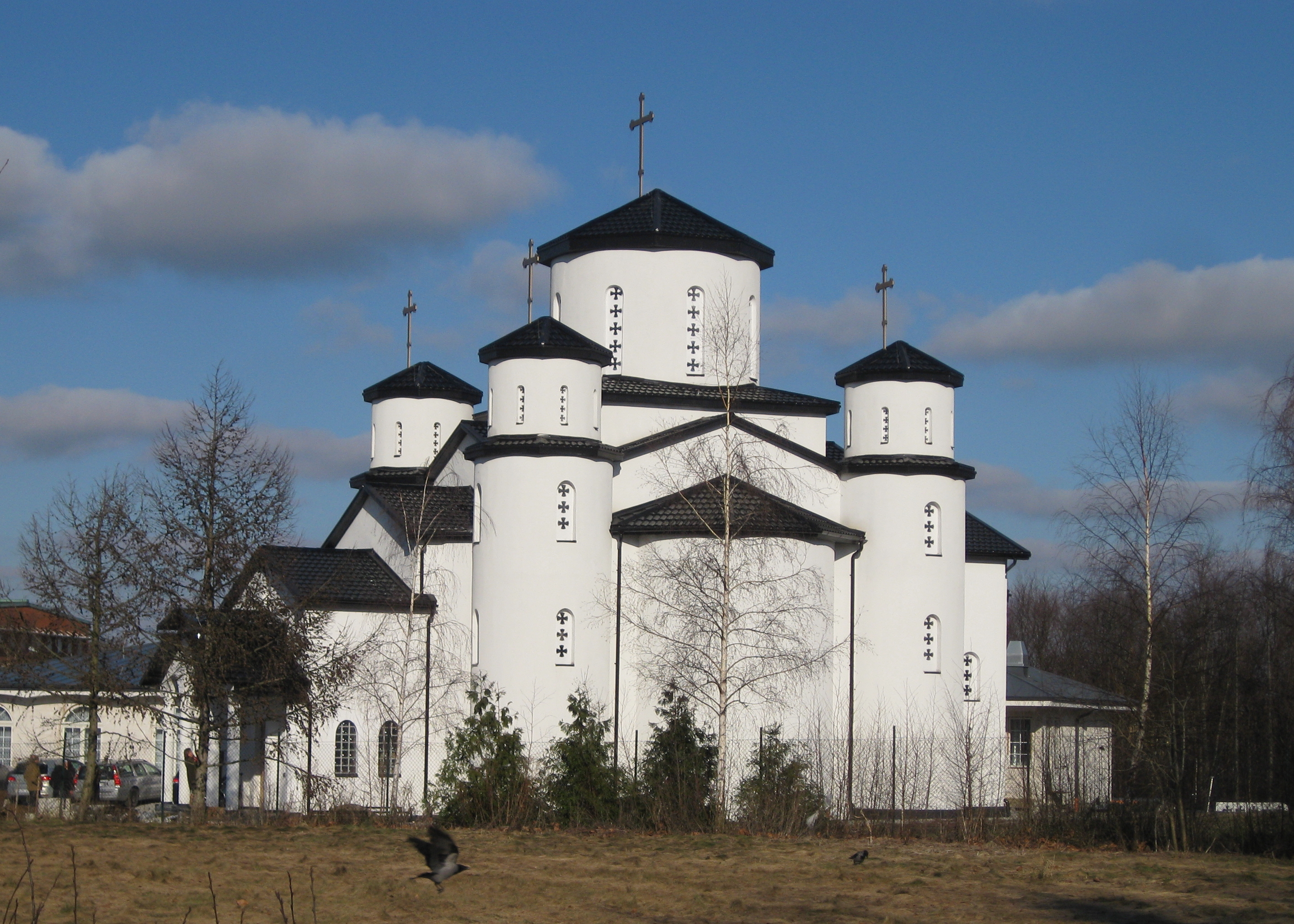
- Church of St. Naum of Ohrid in Malmö

Location
- Territory: Sweden; Germany; Italy; Slovenia; Austria; Croatia; Switzerland; France
- Headquarters: Malmö, Sweden

Information
- Denomination: Macedonian Orthodox
- Established: 4 December 1994
- Language: Church Slavonic; Macedonian

Current leadership
- Bishop: Metropolitan Pimen

Website
- mpee.mk

The Macedonian Orthodox Diocese of Europe is a diocese of the Macedonian Orthodox Church in Western Europe. It is led by Metropolitan Pimen of Europe from 6 April 2006.

The diocese today has 35 church communities across western European countries, of which 13 are in Germany. In its period of existence the diocese has built four new churches in Malmö, Triengen, Berlin and Mainz. Another one is being built in Zagreb. In London, the church worships in the chapel of the House of St Barnabas in Soho.

== List of Orthodox Churches ==
- Church of St. Naum of Ohrid in Malmö, Sweden
- Church of St. Nicholas in Mainz, Germany
- Church of St. Naum of Ohrid in Triengen
- Church of St. Clement of Ohrid in Berlin
- St. Zlata Meglenska's Church in Zagreb, Croatia
- Church of Saints Constantine and Helena in Rijeka, Croatia

== See also ==
- Assembly of Canonical Orthodox Bishops of Great Britain and Ireland
- Assembly of Canonical Orthodox Bishops of France
- Assembly of Canonical Orthodox Bishops of Italy and Malta
- Assembly of Canonical Orthodox Bishops of Austria
- Assembly of Canonical Orthodox Bishops of Switzerland and Lichtenstein
- Assembly of Canonical Orthodox Bishops of Germany
- Assembly of Canonical Orthodox Bishops of Scandinavia
