= Antiochian Orthodox Christian Mission in the Philippines =

The Antiochian Orthodox Christian Mission in the Philippines is a jurisdiction of the Antiochian Orthodox Church governed by the Antiochian Orthodox Archdiocese of Australia, New Zealand, Philippines, Marianas Island, and All Oceania. It is one of three Orthodox Christian jurisdictions in the Philippines.

On the year 2012 in Trece Martires City, Cavite begun to spread out the Orthodox faith through Rev. Fr. Petrus Villaviray with Rev. Fr. Dcn. Melchizedek Alberto F. Batac, became his assistant. They were both ordained by Metropolitan Paul Saliba.

Rev. Fr. Petrus Danilo Villaviray and Rev. Dcn. Melchizedek Alberto F. Batac both Established the Holy Theotokos (Mother of God) Church, with Ms. Anne Angelita P. Carpio as the co-founder and the first Pastoral President of the said Church.

After 3 years, Rev. Fr. Petrus, been retired because of illness. On the year 2015, Rev. Fr. Dcn. Melchizedek Alberto F. Batac replaced Rev. Fr. Petrus and became a Parish priest of the said Church after his been ordained on February 15, 2015, by Metropolitan Paul Saliba.

Since the year 2013 when he was a Deacon, he started the mission in Tanza Cavite and when he became a full pledge priest on the year 2015, Rev. Fr. Melchizedek Alberto F. Batac continued the mission at Tanza Cavite and spread out the Orthodox Faith, with the help of President of the Urban Poor Federation Founder in Tanza Cavite, Ms. Mary Merly D. Rada and all officers of the said Organization. He became a chaplain of Urban Poor Federation Organizations and later on, all the members of the said organization became converted as Orthodox faithfuls with 6,000 members.

Rev. Fr. Melchizedek Alberto F. Batac is one of the priest ordained by Metropolitan Paul Saliba on February 15, 2015 and his community is one of the place where Metropolitan Paul Saliba been visited, everytime he came to visit his churches in the Philippines.

== History ==
On November 5, 2007, the congregation of the Missionary Servants and Handmaids of St. Francis of Assisi, Inc. applied to join the Antiochian Orthodox Christian Archdiocese of Australia and New Zealand.

On February 28, 2008, the mission was accepted in principle by Metropolitan Archbishop Paul Saliba, Primate of Australia, together with Pentecostal Bishop Jeptah Aniceto, now the Vicar of the Davao Vicariate.

From May 19 to 22, 2008 Metropolitan Archbishop Paul visited the Philippines for the second time, where he had a colloquium with twelve candidates for ordination to the diaconate and the priesthood in Cogeo, Antipolo and visited the Antiochian Orthodox communities in Antipolo (Cogeo Village with 500 members, Bagong Nayon 2 with 500 members, Pagrai with 500 members and Sirona with 500 members), San Jose Del Monte City (Feliciano Subdivision, Brgy. Muzon with 500 members, and Pleasant Hills Subdivision, Brgy. San Manuel with 300 members and Kalookan City (Pangarap Village with 500 members).

Archbishop Paul ordained the Archpriest Yitzhak Pascualito D. Monsanto as the first Antiochian Orthodox priest in the Philippines and elevated him to the rank of Archpriest for the Manila Vicariate and designated as Senior Vicar, and will also cover the Davao Vicariate, which is located at Panacan City, Davao.

He also ordained into Methodius Carlito R. Rafanan, a former Roman Catholic priest of the Societas Verbi Divini (SVD, or Divine Word Missionaries) priest); to the priesthood; Ulrico Carlos G. Cabubas to the diaconate; and Abundio J. Delim, Jr., Michael A. Monsanto, Divino Z. Pedraza to the sub-diaconate. He deferred the ordination of the nine (9) candidates pending completion of the required studies on Orthodoxy. Rafanan had converted to Greek Orthodoxy and the Ecumenical Patriarchate, only to become Antiochian to be a priest again.

From May 23 to 26, 2008 Archbishop Paul traveled to Davao City with Vicar Yitzhak Pascualito D. Monsanto to ordain convert Pentecostal Bishop Jeptah Aniceto as the third Antiochian Orthodox priest in the Philippines and elevated him to archpriest for the Davao Vicariate. This priest shortly after ordination left the Orthodox Faith. Other priests left the Orthodox faith and later returned.

In 2009 Jeptah Aniceto left the Antiochian Church to pursue native religious teaching in Africa. His followers left the Antiochian Church as well and scattered.

== See also ==
- Philippine Orthodox Church
