= St Michael's Antiochian Orthodox Church =

Greek Orthodox Church in Otago, New Zealand

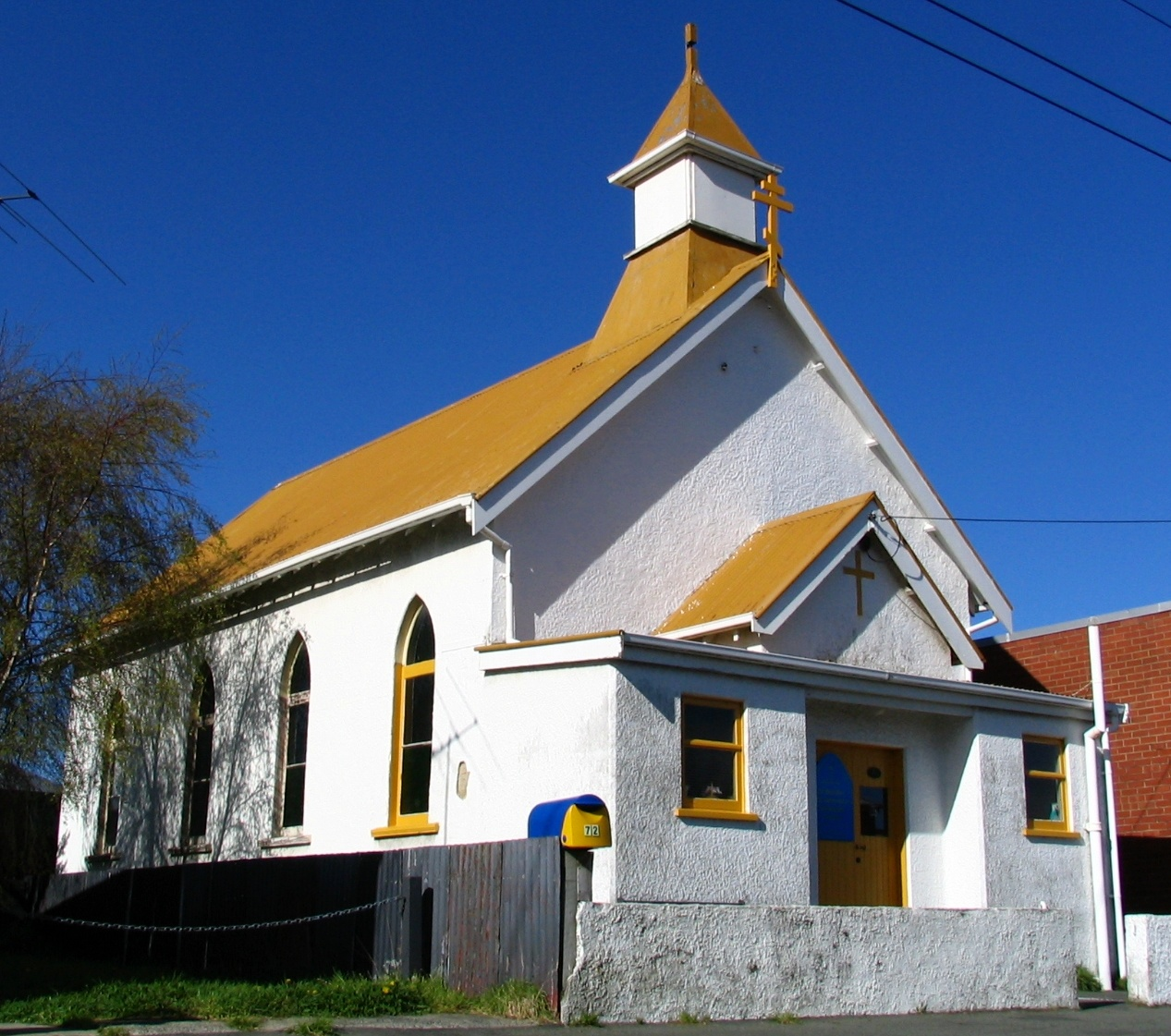
- St Michael's Antiochian Orthodox Church
- 45.9°S 170.51°E
- Location: 72 Fingall Street, South Dunedin, Otago
- Country: New Zealand

Architecture
- Completed: 1911

Administration
- Archdiocese: Antiochian Orthodox Archdiocese of Australia, New Zealand and the Philippines

Heritage New Zealand – Category 2
- Reference no.: 7341

St Michael's Antiochian Orthodox Church is a parish of the Greek Orthodox Patriarchate of Antioch in South Dunedin, New Zealand, within the Archdiocese of Australia, New Zealand and the Philippines. The parish church, built in 1911, was the first purpose-built Orthodox church in New Zealand. It is a Historic Place (Category II) of New Zealand (list number: 7341).

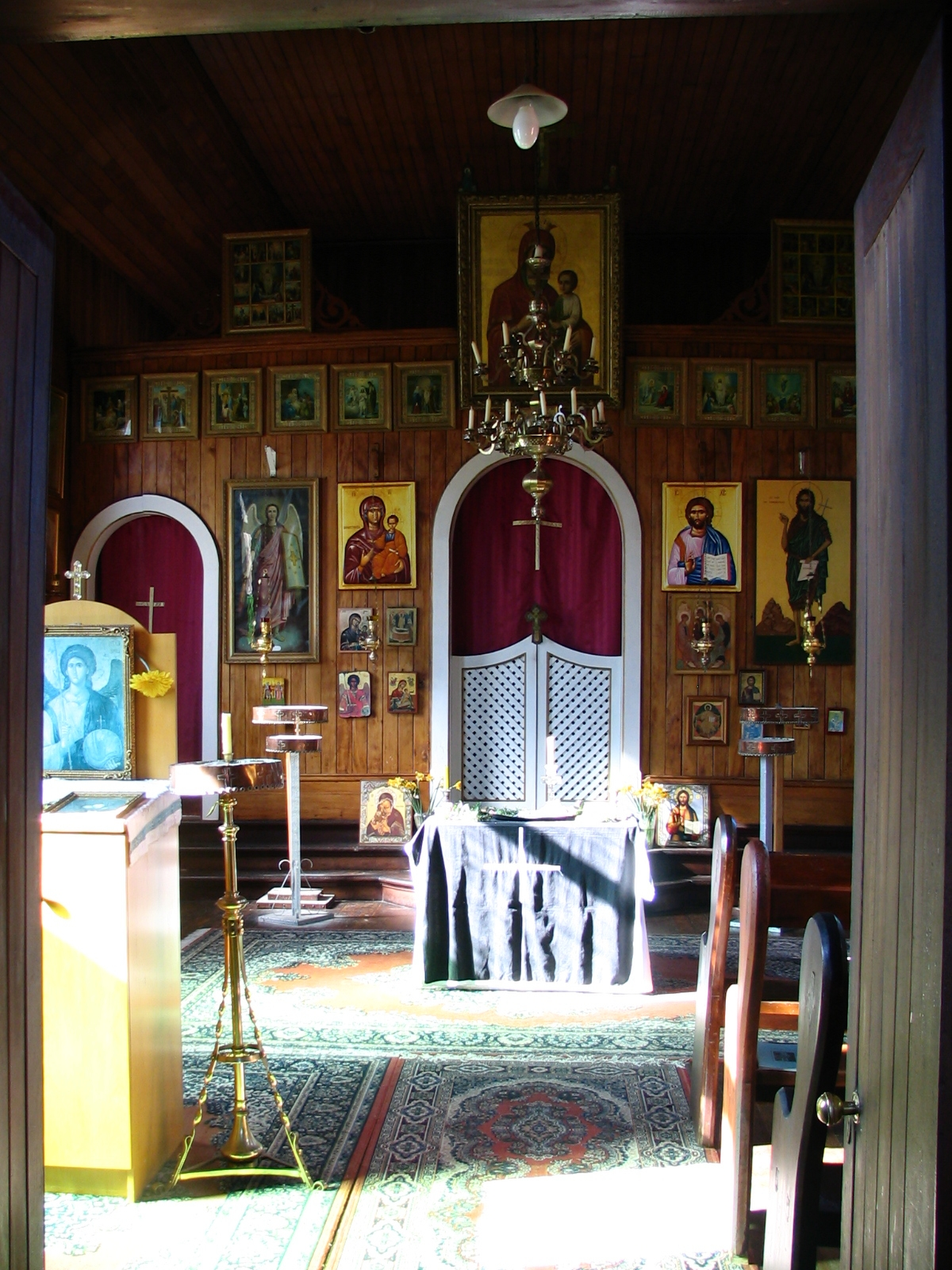
Interior of St Michael's Church

The exterior design of St Michael's is in simple Gothic Revival style while the interior is designed in Byzantine Revival style.

The church congregation includes about 50 families, many from Russia, Greece and Serbia.
