= Exarchate of the Philippines =

Philippine jurisdiction of the Ecumenical Patriarchate of Constantinople

The Exarchate of the Philippines (Note: Greek: Εξάρχεια των Φιλιππίνων; Tagalog: Eksarkado ng Filipinas; Spanish: Exarcado de Filipinas; Pampangan: Eksarkadu ning Filipinas; Zambal: Iksarkado nin Filipinas; Bikol: Eksarkado kan Filipinas; Cebuano: Eksarkado sa Filipinas; Ilocano: Eksarkado ti Filipinas; Ilonggo: Eksarkado sg Filipinas)) is an exarchate or sub-diocesan entity of the Eastern Orthodox Metropolis of Hong Kong and Southeast Asia which covers the Philippines. The metropolis is one of four in Asia under the jurisdiction of the Ecumenical Patriarchate of Constantinople. The exarchate currently has five parishes and three chapels in the country.

== History ==
Around the beginning of the seventeenth century, Greek sailors settled in Manila and Legazpi. The Greeks of Legazpi now number no more than 10 families have keep their Greek identities and have become distinguished public figures and intellectuals in the country. But as of now the population of the Greek community in the as a whole Philippines is unknown but its estimated about 129, 100 or 120 members.

In 1989, Adamopoulos saw the need to establish the first Greek Orthodox church in the Philippines and thus established the Hellenic Orthodox Foundation, Inc., but he died in 1993 before the church was completed. The Annunciation Orthodox Cathedral in Sucat, Parañaque, Metro Manila, was finished in 1996. Constructed in true Byzantine style and with interior furnishings imported from Greece, it serves hundreds of Orthodox faithful, Filipinos, the local Greek community and expats in the national capital.

On 20 April 1990, a Filipino hieromonk, Fr. Vincentius Escarcha (a former Benedictine Abbot and a Roman Catholic priest for more than 20 years in Bajada, Cataingan, Masbate), together with four nuns and faithful members of his community, were received into the Orthodox Church by Metropolitan Dionysios of the Greek Orthodox Metropolis of New Zealand and assisted by Bishop Sotirios of Zelon. On 19 January 1994, Metropolitan Dionysios and Bishop Sotirios received several Filipino Christians in Manila by Holy Chrismation.

In 1996, the Orthodox Metropolitanate of Hong Kong and Southeast Asia was created for the needs of the faithful under the Church of Constantinople. In 2004, the Theotokos Orthodox Church in Bajada was consecrated by Metropolitan Nikitas of Hong Kong and South East Asia. As of 2014 the nuns of the Theotokos Orthodox Monastery in Bajada ran a kindergarten.

On 5 March 2000, the Church of the Annunciation of the Theotókos was consecrated by His All-Holiness Ecumenical Patriarch Bartholomew I, with Metropolitans Ioakeim and Nikitas, Bishop Dionysios, and a significant number of clergy from overseas assisting. During the service, the entire congregation followed the Patriarch in circumambulating the church. The Patriarch told the people present that the only thing which can really lead man to the land of gladness is the perfect love for his fellow man and for God. The message from the Patriarchate of Constantinople is one of love for the people of Southeast Asia, one which assures people everywhere of the immeasurable love of Christ. Despite not being the bishop's seat—the cathedra—the church is sometimes called a "cathedral" because it is the only church in the metropolis blessed by the Ecumenical Patriarch.

Four other parishes, in Cataingan, Sbù, Los Baños and Hagónoy, have since been established, along with a few other chapels.

== Language ==
The Divine Liturgy and other Orthodox services are said in English, Greek and various Philippine languages.

== Parishes and chapels ==
=== Parishes ===
- Annunciation Orthodox Cathedral, Parañaque, Metro Manila
- Theotokos Orthodox Parish, Cataingan, Masbate
- Holy Trinity Orthodox Parish, Los Baños, Laguna
- Holy Resurrection Parish, Sbù, South Cotabato
- St. Isidore of Chios Parish, Hagónoy, Dávao del Sur

=== Chapels ===
- St. George Chapel, Makati
- St Nectarios Chapel, Quezon City, Metro Manila
- St Eleftherios Chapel, Sorsogon, Bicol

The Church of the Exaltation of the Holy Cross in Siniloan, Laguna, functioned alternatively in connection with Holy Trinity Parish in Los Baños before joining the Diocese of the Philippines and Vietnam of the Moscow Patriarchate.

== Clergy ==
Within the Ecumenical Patriarchate's Orthodox Metropolitanate of Hong Kong and Southeast Asia, there are currently six active Filipino priests in the Philippines, along with a some of nuns, all of whom are under the administrative authority of Metropolitan Nektarios of Hong Kong and Southeast Asia.

== See also ==
- Philippine Orthodox Church
