= Russian Orthodox Diocese of Great Britain and Western Europe =

Russian Orthodox Diocese

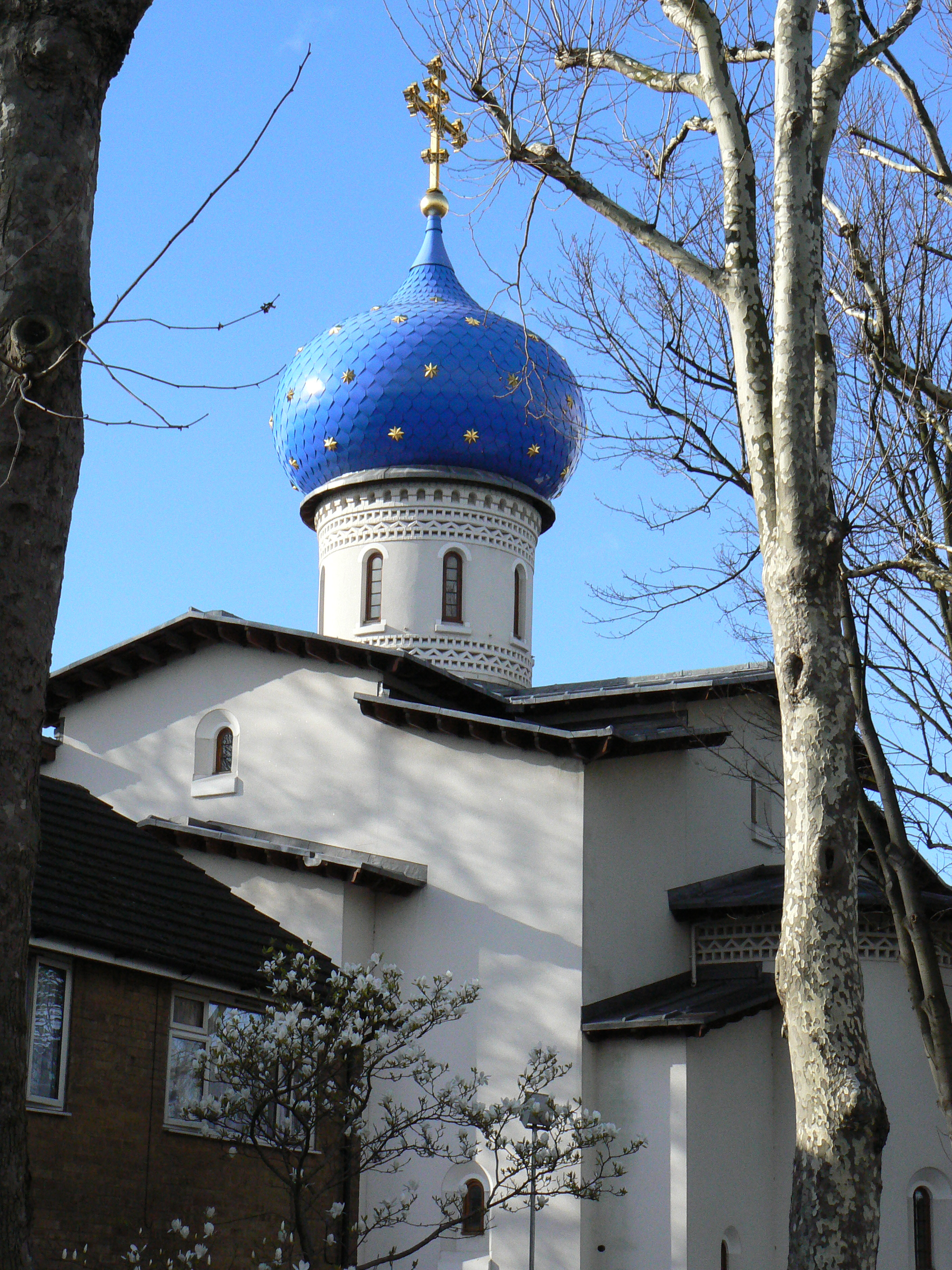
Orthodox Cathedral of the Nativity of the Most Holy Mother of God and the Holy Royal Martyrs in Chiswick, London.

The Diocese of Great Britain and Western Europe (Russian: Лондонская и Западно-Европейская епархия, romanized: Londonskaya i Zapadno-Yevropyeyskaya yeparkhiya) is a diocese of the Russian Orthodox Church Outside Russia (ROCOR), encompassing all of western Europe (from Italy to Ireland) but with communities primarily on territories of the United Kingdom, Switzerland and France.

The diocese currently comprises the Cathedral of the Nativity of the Most Holy Mother of God and the Holy Royal Martyrs, in Chiswick, London W4; and around thirty parishes, several mission parishes and chapels, and one monastic house. The diocesan bishop is Bishop Irenei (Steenberg) of London and Western Europe; Bishop Alexander (Ecchevaria) of Vevey serves as Vicar Bishop of the diocese, assisting in the administration of its parishes and pastoral life, especially in the Francophone regions of Europe. As of 2020 the diocese had 32 priests and 11 deacons, and a number of minor clergy.

== History ==
The origins of the Western Europe Diocese stretch back to the founding of the first Russian Orthodox parishes in Switzerland which led to the construction of the Geneva Cathedral in 1863.

Founded as the Archdiocese of Paris and Western Europe, it has had a varied history, being reorganised several times, with its headquarters moving to Brussels, to Geneva and, most recently, to London. In particular the Archdiocese was split in 1962: one diocese centered around Great Britain (Diocese of Richmond and Great Britain, then renamed Diocese of Great Britain, then renamed Diocese of Great Britain and Ireland), and another centered around continental Europe (the Russian Orthodox Diocese of Geneva and Western Europe, then renamed Brussels and Western Europe, then back to Russian Orthodox Diocese of Geneva and Western Europe). The two dioceses were reunited in 2018. The last bishop of the united archdiocese, previous to the current ruling bishop (Irenei) was St John the Wonderworker, who served in Western Europe from 1951 to 1962.

=== History of the Diocese of Great Britain and Ireland ===
The Diocese of Great Britain was founded in 1929 under Bishop Nicholas (Karpoff) of London, as part of the Archdiocese of Paris and Western Europe. In 1962 Bishop Nikodem (Nagaieff) was elevated to become Archbishop with the episcopal seat of Richmond. However, following the retirement of Bishop Constantine (Essensky) of Richmond in 1985, the diocese was without a resident bishop. The diocese was placed under the omophorion of Metropolitan Mark (Arndt) of Berlin and Germany until his retirement as ruling bishop of the Diocese of Great Britain in December, 2016. Subsequently the diocese was placed directly under Metropolitan Hilarion (Kapral) of New York, First Hierarch of the Russian Church Outside of Russia and administered by Bishop Irenei of Sacramento, vicar bishop of the Western American Diocese. At a meeting of the ROCOR Synod of Bishops on 20 September 2018, the British Diocese was reunited with that of Western Europe with Bishop Irenei appointed as ruling bishop.

== Cathedrals and places of importance ==
The Cathedral Parish, now served by the Diocesan Cathedral of the Nativity of the Mother of God (formerly Dormition of the Mother of God) was the mother parish of the diocese, having grown out of the original Russian Orthodox parish in London which met initially in the Church of the Dormition in Welbeck Street, London W1 and then for many years at Emperor's Gate, London SW7. The property in Emperor's Gate was owned by the Church of England which in 1989 evicted the Russian Orthodox parish. In 1990 the parish purchased land in Gunnersbury, Chiswick, London, W4 and plans were drawn up for a new cathedral to be built in the Pskov style. On 21 September 2018 the cathedral was consecrated, having been frescoed throughout. The parish has an active sisterhood and a parish school.

The Cathedral of the Exaltation of the Cross in Geneva is also part of the diocese, having been founded in 1863 on the site of the former monastery of St Victor which had been destroyed in 1536. It served as the diocesan cathedral of Western Europe from 1950 to 2017, and has been at the heart of the diocese since its founding.

The Brotherhood of St Edward at Brookwood, Surrey, was founded in 1982 to house the relics of St Edward the Martyr and served as an important spiritual centre for the Diocese. The Brotherhood refused to accept the restoration of canonical relations between the ROCOR and the Moscow Patriarchate and departed in January 2007 for the Old Calendarists Greek Orthodox Synod in Resistance, along with the Holy Annunciation Convent in Willesden, London NW6 which had been founded by St John the Wonderworker.

== Bishops of Western Europe (former) ==
Paris and Western Europe

- Metropolitan Eulogius (Georgievsky)
- Metropolitan Seraphim (Lukianov)

Brussels and Western Europe

- Archbishop Nathaniel (Lvov) (1946-1950)
- Archbishop St John the Wonderworker (1950-1962)

Geneva and Western Europe

- Archbishop Anthony (Bartochevitch) (1962-1993 [reposed])

Brussels and Western Europe

- Archbishop Seraphim (Dulgov) (1993-2002)

Geneva and Western Europe

- Bishop Ambrose (Cantacuzène) (2002-2006)
- Archbishop Michael (Donskoff) (2006-2017)

== Bishops of Great Britain (former) ==
Diocese of London

- Bishop Nicholas (Karpov) (30 June 1929 – 11 October 1932)
- Locum tenens, Archimandrite Vitaly (Ustinov) (1947-1951)
- Archbishop Nathaniel (Lvov) (1951)
- Bishop Nikodem (Nagaieff) (18 July 1952 – 1962)

Diocese of Richmond and Great Britain

- Archbishop Nikodem (Nagaieff) (1962 – 17 October 1976)
- Bishop Constantine (Essensky) (1981 - January 1986)

Diocese of Great Britain

- Archbishop Mark (Arndt) of Berlin, Germany and Great Britain (January 1986 - 8 December 2016)

Diocese of Great Britain and Ireland

- Metropolitan Hilarion (Kapral), locum tenens (December 2016 - 20 September 2018)

== Bishops of Great Britain and Western Europe ==
Diocese of London, Great Britain and Western Europe

- Bishop Irenei (Steinberg) (September 2018-current)

== See also ==
- Russian Orthodox Diocese of Sourozh
- Assembly of Canonical Orthodox Bishops of Great Britain and Ireland
- Assembly of Canonical Orthodox Bishops of France
- Assembly of Canonical Orthodox Bishops of Belgium, Holland, and Luxembourg
- Assembly of Canonical Orthodox Bishops of Spain and Portugal
- Assembly of Canonical Orthodox Bishops of Italy and Malta
- Assembly of Canonical Orthodox Bishops of Austria
- Assembly of Canonical Orthodox Bishops of Switzerland and Lichtenstein
