= Assembly of Canonical Orthodox Bishops of Switzerland and Liechtenstein =

The Assembly of Canonical Orthodox Bishops of Switzerland and Liechtenstein consists of all the active Eastern Orthodox bishops in Switzerland and Liechtenstein, and representing multiple jurisdictions. It is not, properly speaking, a synod. The Episcopal Assembly of Switzerland and Liechtenstein is one of several such bodies around the world which operate in the so-called "diaspora."

== Overview ==
The assembly began when delegates from the 14 autocephalous Eastern Orthodox churches met at the Center of the Ecumenical Patriarchate in Chambésy, Switzerland, on June 6–12, 2009.

== Jurisdictions ==
The current jurisdictions in the region include the following, ordered according to diptych:

- Ecumenical Patriarchate
  - Greek Orthodox Metropolis of Switzerland
  - Ukrainian Orthodox Church - Diocese of Great Britain and Western Europe
- Antiochian Patriarchate - Archdiocese of France, Western, and Southern Europe
- Moscow Patriarchate
  - Russian Orthodox Diocese of Chersonesus
  - Russian Orthodox Diocese of Great Britain and Western Europe (ROCOR)
- Serbian Patriarchate - Eparchy of Switzerland
- Bulgarian Patriarchate - Eparchy of Central and Western Europe
- Romanian Patriarchate - Metropolis of Western and Southern Europe
- Georgian Patriarchate - Eparchy of Western Europe
- Macedonian Orthodox Church - Diocese of Europe

== See also ==
- Assembly of Canonical Orthodox Bishops of Great Britain and Ireland
- Assembly of Canonical Orthodox Bishops of France
- Assembly of Canonical Orthodox Bishops of Belgium, Holland, and Luxembourg
- Assembly of Canonical Orthodox Bishops of Spain and Portugal
- Assembly of Canonical Orthodox Bishops of Italy and Malta
- Assembly of Canonical Orthodox Bishops of Germany
- Assembly of Canonical Orthodox Bishops of Scandinavia
