= Archdiocese of the British Isles and Ireland =

Orthodox Christian diocese

Archdiocese of Antiochian Orthodox Archdiocese of the British Isles and Ireland

Orthodox
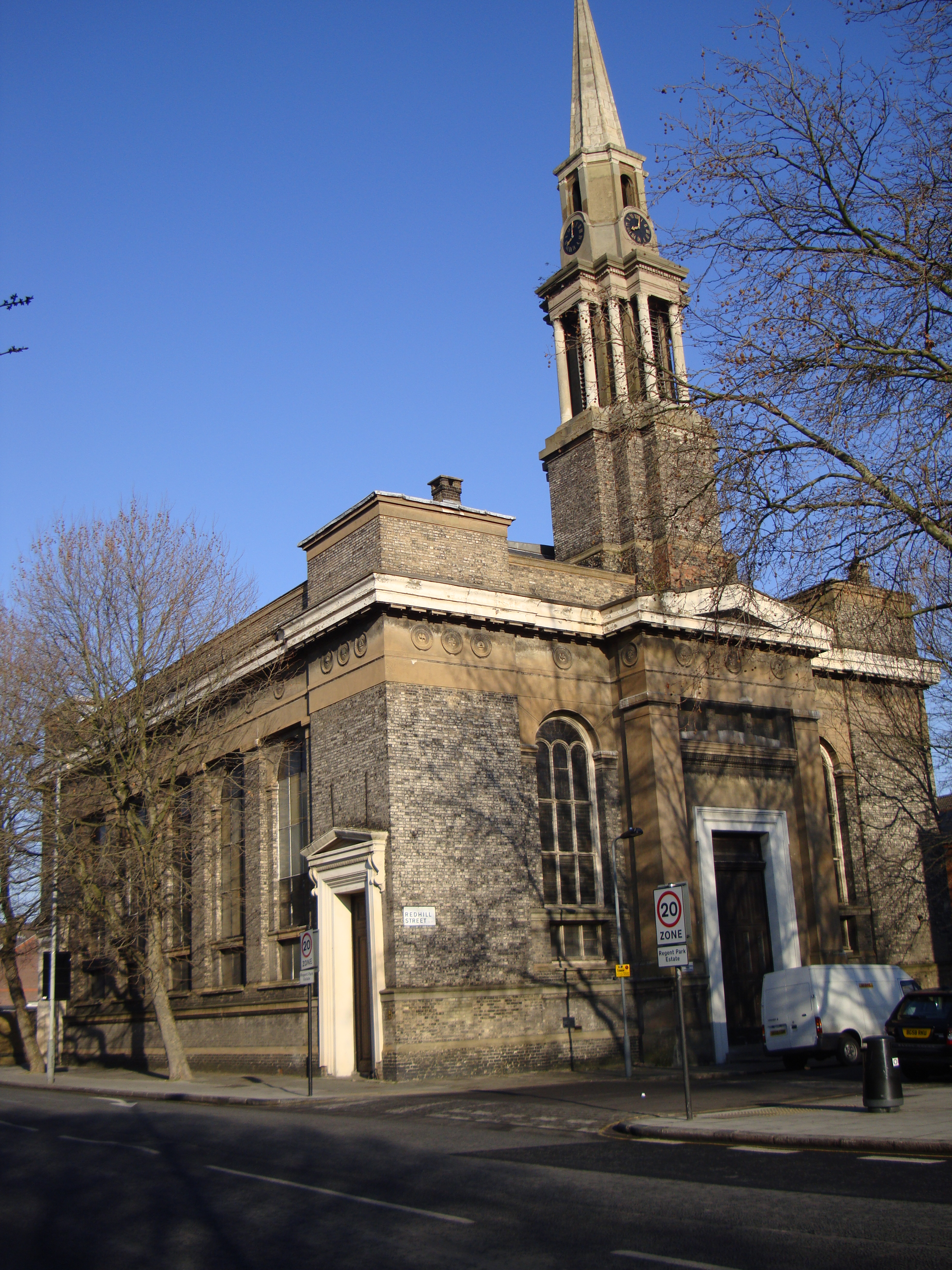

Location
- Territory: United Kingdom; Ireland
- Metropolitan: Metropolitan Silouan
- Headquarters: London

Information
- Denomination: Antiochian Orthodox Church
- Rite: Byzantine Rite
- Language: English, Arabic, Greek
- Parent church: Greek Orthodox Patriarchate of Antioch
- Patriarch: John X of Antioch

Website
- www.antiochian-orthodox.com

The Antiochian Orthodox Christian Archdiocese of the British Isles and Ireland is a regional archdiocese encompassing the whole of the British Isles, under the Greek Orthodox Patriarchate of Antioch and All the East.

== History ==
In the spring of 1995, the Antiochian Orthodox Deanery of the United Kingdom and Ireland was established, which united more than a dozen Orthodox Christian communities composed mainly of recent converts to Orthodoxy, primarily from the Church of England. Since 2000, the deanery was under the jurisdiction of the Metropolis of Western and Central Europe.

On 17 October 2013, the Holy Synod of the Church of Antioch established the Archdiocese of the British Isles and Ireland.

On 24 June 2015, after a period of deliberation, Archimandrite Silouan Oner was elected by the Holy Synod of the Church of Antioch to serve as the first Metropolitan of the Archdiocese. On 30 August 2015, Oner received his episcopal consecration at the Monastery of St George, Al-Humraiyah in Syria. Oner was enthroned on 27 February 2016.

== See also ==
- List of Greek Orthodox Antiochian Churches in Europe
- Greek Orthodox Patriarchate of Antioch
- Greek Orthodox Archdiocese of Thyateira and Great Britain
- Assembly of Canonical Orthodox Bishops of Great Britain and Ireland
