= St. Zlata Meglenska's Church, Zagreb =

St. Zlata Meglenska's Church
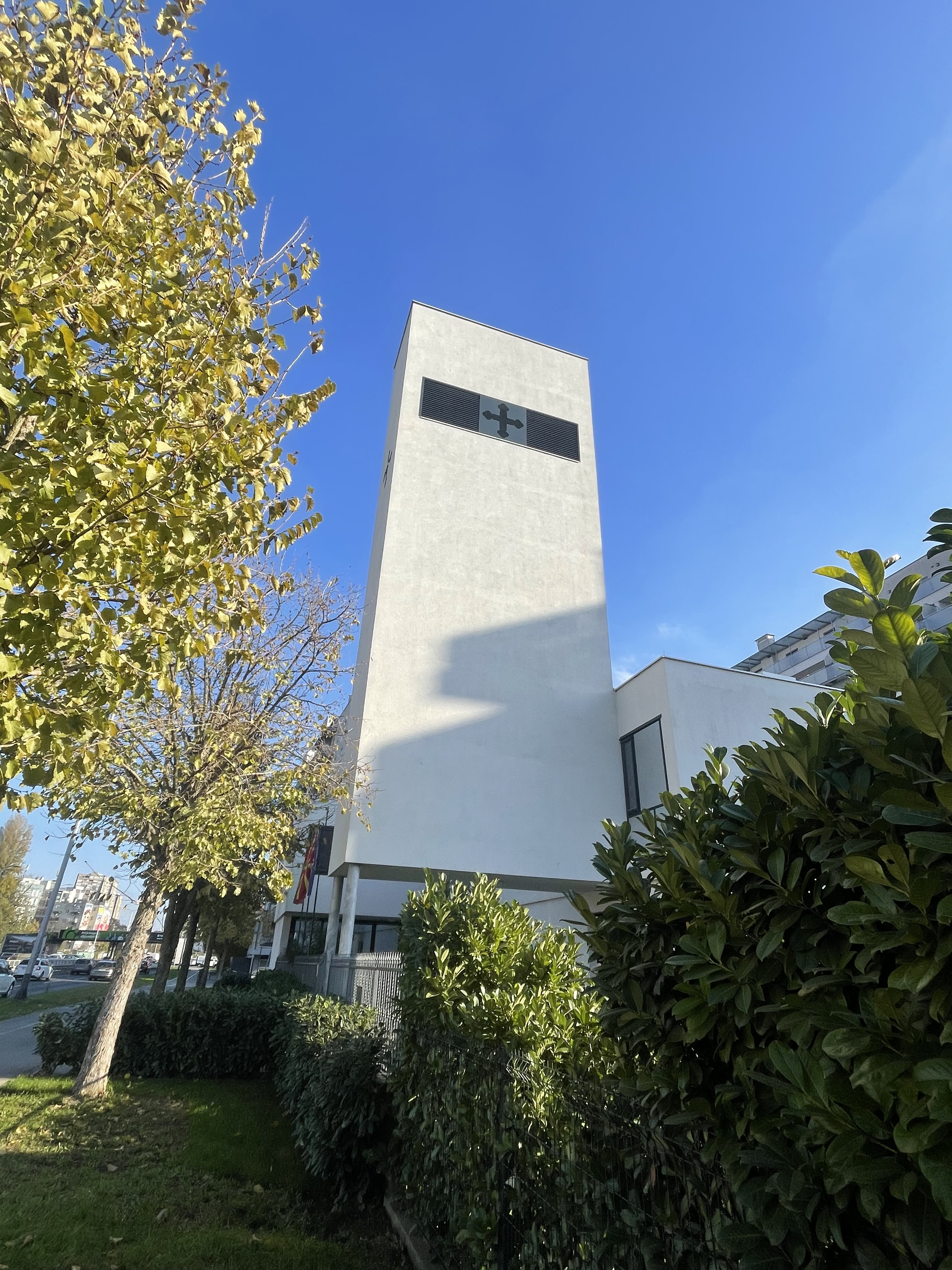
- St. Zlata Meglenska's Church, 2024
- St. Zlata Meglenska's Church
- 45°47′38″N 15°57′17″E
- Location: Zagreb
- Country: Croatia
- Denomination: Macedonian Orthodox Church

History
- Status: Church
- Dedication: St. Zlata Meglenska
- Consecrated: 21 May 2023

Architecture
- Functional status: Active
- Architect(s): Zoran Boševski, Boris Fiolić, Željko Golubić
- Years built: 2014-2023

Administration
- Archdiocese: Macedonian Orthodox Diocese of Europe

The St. Zlata Meglenska's Church (Macedonian: Црква „Св. Злата Мегленска“; Croatian: Crkva sv. Zlate Meglenske) is an Eastern Orthodox church in Zagreb, Croatia. The church is the only Macedonian Orthodox church in Croatia. It was built between 2014 and 2023.

== History ==
The Macedonian Orthodox Church began its activities in Zagreb in 1993, during the Croatian War of Independence, and the local Roman Catholic church temporarily provided the Church of Saint Rok for use in 1995 until a new building could be constructed.

In 2003, the Croatian government and the Macedonian Orthodox Church signed a cooperation agreement, leading to the dispatch of a priest from Macedonia to serve the local community. Land for the new building was purchased in 2008, which was also the year a competition was organized to design the new structure.

The new church building was consecrated on 21 May 2023 both by Stefan of Ohrid and Macedonia and Serbian Patriarch Porfirije. This joint consecration happened in the context of ending of the schism between Serbian Orthodox Church and Macedonian Orthodox Church which lasted between 1967 and 2022. The event was attended by the Prime Minister of Croatia Andrej Plenković who was awarded the highest ecclesiastical honour bestowed by the Macedonian Orthodox Church.

== See also ==
- Cathedral of the Transfiguration of the Lord, Zagreb
- Macedonians of Croatia
