= Antiochian Orthodox Archdiocese of Australia, New Zealand and the Philippines =

Asia-pacific religious organisation

Archdiocese of Antiochian Orthodox Archdiocese of Australia, New Zealand and the Philippines

Orthodox

Location
- Territory: Australia; New Zealand; Philippines
- Headquarters: Archiepiscopal: Sydney; Patriarchal: Damascus, Syria

Statistics
- Members: 37,500

Information
- Denomination: Eastern Orthodox
- Rite: Byzantine Rite
- Language: English, Greek, Arabic, Filipino

Current leadership
- Parent church: Greek Orthodox Patriarchate of Antioch
- Governance: Episcopal polity
- Patriarch: John X of Antioch
- Metropolitan: Metropolitan Basilios (Kodseie)

Website
- www.antiochian.org.au

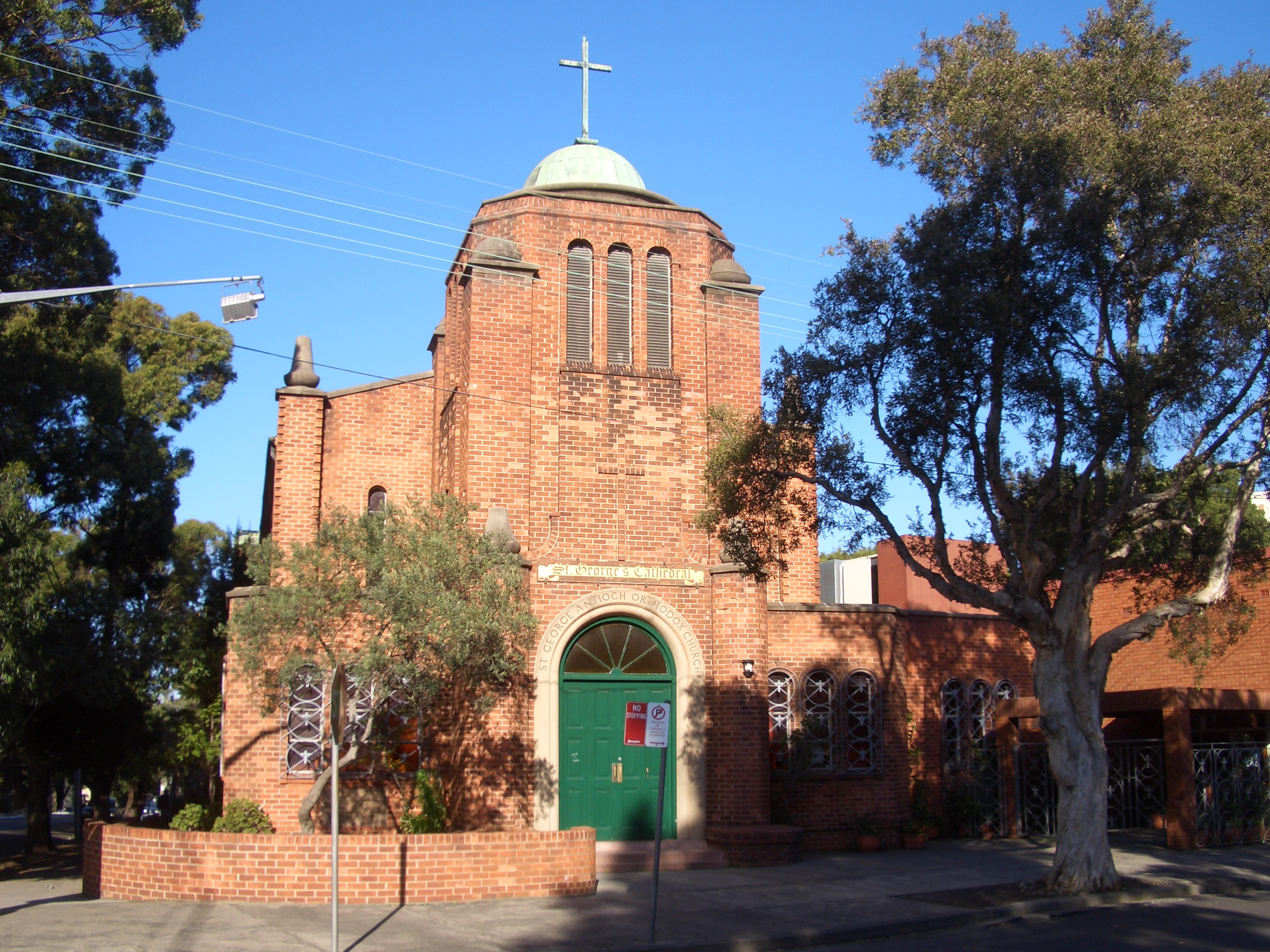
St George Antiochian Orthodox Cathedral, Redfern, New South Wales.

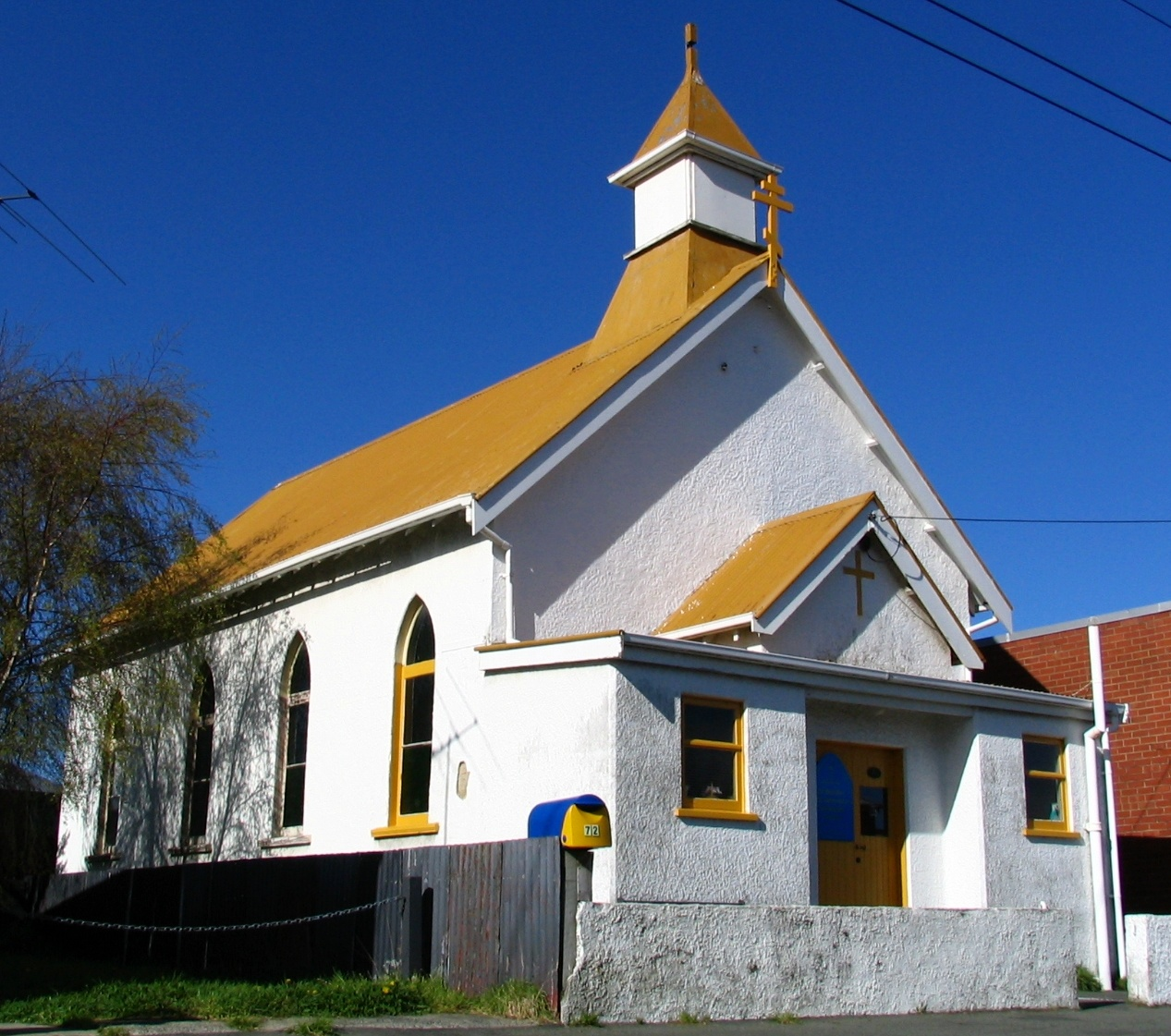
St Michael's Antiochian Orthodox Church, Dunedin, New Zealand.

The Antiochian Orthodox Archdiocese of Australia, New Zealand and the Philippines (Arabic: أبرشية أستراليا، نيوزيلندا والفيلبين للأرثوذكس الأنطاكيين) is an archdiocese of the Antiochian Orthodox Church, with headquarters in Sydney, Australia. Its current primate is Basilios (Kodseie), Metropolitan of Australia, New Zealand and the Philippines. The archdiocese has approximately 37,500 members. The archdiocese and the parishes are under the jurisdiction of the Patriarchate of Antioch, based in Damascus, Syria.

== History ==
The earliest recorded presence of Antiochian Orthodox Christians in Australia dates to around 1870, when lay immigrants are believed to have arrived in Sydney. The first Antiochian Orthodox priest in Australia, Nicholas Shehadie, was appointed in 1913 as a patriarchal exarch. A second parish was established in Melbourne in 1937.

The archdiocese was formally established in 1970, with Bishop Gibran Rimlawi as its head. A second church in Sydney was opened in Punchbowl in 1974. The archdiocese subsequently expanded to include parishes in Sydney, Melbourne, Adelaide, Brisbane, and Wollongong, as well as communities in New Zealand.

== Organization ==
The archdiocese is a single ecclesiastical jurisdiction covering multiple countries. The Archbishop resides in Australia, while New Zealand is administered as a deanery. Smaller communities also exist in other parts of the Pacific region.

The archdiocese includes 25 parishes and missions in Australia and 8 parishes and missions in the New Zealand deanery. Membership is estimated at 37,500 faithful.

The archdiocese formerly maintained a female monastery dedicated to Saint Anna in Preston, Victoria, which has since closed. It also established the Melbourne Institute of Orthodox Christian Studies, a multi-jurisdictional educational institution.

The archdiocese and the Antiochian Orthodox Christian Mission in the Philippines have participated in regional Orthodox cooperation initiatives in the Asia-Pacific region.

The Ecumenical Patriarchate of Constantinople, through the Metropolis of Hong Kong and Southeast Asia, does not recognize the Antiochian jurisdiction in the Philippines, which it considers part of its canonical territory.

== Primates in Australia and New Zealand ==
- Bishop Gibran (Ramlawey) (1969–1999)
- Metropolitan Archbishop Paul (Saliba) (1999–2017)
- Metropolitan Archbishop Basilios (Kodseie) (2017–present)

== See also ==
- Antiochian Orthodox Christian Mission in the Philippines
- Assembly of Canonical Orthodox Bishops of Australia, New Zealand, and Oceania
