= Mark Arndt =

German archbishop (born 1941)

Michael Arndt
- Metropolitan of Berlin and Germany
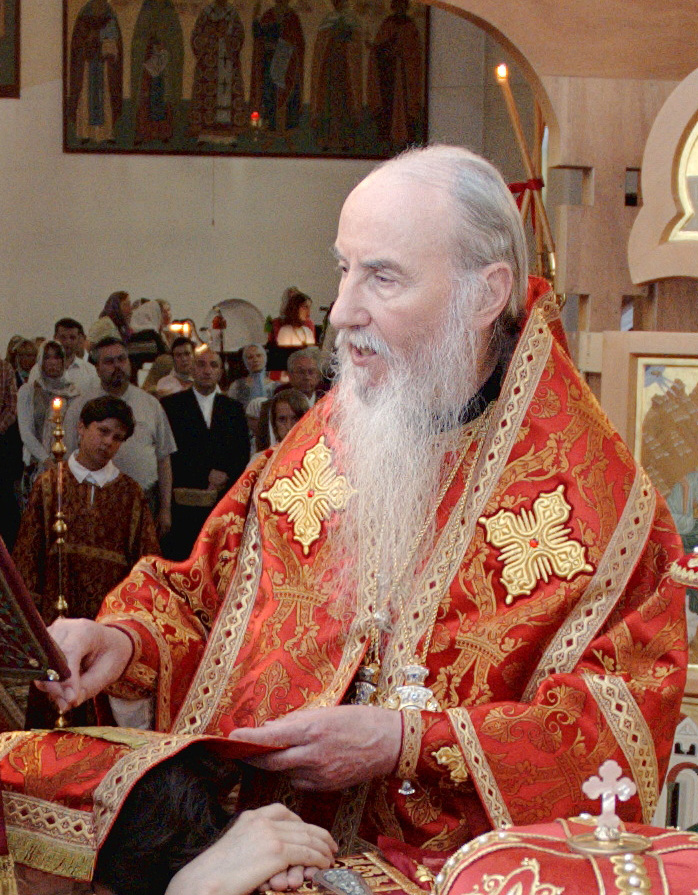
- Metropolitan Mark in 2010
- Church: Russian Orthodox Church (ROCOR)
- Diocese: Berlin and Germany
- Installed: 30 November 1980

Orders
- Ordination: 1975
- Consecration: 1980 by Paul (Pavlov)

Personal details
- Born: Michael Arndt; 29 January 1941 (age 85) Frankfurt am Main, West Germany

Metropolitan Mark (secular name: Michael Arndt; born 29 January 1941) is the Metropolitan of Berlin and Germany of the Russian Orthodox Church Outside Russia, Vice President of the global synod of the bishops of the Russian Orthodox Church Outside Russia and Overseer of the Russian Orthodox Ecclesiastical Mission in Jerusalem.

== Life ==
As a child, Michael attended the schools in Frankfurt am Main, graduating in 1960. After finishing school he volunteered for military service in West Germany for one year. Later he was recalled up to serve several times, rising to the rank of First lieutenant. In 1962, he entered Frankfurt University, then later transferred to the University of Heidelberg. His academic program included studies in English and Slavic languages and literature.

In the course of his study of Slavistics, he became a specialist in a number of Slavic languages and literature, including Russian, Serbo-Croatian, Slovak, Czech and Macedonian. He completed his PhD with the doctoral thesis "Biographical Literature of the Duchy of Tver in the 14th and 15th Centuries".

During his studies of Russian, he became acquainted with the Russian émigré community in Frankfurt. While studying under Professor Dmitri Chizhevsky at the University of Heidelberg, he visited the ROCOR Church of St. Alexander Nevsky in Mannheim.

In 1964, he converted to Orthodox Christianity and became a reader. He later made trips to Mount Athos where he developed friendships with many of the elders, including two Hieroschemamonks named Seraphim and Abel.

He continued his theological studies in 1973 in Belgrade, Yugoslavia graduating with a degree in theology in 1979. In Belgrade, Michael became part of a tightly-knit group of Serbia elder's students through an archimandrite, St. Justin (Popović): hieromonks Amfilohije Radović, Atanasije (Jevtić), Artemije (Radosavljević) and Irinej (Bulović), later bishops of the Serbian Orthodox Church. In 1975, Michael chose a monastic life and was tonsured a monk with the name Mark by Bishop Paul (Pavlov) of Stuttgart.

He was ordained a deacon in the summer of 1975, and a hieromonk three days later by Bishop Paul. Hieromonk Mark was appointed Deputy Rector of the Russian church in Wiesbaden, Germany. In 1976, he was elevated to the rank of archimandrite.

On 30 November 1980 he was consecrated bishop, and was installed as the (ROCOR) Bishop of Munich and Southern Germany succeeding bishop Paul (Pavlov).

In 1982, he was assigned as Bishop of Berlin and All Germany.

In April 1986 he was appointed Ruling Bishop of the Diocese of Great Britain and Ireland and Rector of St. Alexander Nevsky Church in Copenhagen.

In 1990, he was elevated to the rank of Archbishop.

In 1997, he was also appointed Overseer of the Russian Ecclesiastical Mission in Jerusalem.

Archbishop Mark has been one of the most ardent supporters of Church unity between ROCOR and the Moscow Patriarchate, and worked tirelessly to see this goal achieved. From 1993 to 1997, he headed the dialog between the German-based dioceses of the Russian Orthodox Church Outside of Russia and the Moscow Patriarchate in the reunited Germany. Since 2000, he has been the President of the Committee on the Unity of the Russian Church, and since 2003, the President of the Commission on talks with the Moscow Patriarchate. This was a large part of the impetus which brought about the reunification of the ROCOR and Moscow Patriarchal churches, which finally took place in 2006.

From 7–12 June 2009 he was a participant of the Pan-Orthodox Pre-Council Conference IV of the Russian Orthodox Church.

Since 27 July 2009 he is Member of the Inter-Council Presence of the Russian Orthodox Church.

On 8 December 2016 the Synod of ROCOR heard the report by Archbishop Mark and then accepted his resignation from the Diocese of Great Britain.

On 10 December 2019, the feast day of the Kursk-Root Icon of the Mother of God, Archbishop Mark was made a Metropolitan by the Holy Synod of ROCOR in recognition of his 40 years of Episcopal service to the Church. Although largely symbolic, this is the first instance of multiple active Metropolitan Bishops in ROCOR, apart from those who were previously made Metropolitans prior to the inception of ROCOR and retired Metropolitans.

Eastern Orthodox Church titles
Preceded by Paul (Pavlov)	Bishop of Munich and Southern Germany (ROCOR); 1980–1982	Succeeded by Agapit (Gorachek)
Preceded by Philotheus (Narko)	Bishop of Berlin, Germany and of Great Britain (ROCOR); 1982–present	Incumbent
