= Greek Orthodox Metropolis of Ireland =

Orthodox Christian diocese

Holy Orthodox Metropolis of Ireland

Orthodox

Location
- Country: Republic of Ireland and Northern Ireland
- Headquarters: Dublin

Statistics
- Parishes: 2
- Churches: 2

Information
- Denomination: Eastern Orthodox
- Rite: Byzantine Rite
- Established: 2024
- Cathedral: Annunciation of the Mother of God
- Language: Greek and English

Current leadership
- Parent church: Ecumenical Patriarchate of Constantinople
- Governance: Episcopal
- Patriarch: Bartholomew I of Constantinople
- Metropolitan: Iakovos Antonopoulos

The Sacred Metropolis of Ireland or Holy Orthodox Metropolis of Ireland and Exarchy of Celtic Sea (Greek: Ιερά Μητρόπολις Ιρλανδίας και Εξαρχία Κελτικής Θαλάσσης) is a diocese of the Ecumenical Patriarchate of Constantinople, established in 2024.

The Holy Orthodox Metropolis of Ireland was established by decision of the Holy Synod of the Ecumenical Patriarchate of Constantinople on March 22, 2024, with the separation of the territories of Ireland from the Greek Orthodox Archdiocese of Thyateira and Great Britain. Its jurisdiction covers those Orthodox Christians living in the Republic of Ireland and Northern Ireland.

The first Metropolitan bishop was elected on the same day, Auxiliary Bishop Iakovos of Zenoupolis.

Metropolitan Iakovos of Ireland was enthroned by Archbishop Nikitas of Thyateira and Great Britain, on Saturday, 18 May 2024. The ceremony took place at the Greek Orthodox Church of the Annunciation of the Mother of God in Dublin.

== Communities ==
- Dublin - Greek Orthodox Church of the Annunciation of the Mother of God
- Cork - Greek Orthodox Chapel of St Nicholas
