= Chrysi, Pella =

Chrysi Χρυσή
- Community
- Location within Greece
- Coordinates: 40°56′42″N 22°6′59″E
- Country: Greece
- Geographic region: Macedonia
- Administrative region: Central Macedonia
- Regional unit: Pella
- Municipality: Almopia
- Municipal unit: Exaplatanos

Population (2021)
  - Community: 256
- Time zone: UTC+2 (EET)
  - Summer (DST): UTC+3 (EEST)

Chrysi (Greek: Χρυσή, before 1926: Ζλάτινα – Zlatina) is a village in Pella regional unit, Macedonia, Greece.

Chrysi had 1045 inhabitants in 1981. In fieldwork done by anthropologist Riki Van Boeschoten in late 1993, Chrysi was populated by a Greek population descended from Anatolian Greek refugees who arrived during the Greek–Turkish population exchange, and Slavophones. The Macedonian language was spoken in the village by people over 30 in public and private settings. Children understood the language, but mostly did not use it. Turkish was spoken by people over 60, mainly in private.
