= Pregny-Chambésy =

- Municipality
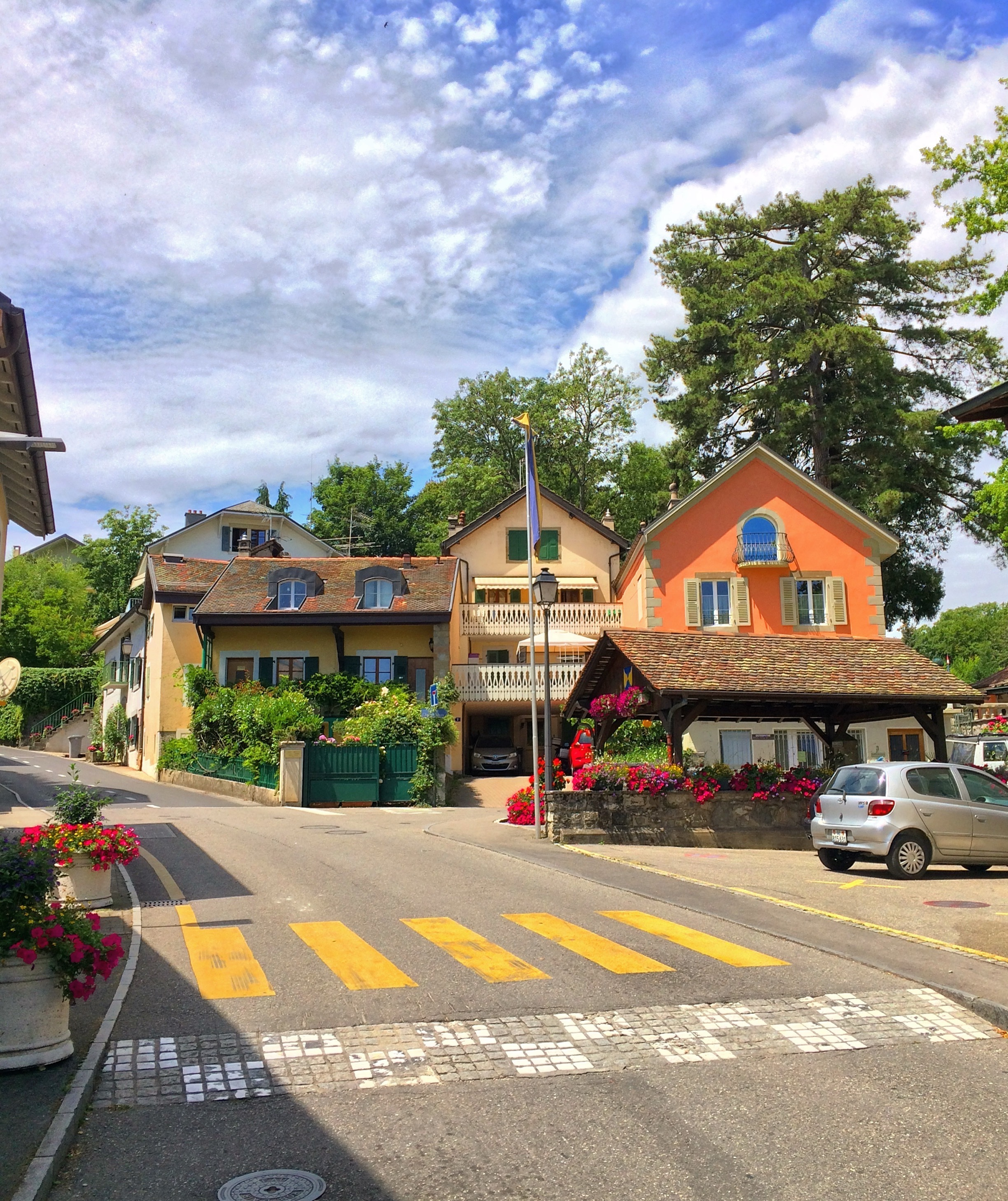

- Flag Coat of arms
- Location of Pregny-Chambésy
- Location within Switzerland Location within Canton of Geneva
- Coordinates: 46°15′N 06°08′E
- Country: Switzerland
- Canton: Geneva
- District: n.a.

Government
  - Mayor: Maire; Philippe Pasche The Centre (political party)

Area
  - Total: 3.24 km^{2} (1.25 sq mi)
- Elevation: 449 m (1,473 ft)

Population (December 2020)
  - Total: 3,803
  - Density: 1,170/km^{2} (3,040/sq mi)
- Time zone: UTC+01:00 (CET)
  - Summer (DST): UTC+02:00 (CEST)
- Postal code: 1292
- SFOS number: 6634
- ISO 3166 code: CH-GE
- Surrounded by: Bellevue, Geneva (Genève), Grand-Saconnex
- Website: www.pregny-chambesy.ch

Pregny-Chambésy is a commune in the canton of Geneva in Switzerland. It is located directly north of the city of Geneva, on the south-western shore of Lake Geneva.

A number of foreign permanent missions are located in Pregny-Chambésy due to its proximity to most of Geneva's United Nations organizations and agencies as well as Geneva International Airport.

== History ==
Pregny is first mentioned in 1113 as Priniacum, and Chambésy in 1277 as Sambesie. The region of Pregny and Chambésy stayed under the County of Savoy and then Duchy of Savoy rule from 1353 until 1536, when it was conquered by Bern. It went back to Savoy in 1567, was conquered by the Republic of Geneva in 1590, and then by France in 1601. It finally joined the canton of Geneva in 1815 and thus the Swiss Confederacy.

== Geography ==
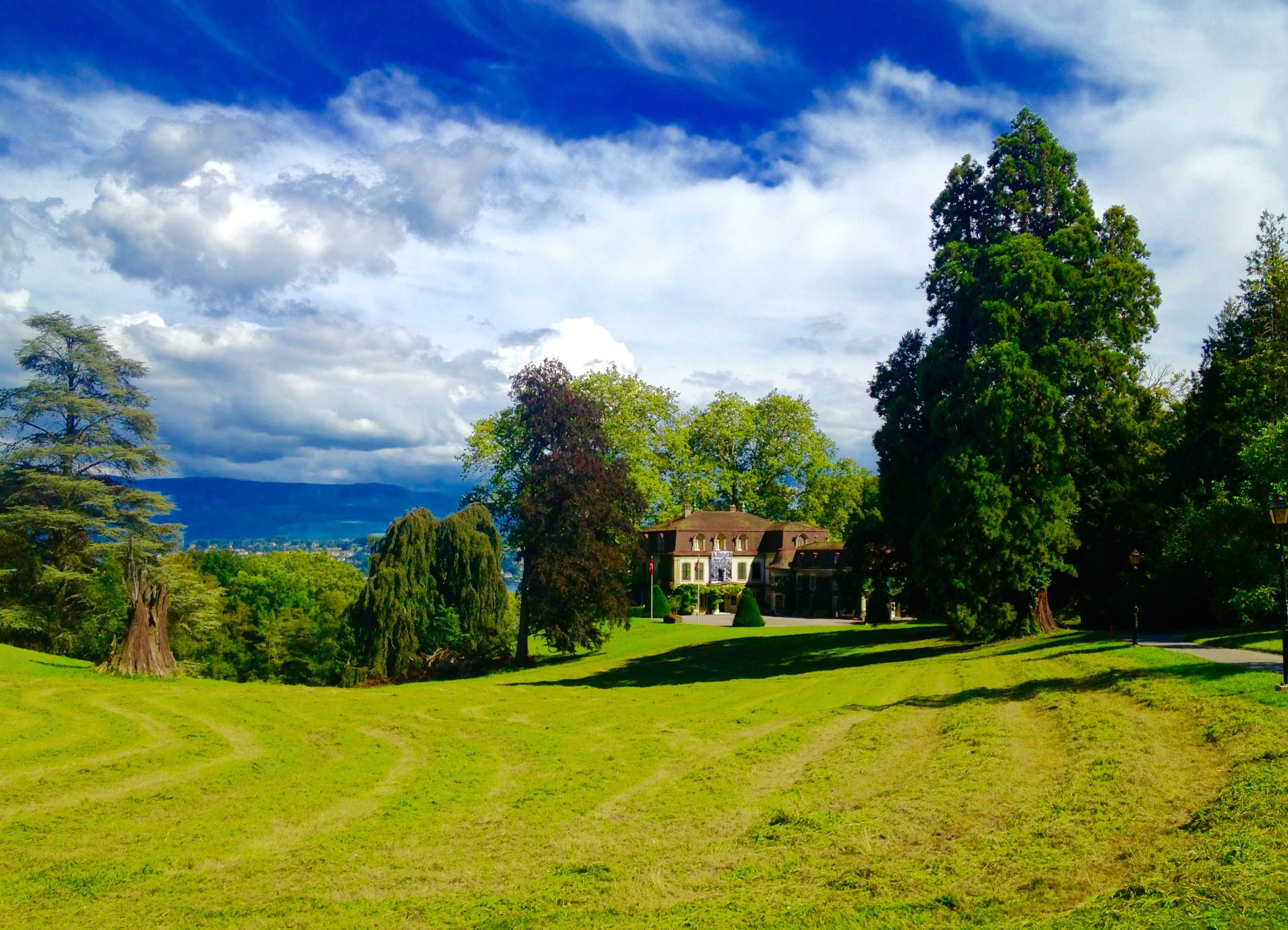
Chateau de penthes in Pregny-Chambésy

Pregny-Chambésy has an area, as of 2009, of 3.24 square kilometers (1.25 sq mi). Of this area, 0.5 km^{2} (0.19 sq mi) or 15.4% is used for agricultural purposes, while 0.43 km^{2} (0.17 sq mi) or 13.3% is forested. Of the rest of the land, 2.29 km^{2} (0.88 sq mi) or 70.7% is settled (buildings or roads), 0.03 km^{2} (7.4 acres) or 0.9% is either rivers or lakes.

Of the built up area, housing and buildings made up 53.4% and transportation infrastructure made up 9.6%. while parks, green belts and sports fields made up 6.8%. Out of the forested land, 8.6% of the total land area is heavily forested and 4.6% is covered with orchards or small clusters of trees. Of the agricultural land, 6.2% is used for growing crops and 5.9% is pastures, while 3.4% is used for orchards or vine crops. All the water in the municipality is in lakes.

The municipality is located 3 km (1.9 mi) from Geneva on the right shore of Lake Geneva. It originally consisted of the village of Pregny and the hamlets of Chambésy-Dessus and Chembésy-Dessous as well as the settlement of Roilbot. Until 1960 it was known as Pregny.

== Demographics ==
Pregny-Chambésy has a population (as of December 2020) of 3,803. As of 2008, 49.2% of the population are resident foreign nationals. Over the last 10 years (1999–2009 ) the population has changed at a rate of 21.2%. It has changed at a rate of 26.1% due to migration and at a rate of -1.7% due to births and deaths.

Most of the population (as of 2000) speaks French (2,081 or 69.2%), with English being second most common (377 or 12.5%) and German being third (158 or 5.3%). There are 84 people who speak Italian.

As of 2008, the gender distribution of the population was 49.3% male and 50.7% female. The population was made up of 828 Swiss men (22.8% of the population) and 963 (26.5%) non-Swiss men. There were 930 Swiss women (25.6%) and 914 (25.1%) non-Swiss women. Of the population in the municipality 396 or about 13.2% were born in Pregny-Chambésy and lived there in 2000. There were 598 or 19.9% who were born in the same canton, while 402 or 13.4% were born somewhere else in Switzerland, and 1,157 or 38.5% were born outside of Switzerland.

In 2008 there were 15 live births to Swiss citizens and 20 births to non-Swiss citizens, and in same time span there were 27 deaths of Swiss citizens and 9 non-Swiss citizen deaths. Ignoring immigration and emigration, the population of Swiss citizens decreased by 12 while the foreign population increased by 11. There were 8 Swiss men and 2 Swiss women who emigrated from Switzerland. At the same time, there were 79 non-Swiss men and 61 non-Swiss women who immigrated from another country to Switzerland. The total Swiss population change in 2008 (from all sources, including moves across municipal borders) was a decrease of 24 and the non-Swiss population increased by 104 people. This represents a population growth rate of 2.3%.

The age distribution of the population (as of 2000) is children and teenagers (0–19 years old) make up 23.5% of the population, while adults (20–64 years old) make up 61.2% and seniors (over 64 years old) make up 15.3%.

As of 2000, there were 1,232 people who were single and never married in the municipality. There were 1,442 married individuals, 182 widows or widowers and 153 individuals who are divorced.

As of 2000, there were 1,060 private households in the municipality, and an average of 2.4 persons per household. There were 331 households that consist of only one person and 90 households with five or more people. Out of a total of 1,099 households that answered this question, 30.1% were households made up of just one person and there were 9 adults who lived with their parents. Of the rest of the households, there are 250 married couples without children, 375 married couples with children There were 78 single parents with a child or children. There were 17 households that were made up of unrelated people and 39 households that were made up of some sort of institution or another collective housing.

In 2000 there were 564 single family homes (or 73.1% of the total) out of a total of 772 inhabited buildings. There were 120 multi-family buildings (15.5%), along with 56 multi-purpose buildings that were mostly used for housing (7.3%) and 32 other use buildings (commercial or industrial) that also had some housing (4.1%). Of the single family homes 72 were built before 1919, while 56 were built between 1990 and 2000. The greatest number of single family homes (141) were built between 1981 and 1990. The most multi-family homes (36) were built between 1961 and 1970 and the next most (25) were built before 1919. There were 7 multi-family houses built between 1996 and 2000.

In 2000 there were 1,146 apartments in the municipality. The most common apartment size was 3 rooms of which there were 243. There were 63 single room apartments and 516 apartments with five or more rooms. Of these apartments, a total of 1,006 apartments (87.8% of the total) were permanently occupied, while 117 apartments (10.2%) were seasonally occupied and 23 apartments (2.0%) were empty. As of 2009, the construction rate of new housing units was 2.7 new units per 1000 residents. The vacancy rate for the municipality, in 2010, was 0.58%.

The historical population is given in the following chart:

== Heritage sites of national significance ==
The Campagne Du Reposoir, the Rothschild Castle and outbuildings, the Museum des Suisses dans le monde, the Organisation mondiale de la santé (OMS) Archives and the Serres de Rothschild are listed as Swiss heritage site of national significance.

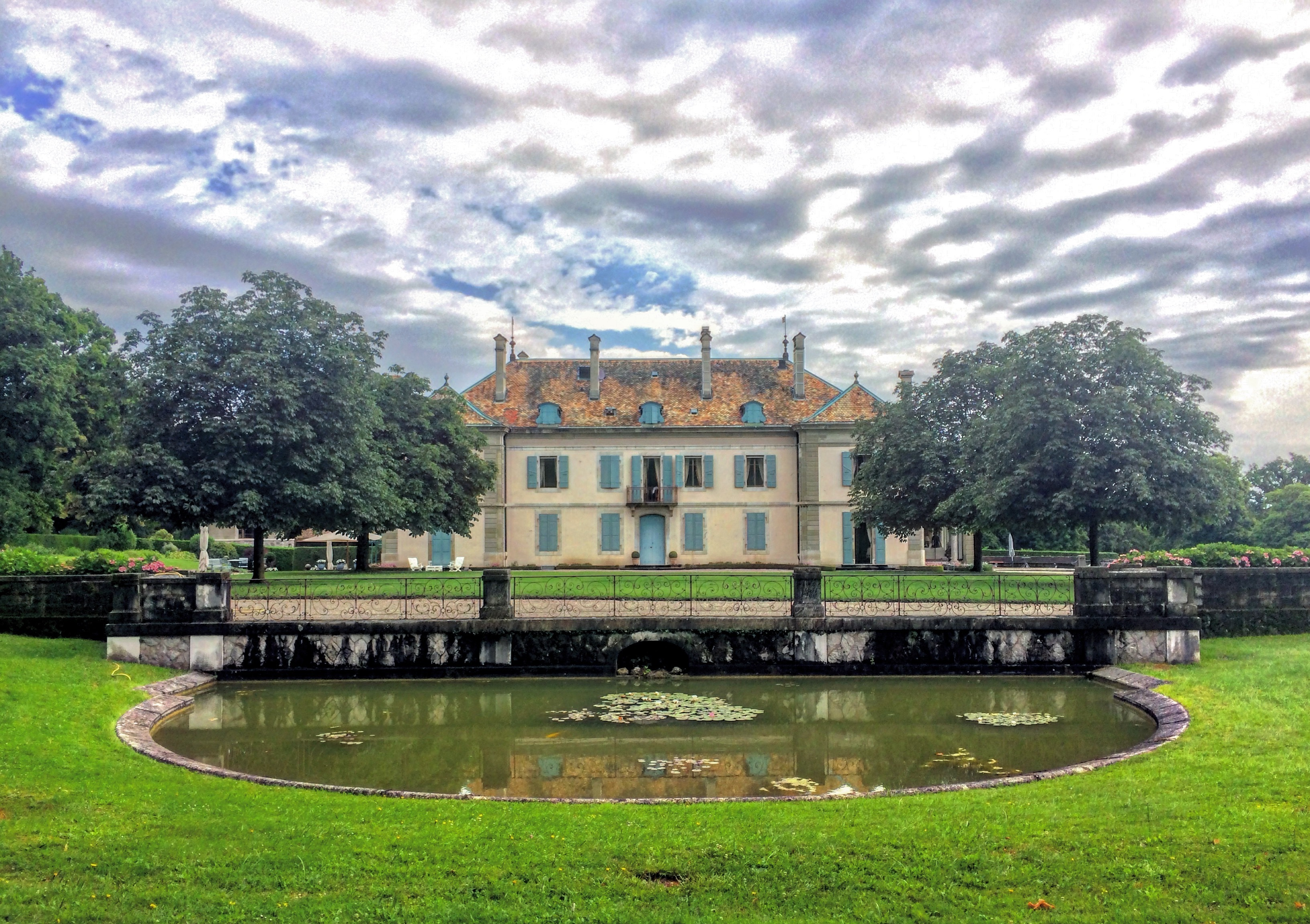
Campagne Du Reposoir

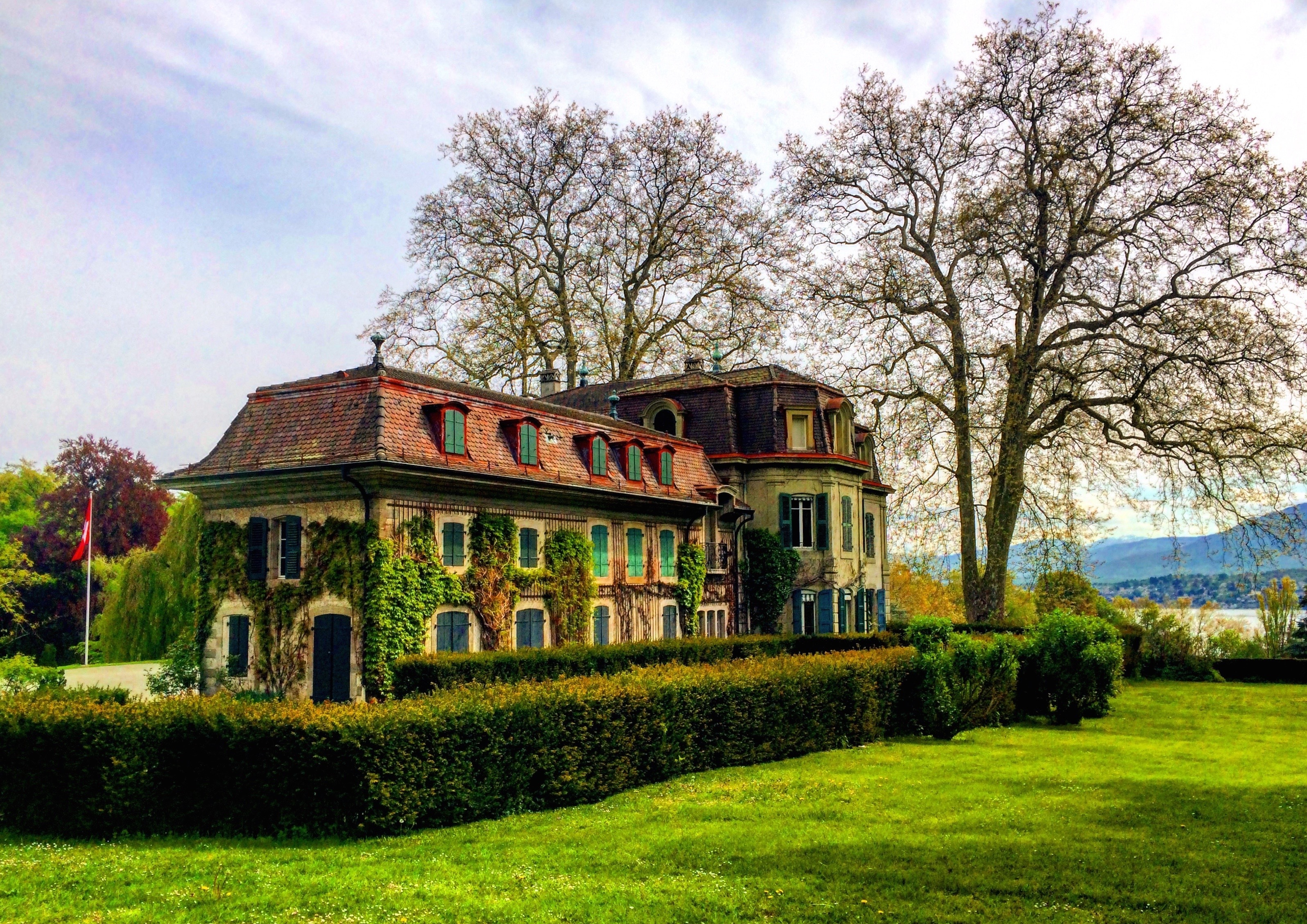
Museum of the Swiss Abroad (Musée des Suisses dans le monde).

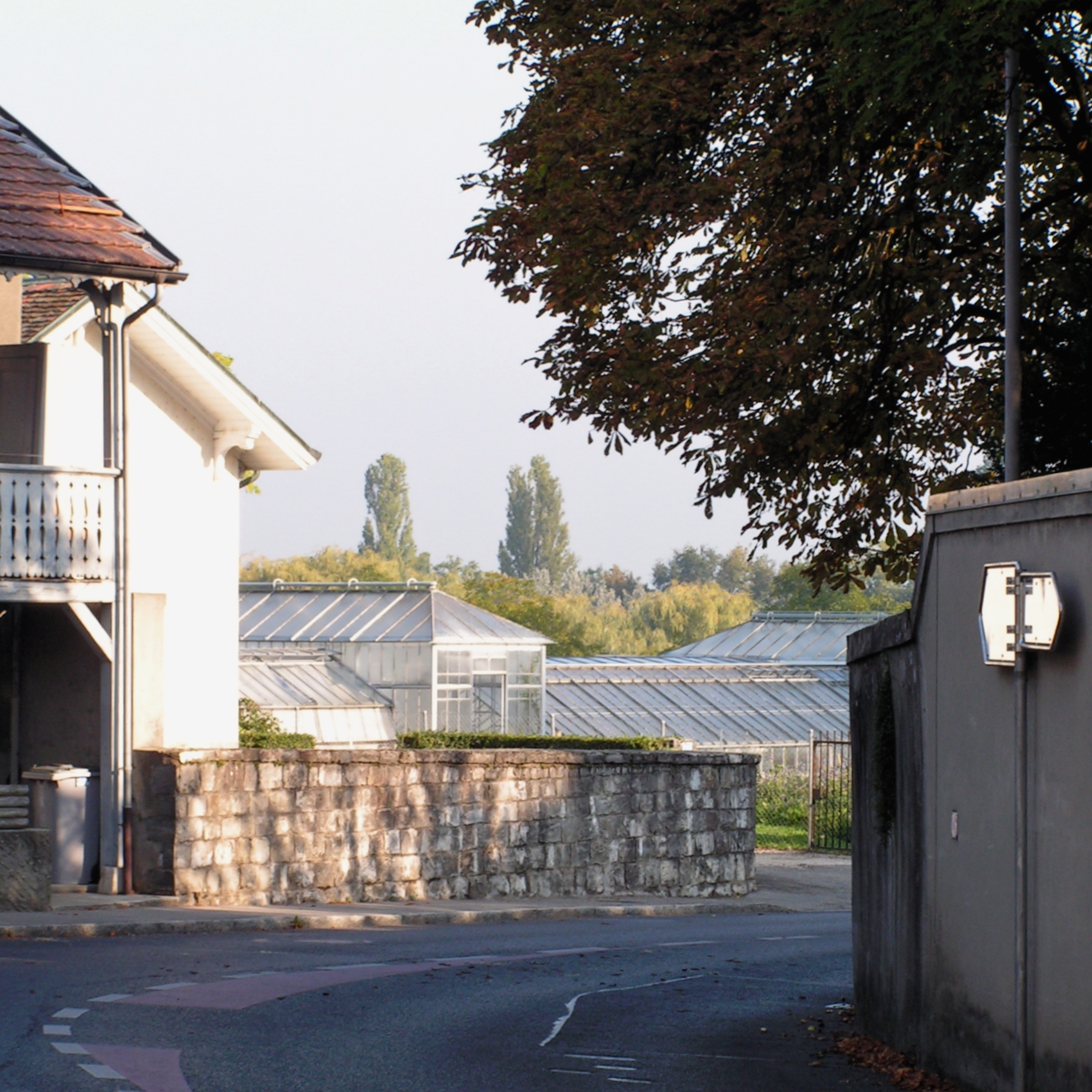
Serres of Pregny (Geneva Botanical Garden).

== Politics ==
In the 2009 Grand Conseil election, there were a total of 1,413 registered voters of which 640 (45.3%) voted. The most popular party in the municipality for this election was the Libéral with 26.8% of the ballots. In the canton-wide election they received the highest proportion of votes. The second most popular party was the Les Radicaux (with 14.5%), they were sixth in the canton-wide election, while the third most popular party was the Les Verts (with 13.1%), they were second in the canton-wide election.

For the 2009 Conseil d'Etat election, there were a total of 1,410 registered voters of which 728 (51.6%) voted.

In 2011, all the municipalities held local elections, and in Pregny-Chambésy there were 19 spots open on the municipal council (legislature) and 3 on the Administrative council (executive). There were a total of 1,808 registered voters of which 893 (49.4%) voted. Out of the 893 votes, there were 3 blank votes, 8 null or unreadable votes and 103 votes with a name that was not on the list.

In the 2011 federal election, the most popular party was the Les Libéraux-Radicaux which received 34.4% of the vote. A total of 673 votes were cast, and the voter turnout was 47.4%.

== Economy ==
As of 2010, Pregny-Chambésy had an unemployment rate of 3.6%. As of 2008, there were people employed in the primary economic sector and about businesses involved in this sector. 52 people were employed in the secondary sector and there were 9 businesses in this sector. 659 people were employed in the tertiary sector, with 91 businesses in this sector. There were 1,412 residents of the municipality who were employed in some capacity, of which females made up 45.7% of the workforce.

In 2008 the total number of full-time equivalent jobs was 606. The number of jobs in the primary sector was, all of which were in agriculture. The number of jobs in the secondary sector was 51 of which 11 or (21.6%) were in manufacturing and 40 (78.4%) were in construction. The number of jobs in the tertiary sector was 555. In the tertiary sector; 26 or 4.7% were in wholesale or retail sales or the repair of motor vehicles, 18 or 3.2% were in the movement and storage of goods, 65 or 11.7% were in a hotel or restaurant, 27 or 4.9% were in the information industry, 70 or 12.6% were the insurance or financial industry, 64 or 11.5% were technical professionals or scientists, 57 or 10.3% were in education and 136 or 24.5% were in health care.

In 2000, there were 1,362 workers who commuted into the municipality and 1,117 workers who commuted away. The municipality is a net importer of workers, with about 1.2 workers entering the municipality for every one leaving. About 4.6% of the workforce coming into Pregny-Chambésy are coming from outside Switzerland, while 0.1% of the locals commute out of Switzerland for work. Of the working population, 17.6% used public transportation to get to work, and 61.7% used a private car.

== Religion ==
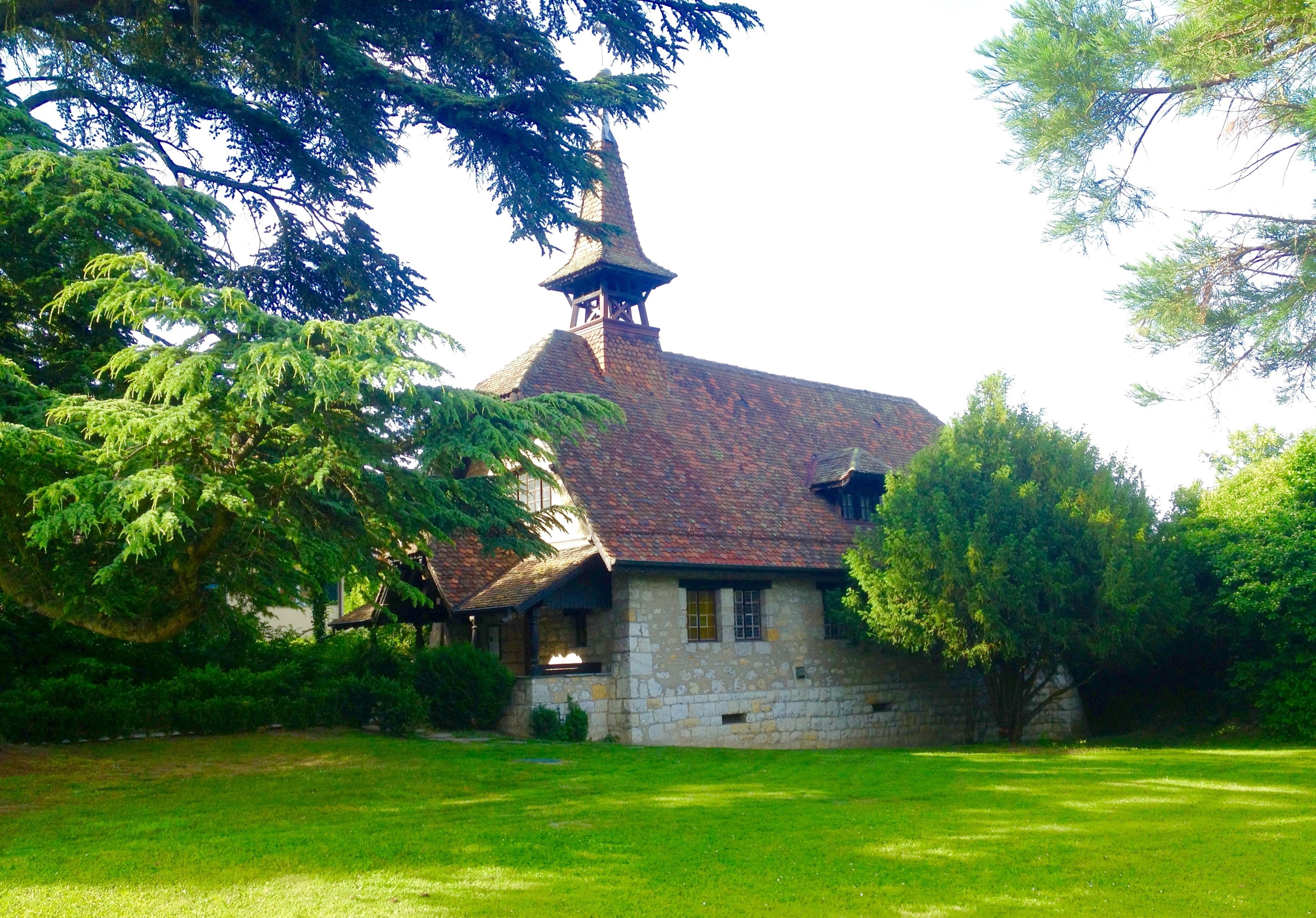
The Protestant Chapel "des Cornillons" of Pregny-Chambésy.

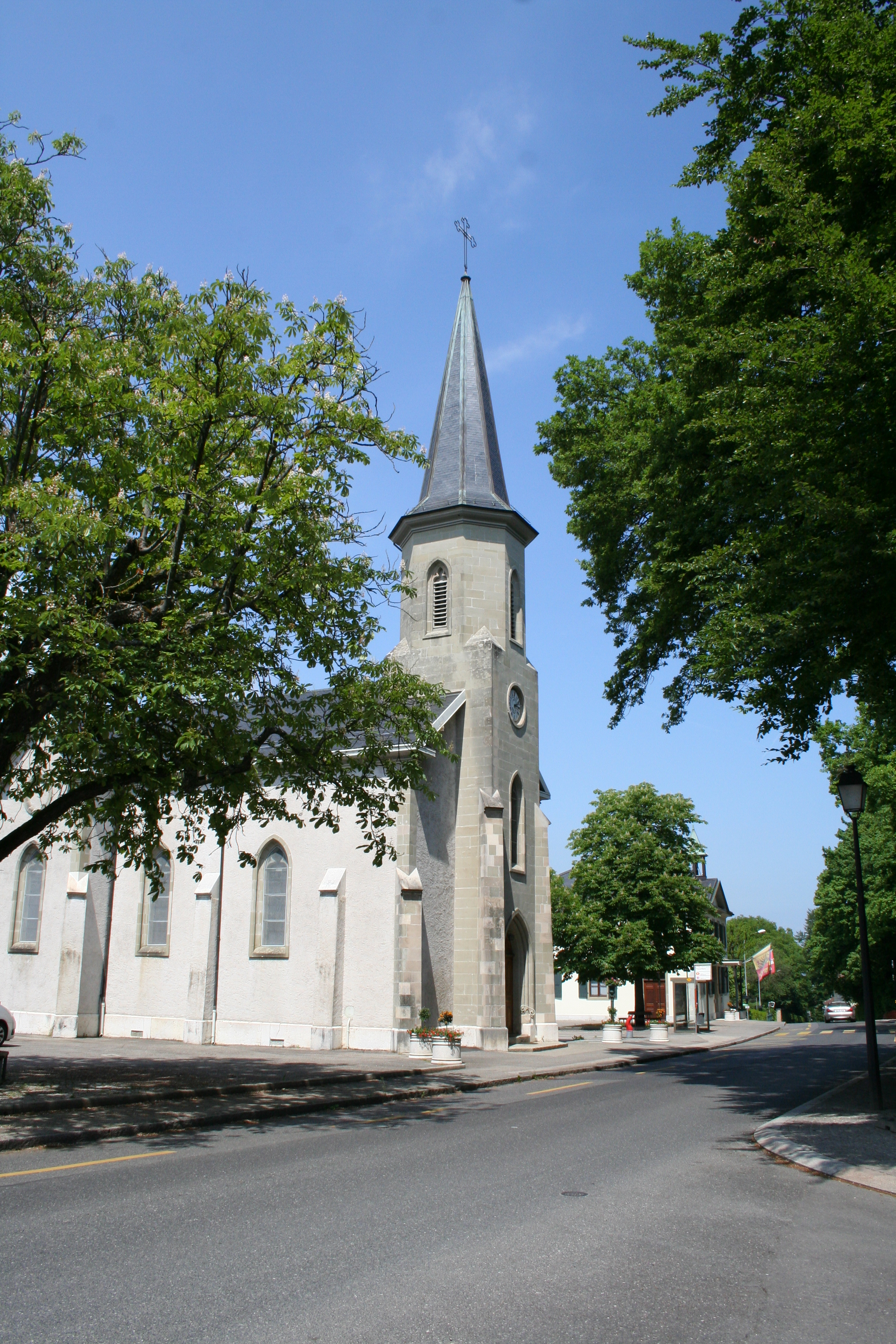
The Catholic Church or Pregny-Chambésy.

From the 2000 census, 945 or 31.4% were Roman Catholic, while 651 or 21.6% belonged to the Swiss Reformed Church. Of the rest of the population, there were 91 members of an Orthodox church (or about 3.02% of the population), and there were 101 individuals (or about 3.36% of the population) who belonged to another Christian church. There were 19 individuals (or about 0.63% of the population) who were Jewish, and 68 (or about 2.26% of the population) who were Muslim. There were 9 individuals who were Buddhist, 8 individuals who were Hindu and 7 individuals who belonged to another church. 603 (or about 20.04% of the population) belonged to no church, are agnostic or atheist, and 507 individuals (or about 16.85% of the population) did not answer the question.

== Education ==
In Pregny-Chambésy about 667 or (22.2%) of the population have completed non-mandatory upper secondary education, and 816 or (27.1%) have completed additional higher education (either university or a Fachhochschule). Of the 816 who completed tertiary schooling, 30.1% were Swiss men, 24.4% were Swiss women, 25.5% were non-Swiss men and 20.0% were non-Swiss women.

During the 2009-2010 school year there were a total of 723 students in the Pregny-Chambésy school system. The education system in the Canton of Geneva allows young children to attend two years of non-obligatory Kindergarten. During that school year, there were 53 children who were in a pre-kindergarten class. The canton's school system provides two years of non-mandatory kindergarten and requires students to attend six years of primary school, with some of the children attending smaller, specialized classes. In Pregny-Chambésy there were 70 students in kindergarten or primary school and 11 students were in the special, smaller classes. The secondary school program consists of three lower, obligatory years of schooling, followed by three to five years of optional, advanced schools. There were 70 lower secondary students who attended school in Pregny-Chambésy. There were 120 upper secondary students from the municipality along with 18 students who were in a professional, non-university track program. An additional 244 students attended a private school.

As of 2000, there were 76 students in Pregny-Chambésy who came from another municipality, while 352 residents attended schools outside the municipality.

International School of Geneva has a campus in Pregny-Chambésy.
