= Feiz =

Feiz is a given name and surname. Notable people with the name include:

== Surname ==
- Afshin Feiz, British photographer
- Khodi Feiz (born 1963), Iranian industrial designer

== Given name ==
- Feiz Mohammad (born 1970), Australian preacher
