= Robert Couturier =

Robert Couturier may refer to:

- Robert Couturier (sculptor) (1905–2008), French sculptor
- Robert Couturier (architect) (born 1955), French architect and decorator
