= Couturier (disambiguation) =

A couturier is a person who creates original garments for clients. The word may also refer to:

- Couturier (surname)
- 5439 Couturier, an asteroid
