= Swinxs =

Screenless video game console

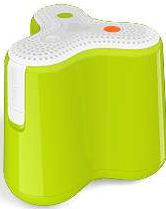

Swinxs is a portable game console for children between the ages of 4 and 12 years. The screen-free console was marketed as suitable for in-and-outdoor play and used RFID technology, audio, and light as a replacement for a monitor. Games for the console typically have users engage in physical or educational play by using a synthesized voice in combination with other sounds and a light.

== History ==
The console was designed by Khodi Feiz of Feiz Design before October 2, 2008. The system was developed by Dutch company Swinxs BV.

Swinxs was first introduced in 2008, starting in the Netherlands that spring. On October 2, 2008, the Swinxs launched in the United Kingdom. In the fourth quarter of 2008 Swinxs was also available in Spain, Portugal, and Italy. The Middle East and South America followed in early 2009. In August 2009 Swinxs was made available in the United States.

The system cost $150 US Dollars in 2009. In December 2010 the system cost 3,000 pesos in Mexico. The system was sold with 4 wristbands included.

The system and associated online services were discontinued in 2020.

== Console Features ==
Swinxs works via either a tangible user interface or a simple natural user interface. Because the system lacks a screen, output consists nearly exclusively of a simple light and speaker. The input is generated by three buttons (white, green, red), the RFID-reader, an accelerometer, a microphone and a USB port. The system supports between 1 and 10 players.

A USB port on the system makes it possible to connect to a PC or Macintosh. The USB port allowed new content to be downloaded and permits scores to be uploaded. The USB port is also used to recharge the internal battery, which when fully charged could run for approximately four hours.

=== SDK ===
The Software Development Kit (SDK) was made available to the general developer population and did not cost money to use, making it possible for users to create Swinxs games. The SDK and the game source codes could be downloaded from the Swinxs' website. In order to program and test new games the SDK is equipped with an emulator.

The games are written in the Swinxs Talk programming language, originating from the field of Industrial robots (programmable Logic controllers) and is based on the concept of finite-state machines.

=== Wristbands ===
The wristbands, known as XS tags, are equipped with RFID chips that communicate with the Swinxs console. The wristbands are used as a controller for the Swinxs. Other objects could also have RFID chips embedded in them to act as game controllers, such as a frisbee.

== Games ==
There are over 25 games ranging from active games like relay and duel to quizzes and ‘educational’ games. In October 2008, Swinxs launched card games. By linking Swinxs to a computer using a USB cable it is possible to upload gamescores to a personal homepage on the Swinxs website. This website is also used for downloading new games until the service was discontinued.

== Awards ==
- In November 2008 Swinxs won the third prize at the European Innovation Game Award.
- In June 2009 Swinxs won Game of the Year Award 2009. This award will be presented by the 'Creative Child Magazine’
- In Fall 2009 Swinxs won a Parents' Choice award.
- In August 2009 Swinxs won the National Parenting Publications Award.
- Also, in August 2009 just before their USA launch Swinxs was awarded the Seal of Approval by the National Parenting Center.
