= Couturier (surname) =

Couturier is the French-language occupational surname, literally meaning "seamster"/"couturier"

Notable people with the surname include:

- Catherine Couturier (born 1959), French politician
- Clément Couturier (born 1993), French footballer
- E. A. Couturier (1869–1950), American cornet player and inventor
- Paul Couturier (1881–1953), French priest
- Marie-Alain Couturier (1897–1954), French Dominican friar, designer of stained glass windows
- Louis-Charles Couturier (1817–1890), French Benedictine abbot, President of the French Congregation of Benedictines
- Robert Couturier (sculptor) (1905–2008), French sculptor
- Robert Couturier (architect) (born 1955), French architect and decorator
- Sean Couturier (born 1992), American-born Canadian ice hockey player
- Sylvain Couturier (born 1968), National Hockey League player, father of Sean
- Malik Couturier (born 1982), French football defender
