= École Camondo =

Coordinates: 48.8370°N 2.3311°E

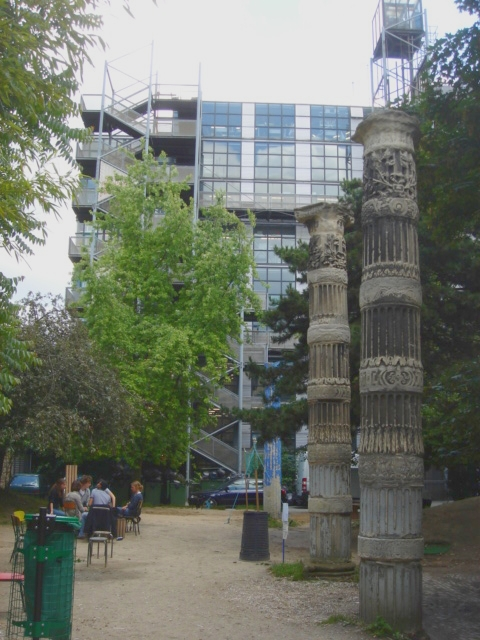
- École Camondo, viewed from the garden.

Location
- 266 Boulevard Raspail; Paris, France

Information
- Type: Private art school
- Established: 1944
- President: Hélène David-Weill
- Campus: Urban
- Website: ecolecamondo.fr

The École Camondo is a five-year private school of product design and interior architecture located in Paris, France, which was created in 1944 and was recognized by the French Ministry of Education in 1989. It is named after the Camondo family, a European family of Jewish financiers and philanthropists.

== Notable former students ==
- Patrick Bouchain, architect
- Robert Couturier, interior architect
- Najla El Zein, artist and designer
- Jacques Grange, interior designer
- Pierre Paulin, designer
- Patrick Rubin, architect
- Philippe Starck, designer
- Tran Nu Yen Khe, Vietnamese-born French actress
- Jean-Michel Wilmotte, architect, urban designer
