= Holy Trinity Cathedral and the Russian Orthodox Spiritual and Cultural Center =

Holy Trinity Cathedral
- Holy Trinity Cathedral and the Russian Orthodox Spiritual and Cultural Center
- Cathédrale de la Sainte-Trinité
- View from across the Seine.

- Location within Paris
- 48.8620°N 2.3011°E
- Location: Paris
- Country: France
- Denomination: Russian Orthodox Church
- Website: cathedrale-sainte-trinite.fr

Architecture
- Architect: Jean-Michel Wilmotte
- Architectural type: Cathedral
- Style: Art Moderne, New Classical
- Groundbreaking: 2013
- Completed: 2016

Administration
- Diocese: Diocese of Korsun

Holy Trinity Cathedral and The Russian Orthodox Spiritual and Cultural Center (French: Cathédrale de la Sainte-Trinité de Paris et Centre Spirituel et Culturel Orthodoxe Russe) is a complex that includes The Holy Trinity Cathedral of the Russian Orthodox Church; the Cultural Center found on Quai Branly, an educational complex in University Street, an administrative building in Rapp Street . The complex was opened on 19 March, 2016 by Paris Mayor Anne Hidalgo, the Russian Minister of Culture Vladimir Medinsky, and representatives of the Moscow Patriarchate.

== The Cathedral ==
The cathedral is the headquarters of the Russian Orthodox Diocese of Chersonesus, which covers the territory of France, Switzerland, Liechtenstein and Monaco. The diocese has been part of the Patriarchal Exarchate in Western Europe since 1982.

=== History ===
The cathedral was first proposed in 2007 by the Patriarch of Moscow, Alexis II, with the support of French President Nicolas Sarkozy and Russian President Vladimir Putin. In February 2010, the Russian government bought a site of 4,000 square metres (0.99 acres) close to the banks of the Seine and not far from the Eiffel Tower. The site had been occupied by the headquarters of Meteo France, which was moving to a new location. The government of Saudi Arabia had attempted to buy the same site for a large mosque, without success.

On October 15, 2010, Alexander Konstantinovich Orlov, the Russian Ambassador to France, announced a competition for the design of the cathedral, as part of a grander plan which included buildings for a Russian Orthodox Spiritual and Cultural Center. The competition was won by the Spanish architect Nunez Yanowsky. However, the Yanowsky design offended the Mayor of Paris, Bertrand Delanoe, who felt it was out of harmony with the historic architecture of the banks of the Seine, which in 1991 had been declared a UNESCO World Heritage Site. The project also received a negative review from the French Service Territorial de l'Architecture et du Patrimoine. Two months later Russia withdrew the proposed project.

After the election of a new French President, François Hollande in 2012, Putin put forward an alternate design by Jean-Michel Wilmotte which had come in second in the original competition. Wilmotte's plan was promptly accepted, a construction permit was given on 24 December, and construction began almost immediately.

The cross on the dome of the finished cathedral was blessed on March 19, 2016 by the Bishop of Cherneson. President Putin was originally planning to dedicate the finished cathedral, but, as the result of a conflict over Russia's Middle East policy in Syria, the French President withdrew his invitation to Putin at the last minute. The cathedral was inaugurated on April 12, 2016 by Kirill, the Patriarch of Moscow, and The Minister of Culture, Vladimir Medinski. It was formally dedicated to the "historic, cultural and spiritual relations between France and Russia". Putin made a well-publicised visit to Paris and the cathedral on May 29,2017.

== Affiliation ==
Holy Trinity is not affiliated with Alexander Nevsky Cathedral, Paris, the first Russian Orthodox Church in Paris. Founded in 1863, Alexander Nevsky Cathedral belongs to a group of orthodox churches of Russian tradition in western Europe that was independent from the Moscow Patriarchy until 2018.

== Setting ==
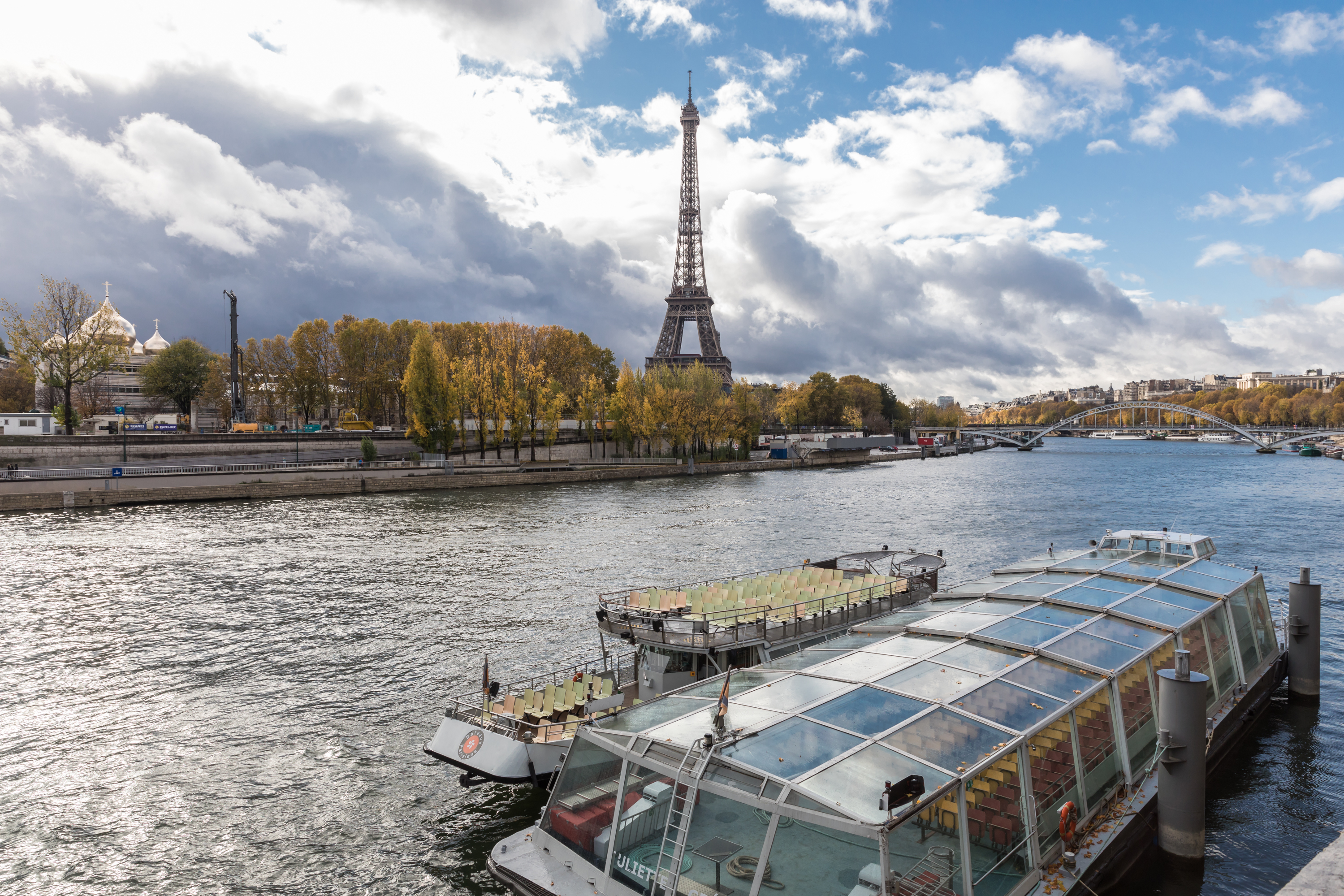
Cathedral and Cultural Center seen from the Seine (top left)

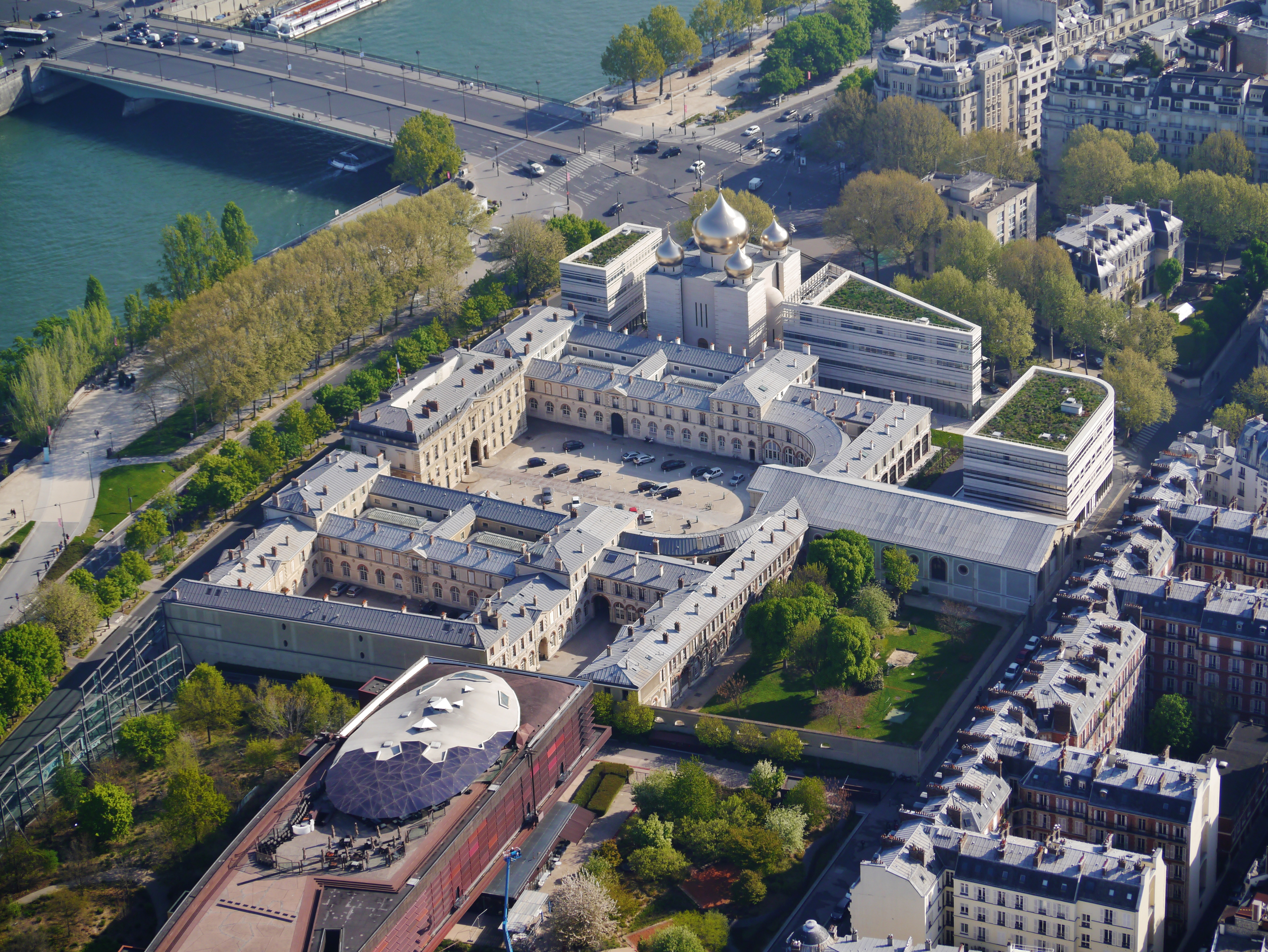
Cathedral and Center Buildings seen from the Air

The cathedral occupies 450 square meters. The other buildings on the site include a school, a conference center, and an administration building for the diocese. The total area of the center is six thousand square meters.

== Architecture ==
=== The Domes ===
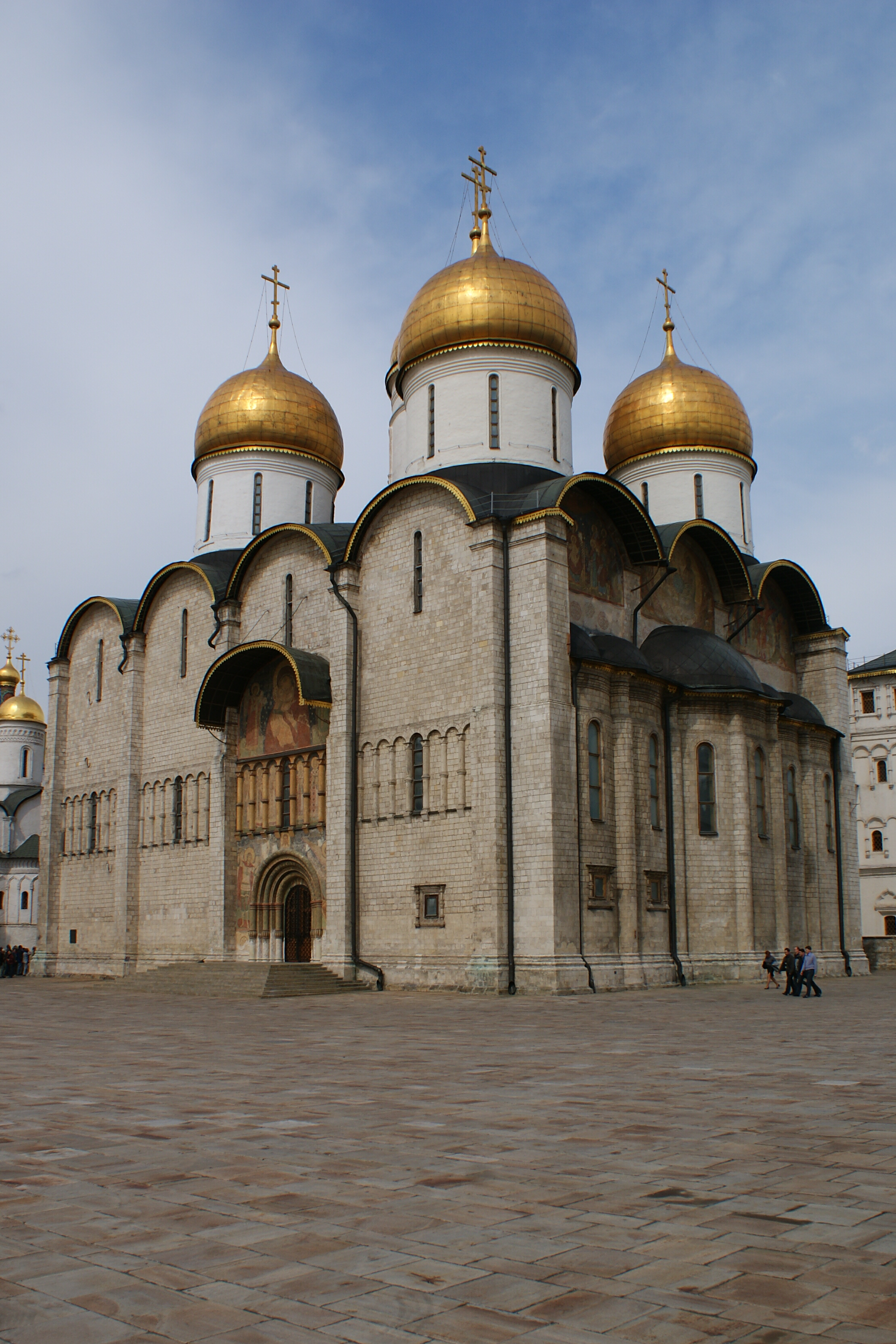
The inspiration for Holy Trinity- the Cathedral of Dormition in Moscow (built 1475)

The principal inspiration for the architecture of the cathedral was the Cathedral of Dormition in Moscow built in 1475, the oldest, largest, and most imposing church in the Moscow Kremlin. That building was designed and built by the Italian architect, Aristotele Fioravanti.

The large central dome of the Holy Trinity Cathedral represents Jesus Christ, while the four surrounding smaller domes represent the principle Apostles, Saint Matthew, Saint Mark, Saint Luke and Saint John.

The particular challenge to the architect and builder was to make the domes as light as possible, to avoid collapsing the building below. The domes were made by the French company Multiplast in Vannes. Each dome is made of eight "pedals" composed of fibreglass and a thermoplastic mix, joined together with resin epoxy. The central dome is twelve meters high and twelve meters in diameter, and weighs eight tons.

The gilding of the domes was carried out by the French enterprise Ateliers Gohard, whose other French projects included the Palace of Versailles and the column in the center of the Place de la Concorde. They covered the surface six hundred square meters with ninety thousand very thin leaves, eight centimetres by eight centimetres, made of an alloy of gold and platinum. The specific color chosen for the alloy was designed to harmonise with the light beige of the Burgundy stones, and to be slightly different from the nearby gilded dome of the Invalides and the statues on the Alexander III Bridge.

The facades of the church are covered with four thousand tons of stone, primarily light-coloured granite, chosen and polished to reflect the sky and the nuances of the light. The facade facing Avenue Rapp has additional decoration in the form of small sculptures of animals and plants.

== Interior ==
The decoration of the cathedral (seen in November 2024) was rather sparse, and concentrated in one room; just outside the Iconostasis, the formal boundary between parts of the church open to parishioners and the inner sanctum. The simplicity. empty space and white color said to imitate the minimalism decoration of the ancient churches of ancient Novgorod.

The Iconostasis in place in November 2024 is temporary. It is to be replaced by a new Iconostasis made of sculpted Italian marble, depicting both Russian saints and the saints of ancient Gaul, including Saint Denis and Saint Genevieve.

The Royal Portal doorway paintings depict a dialogue between the Virgin Mary and the Archangel Gabriel, along with the figures of the Old Testament, David and Solomon.

The walls of the room with the inconostasis are decorated with a number of rare icons from the church collection.

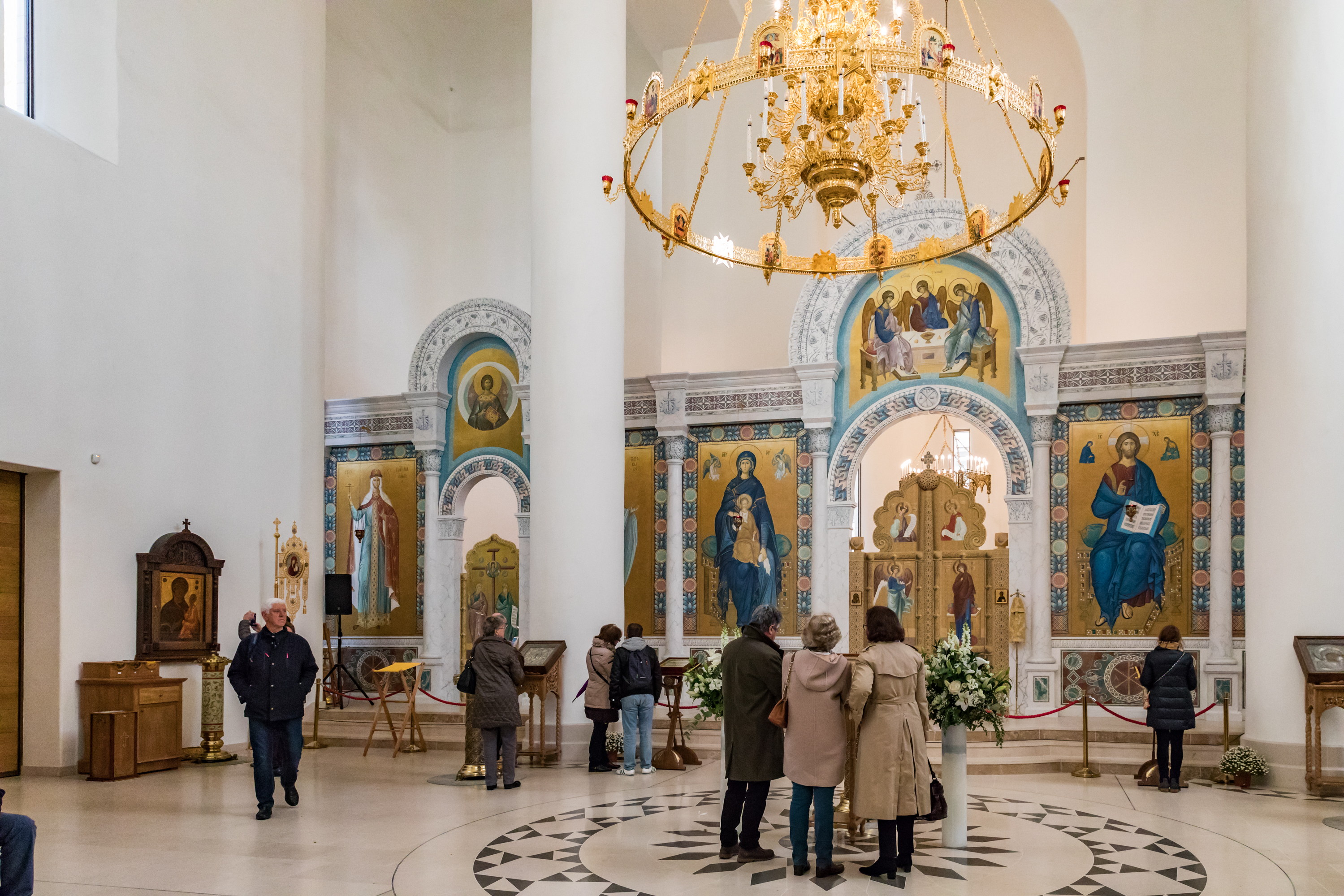
The Iconostasis, or doorway to the inner sanctum

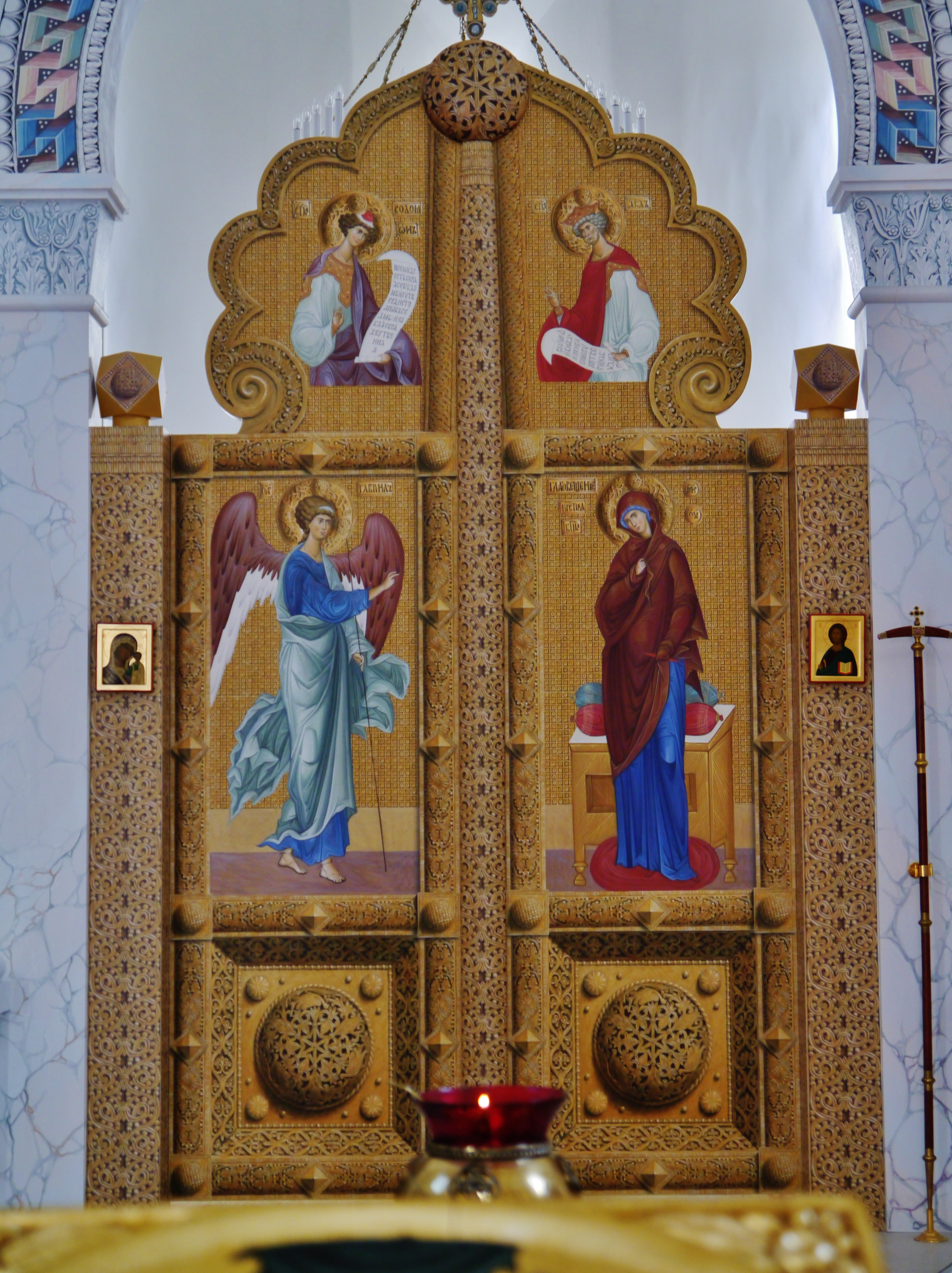
THe Royal Portal, Doorway through the Iconostasis to the inner church

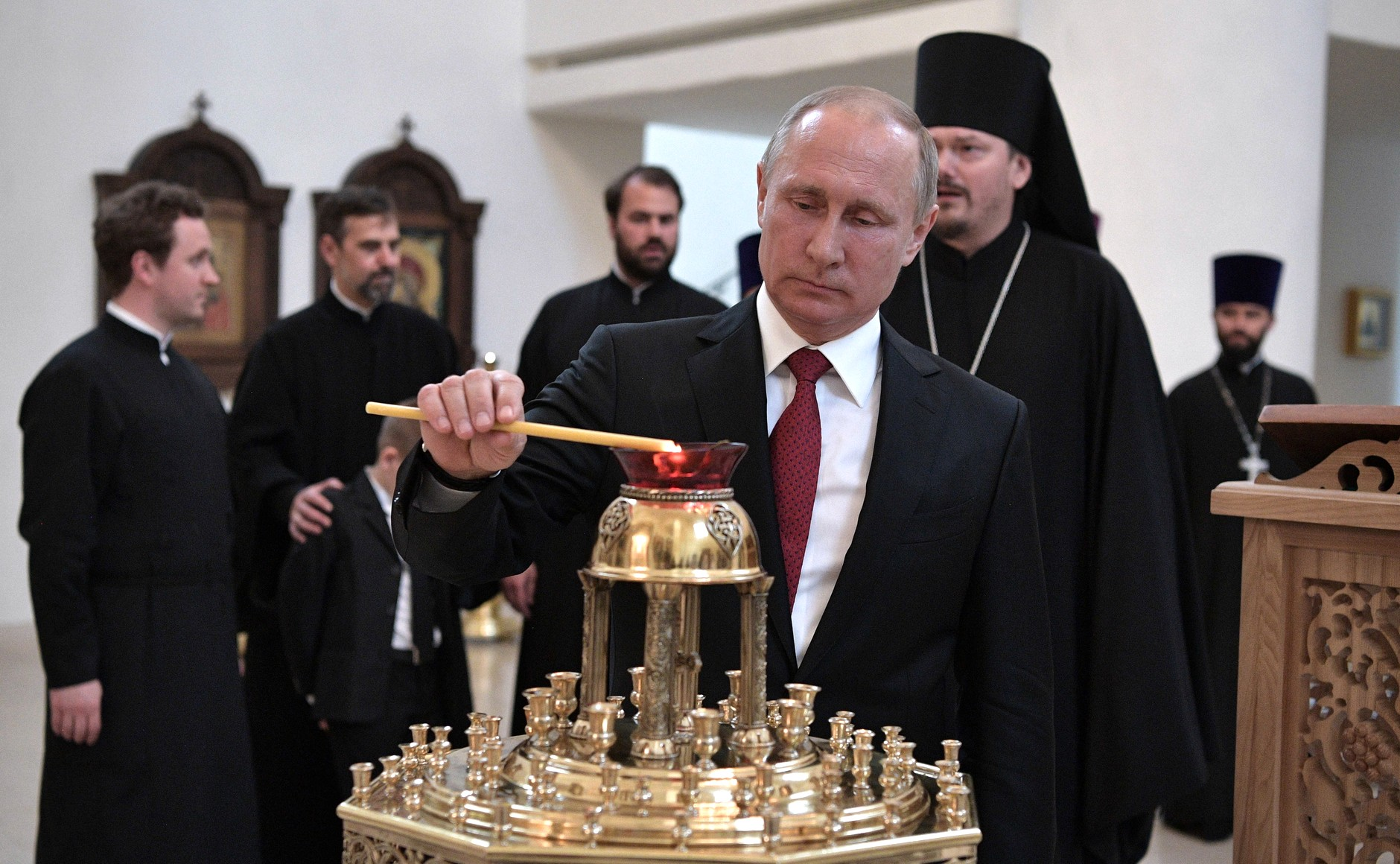
Vladimir Putin visits the Cathedral (May 29, 2017)

== Art in the Cathedral ==
The interior of the church, near the iconostasis, has a small but very fine collection of ancient icons, images of saints and particularly of the Virgin Mary and child

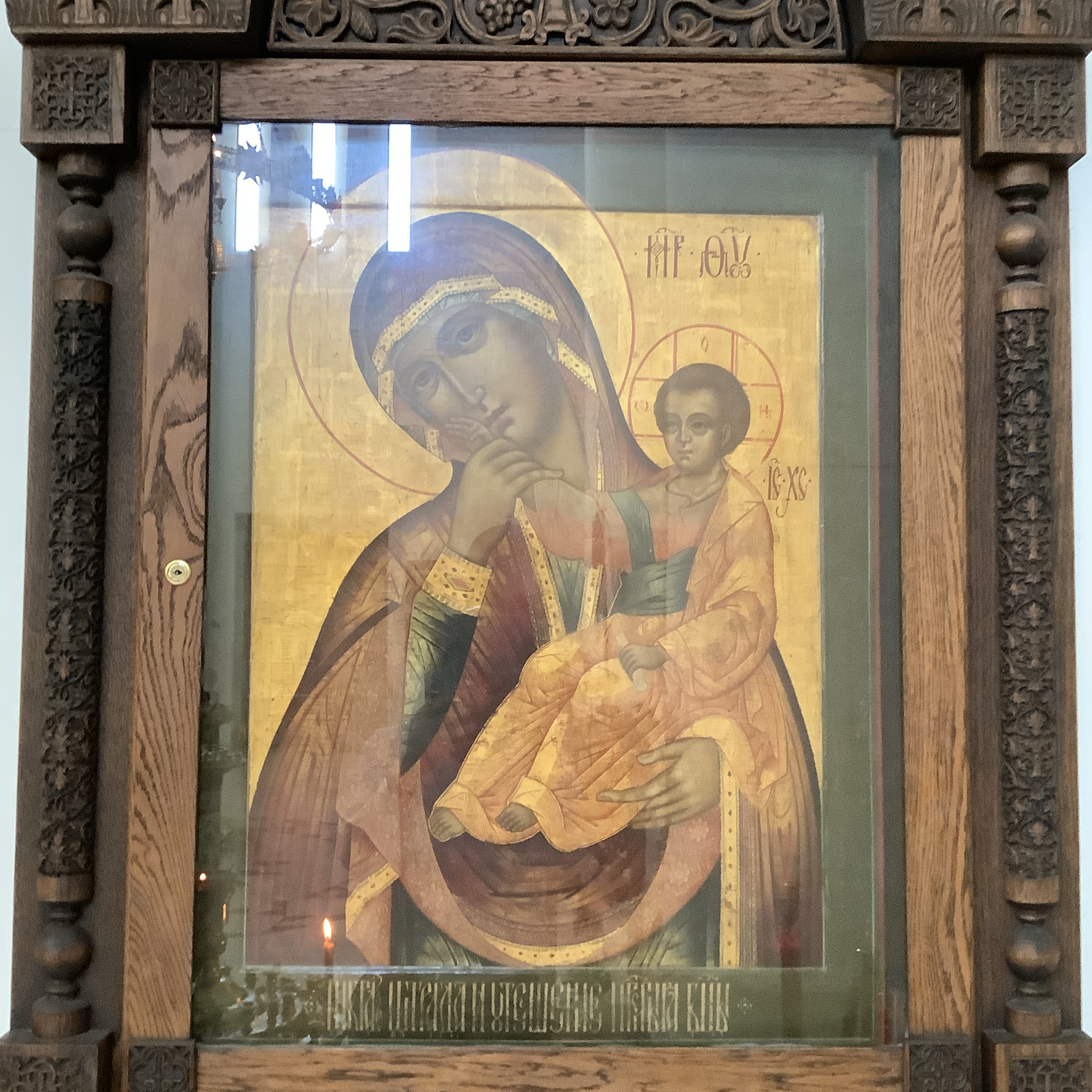
Virgin and Child Icon, (15th c.)

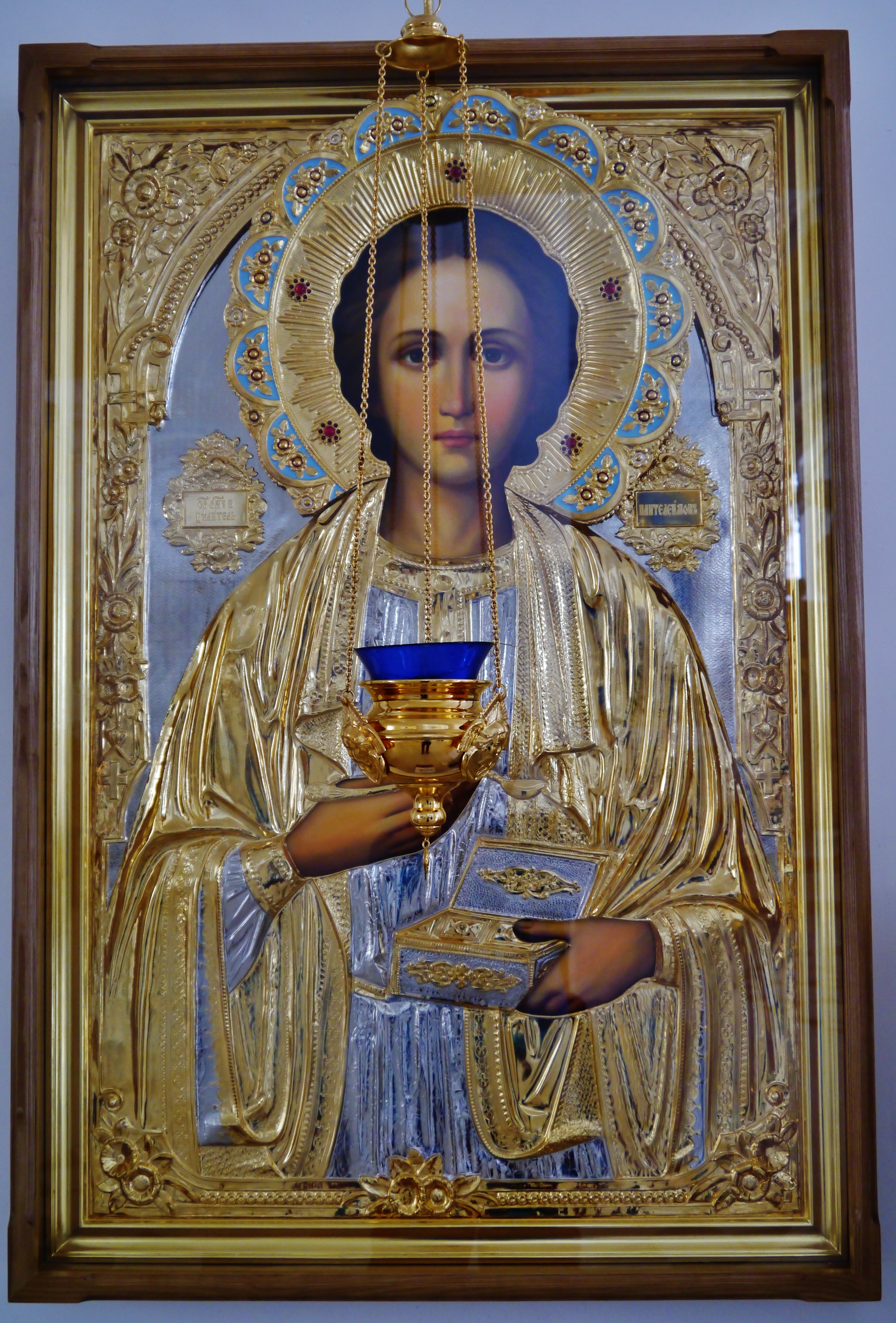
An icon in the cathedral

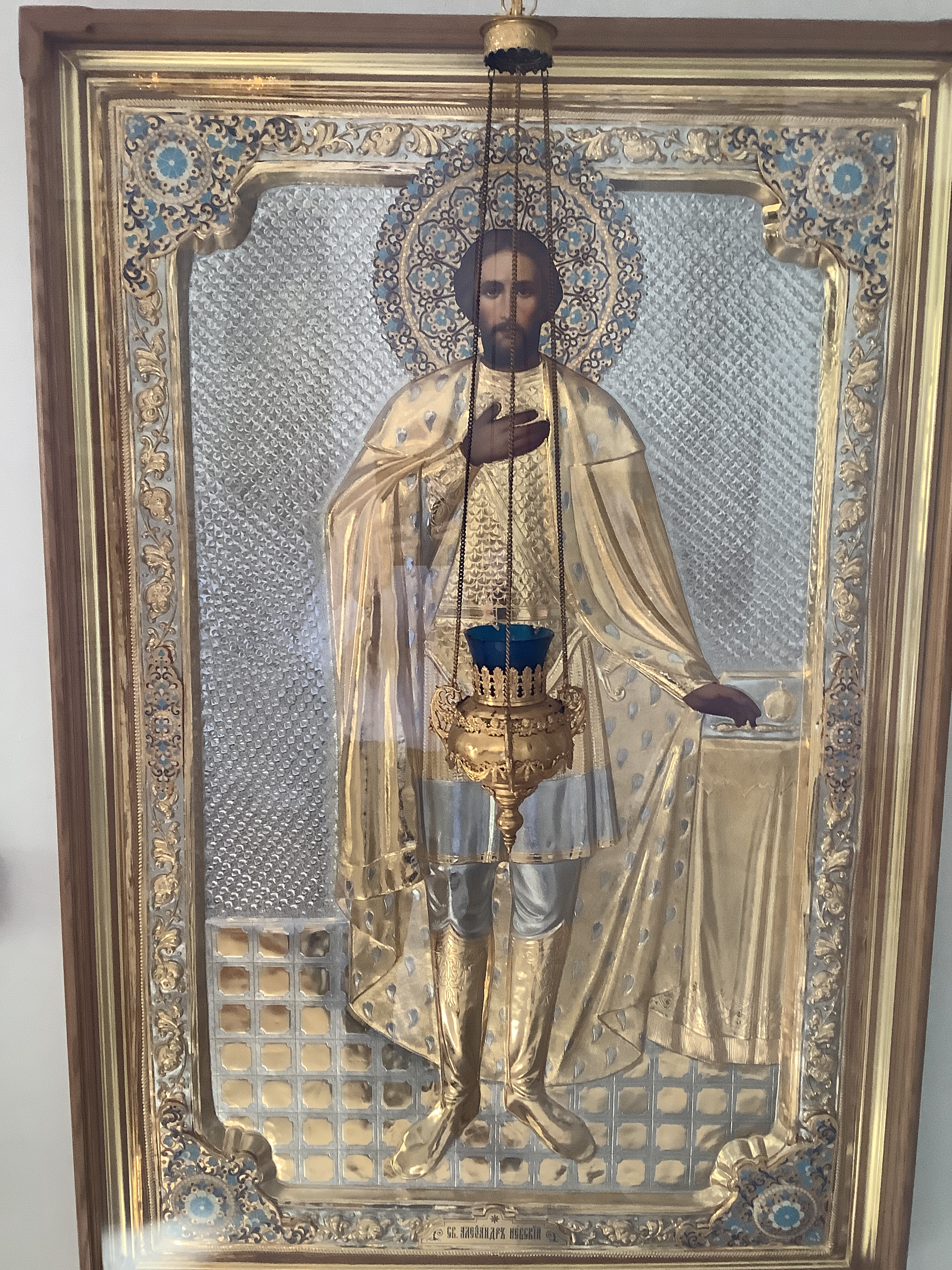
Icon of Saint Alexander Nevsky

== The Cultural and Spiritual Center ==
In addition to the cathedral, the site features a conference center, amphitheatre, a library, the headquarters of the diocese, and a primary school for children taught in both Russian and French. .

plan of The Center

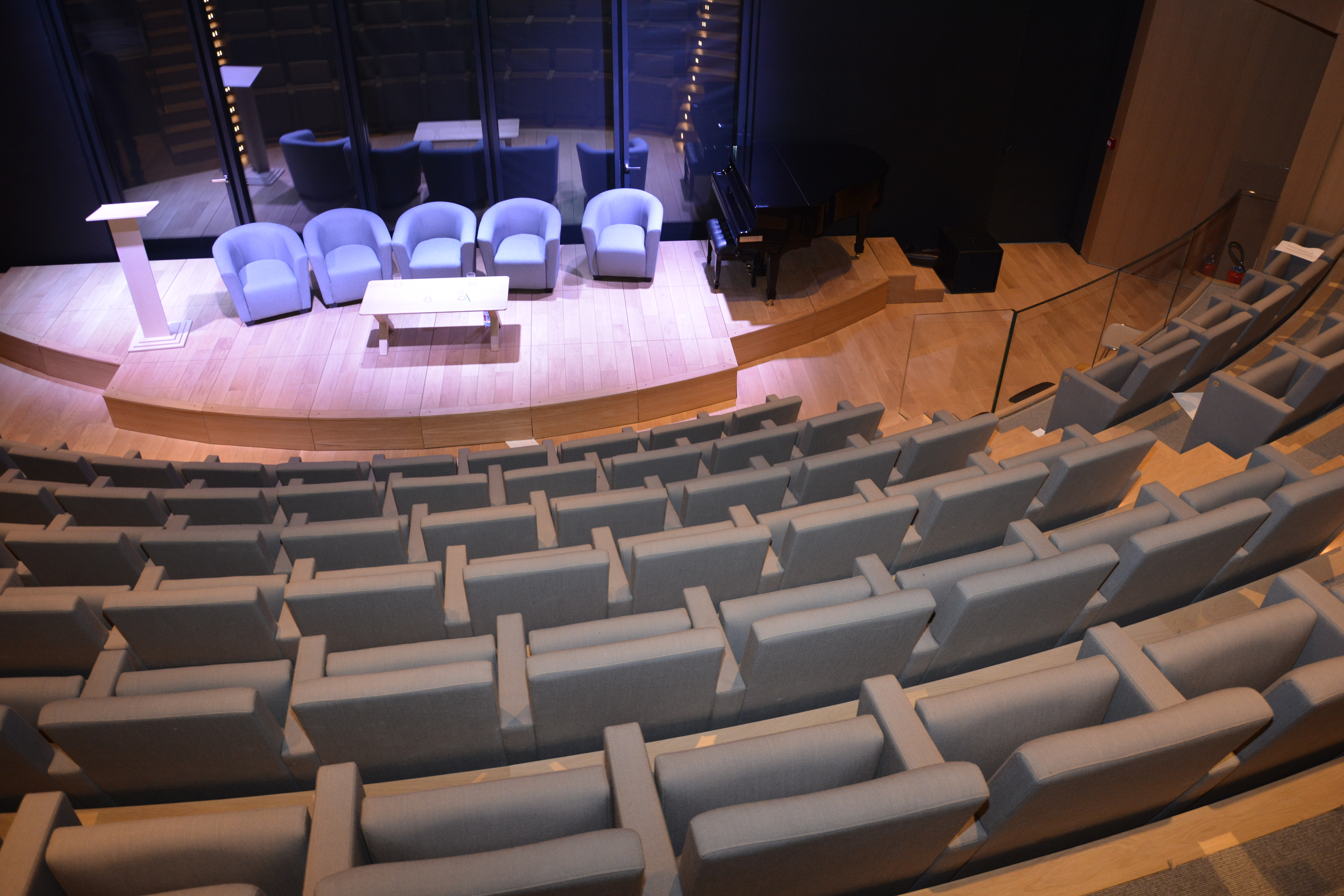
The auditorium

== Bibliography ==
- Krivocheine, Xenia, "Des Bulbes d'Or dans le ciel de Paris - Le Berceau de l'orthodoxie au centre de l'Europe", (2019), Editions Sainte-Genevieve, Paris (in French)
