= Alexander Nevsky Cathedral, Paris =

Alexander Nevsky Cathedral
- Cathedral of Saint Alexander Nevsky
- Cathédrale Saint-Alexandre-Nevsky de Paris
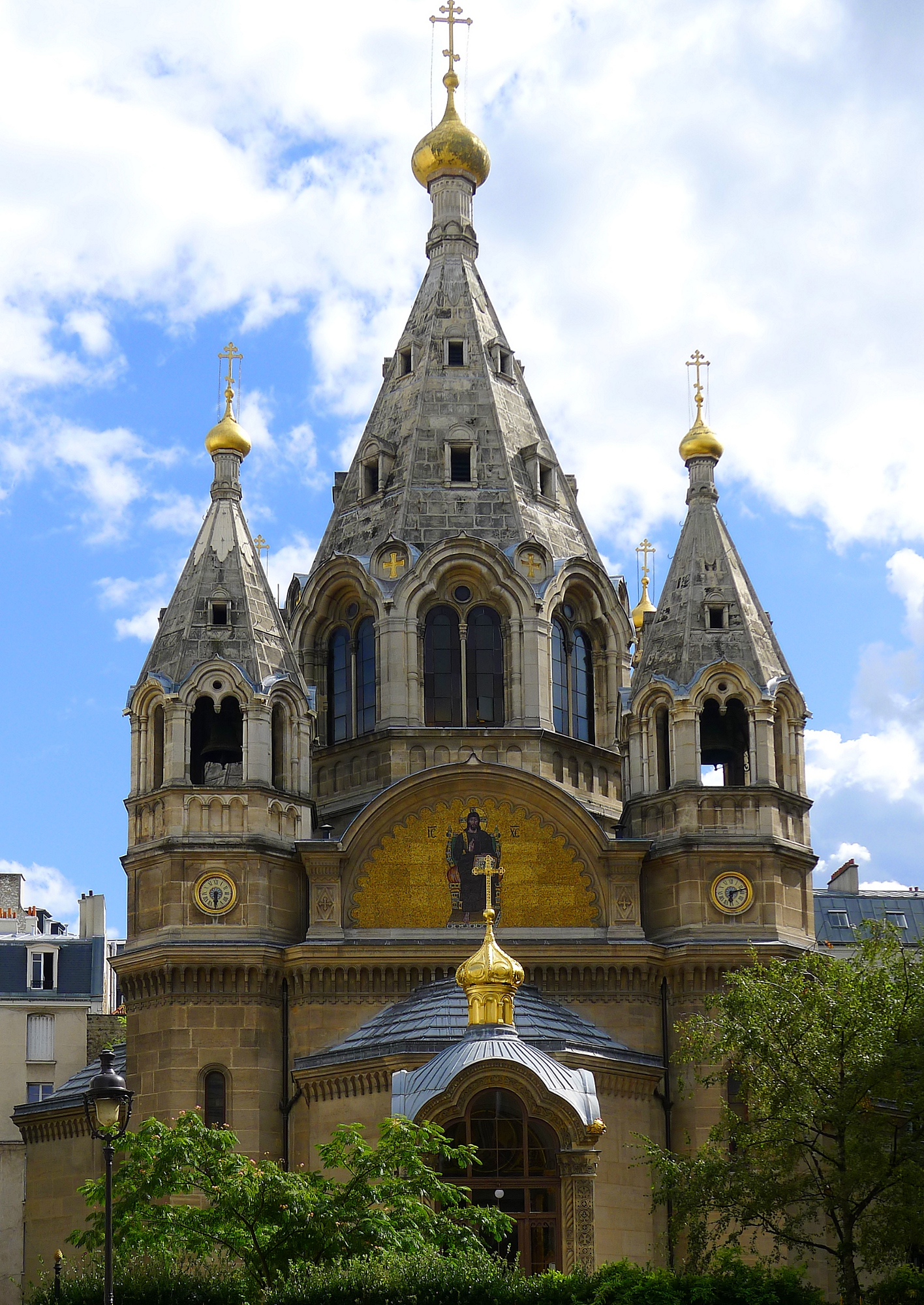

- Location within Paris
- 48°52′39.3″N 2°18′7.1″E
- Location: Paris
- Country: France
- Denomination: Russian Orthodox Church
- Website: cathedrale-orthodoxe.com

History
- Founder(s): Joseph Vassiliev, Alexander II of Russia
- Consecrated: 11 September 1861

Architecture
- Heritage designation: Monument Historique PA00088807
- Designated: 11 May 1981
- Architect(s): Roman Kouzmine, Ivan Strohm
- Architectural type: Cathedral
- Style: Byzantine
- Groundbreaking: 3 March 1859

Administration
- Archdiocese: Patriarchal Exarchate for Orthodox Parishes of Russian Tradition in Western Europe

Clergy
- Archbishop: John of Dubna

The Alexander Nevsky Cathedral (French: Cathédrale Saint-Alexandre-Nevsky, Russian: Собор Святого Александра Невского, romanized: Sobor Svyatogo Aleksandra Nyevskogo) is a Russian Orthodox cathedral church located at 12 Rue Daru in the 8th arrondissement of Paris. The closest métro station is Courcelles.

The Cathedral is under the jurisdiction of the Archdiocese of Orthodox Churches of Russian Tradition in Western Europe, based in Paris. It should not be confused with the Holy Trinity Cathedral and the Russian Orthodox Spiritual and Cultural Center, which opened in Paris in 2016, under the authority of the Moscow patriarch and Russian government.

Services in the main cathedral are conducted in Church Slavonic. Some services in the Crypt are conducted in French.

== History ==
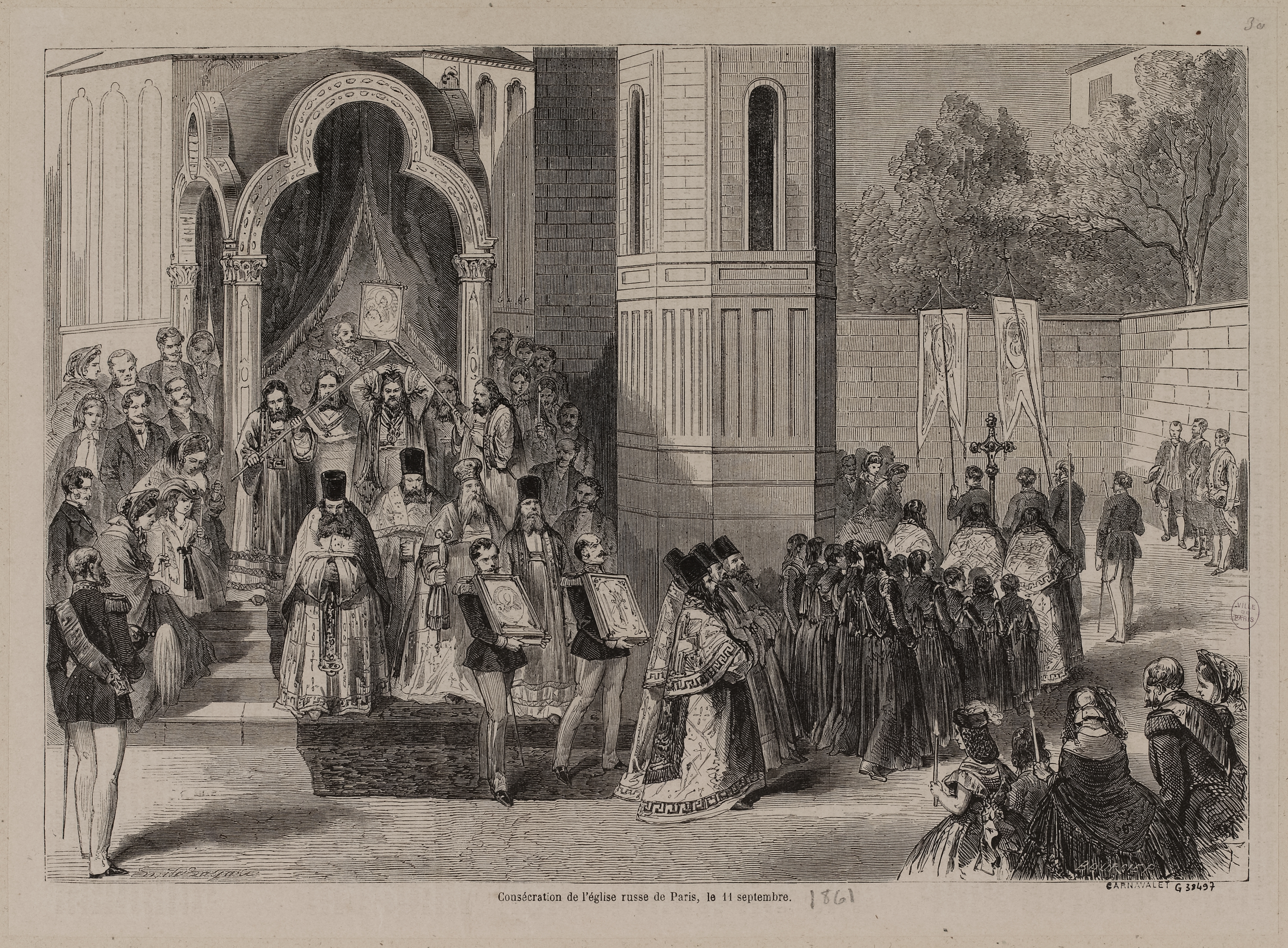
Consecration of Alexander Nevsky Cathedral in 1861

The first Russian Orthodox church in Paris was a small oratory constructed on Rue de Berri in 1816. As the population of Russian immigrants in Paris grew during the 19th century, a larger church was needed. In 1847, the chaplain of the Russian Embassy in Paris, Father Joseph Vassiliev, received permission from Emperor Napoleon III to construct a larger church. The program was moved forward by a grant of 200,000 French francs from Czar Alexander II, whose patron saint was Alexander Nevsky (1219-1263) Nevsky had contributed to the unification of Russia as well as the establishment of the Russian Orthodox church throughout the Russian empire.

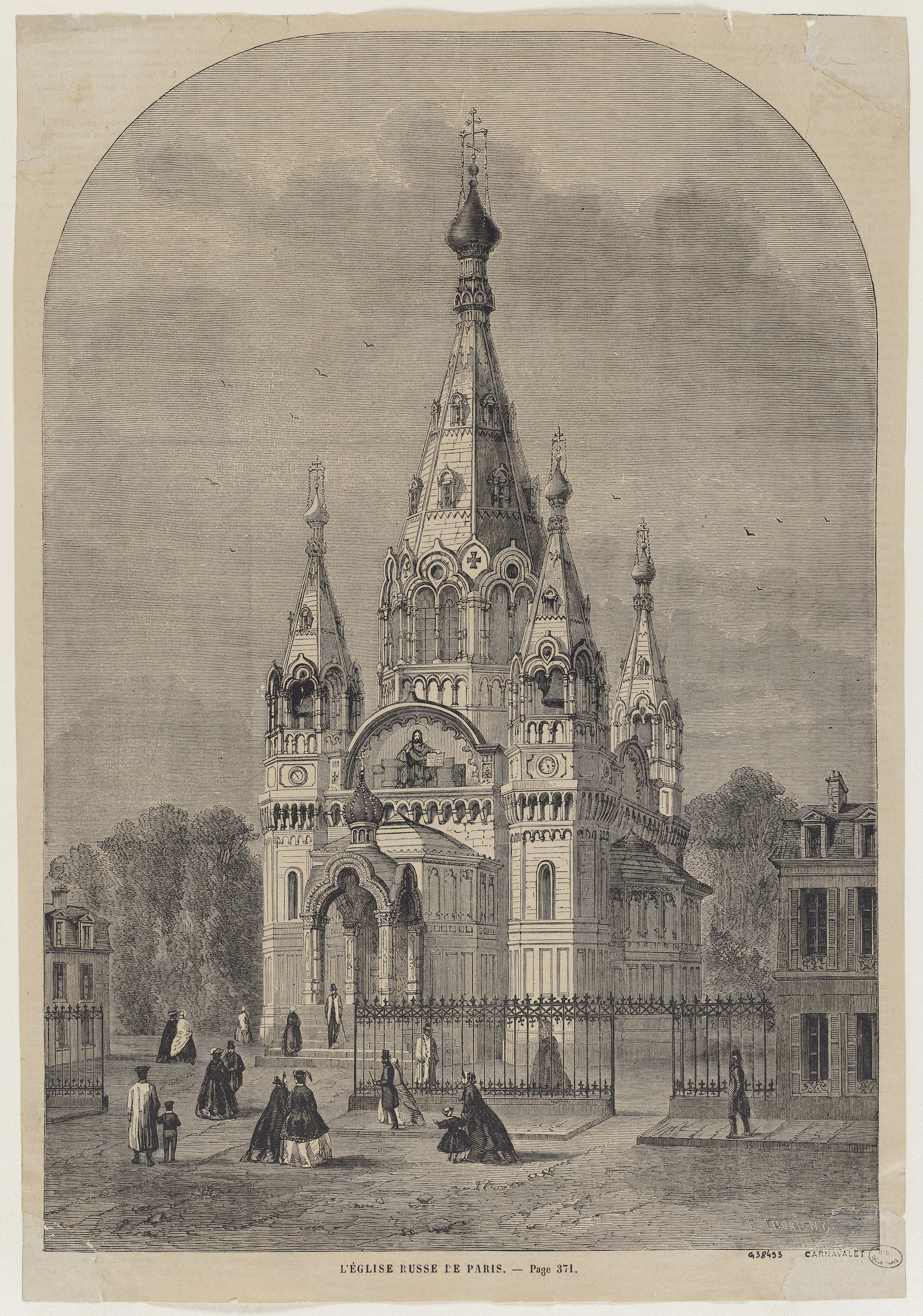
Alexander Nevsky Cathedral in 1870

Work on the church began in 1859 under Roman Kouzmine, chief architect of the Russian imperial Court, and the chief engineer Strohm. The cathedral was established and consecrated in 1861, making it the first Russian Orthodox place of worship in France.

The church was formally given cathedral status in 1951. During the Soviet period, it was the headquarters of an archbishop who supervised the other Russian Orthodox churches in Western Europe, independent of Moscow. Following the downfall of the Soviet Union, the church came under the jurisdiction of the Ecumenical Patriarchate of Constantinople, established in 1931, located in Istanbul, independent of Moscow. The cathedral became the see of the Archdiocese of Russian Orthodox Churches in Western Europe.

In 2016, the Russian Orthodox church opened a new cathedral in Paris, Holy Trinity Orthodox Cathedral, which is under the authority of the Patriarchal Exarchate in Western Europe (Moscow Patriarchate) in Moscow. The cathedral of Alexander Nevsky is independent of Moscow and the Holy Trinity cathedral.

== Exterior ==
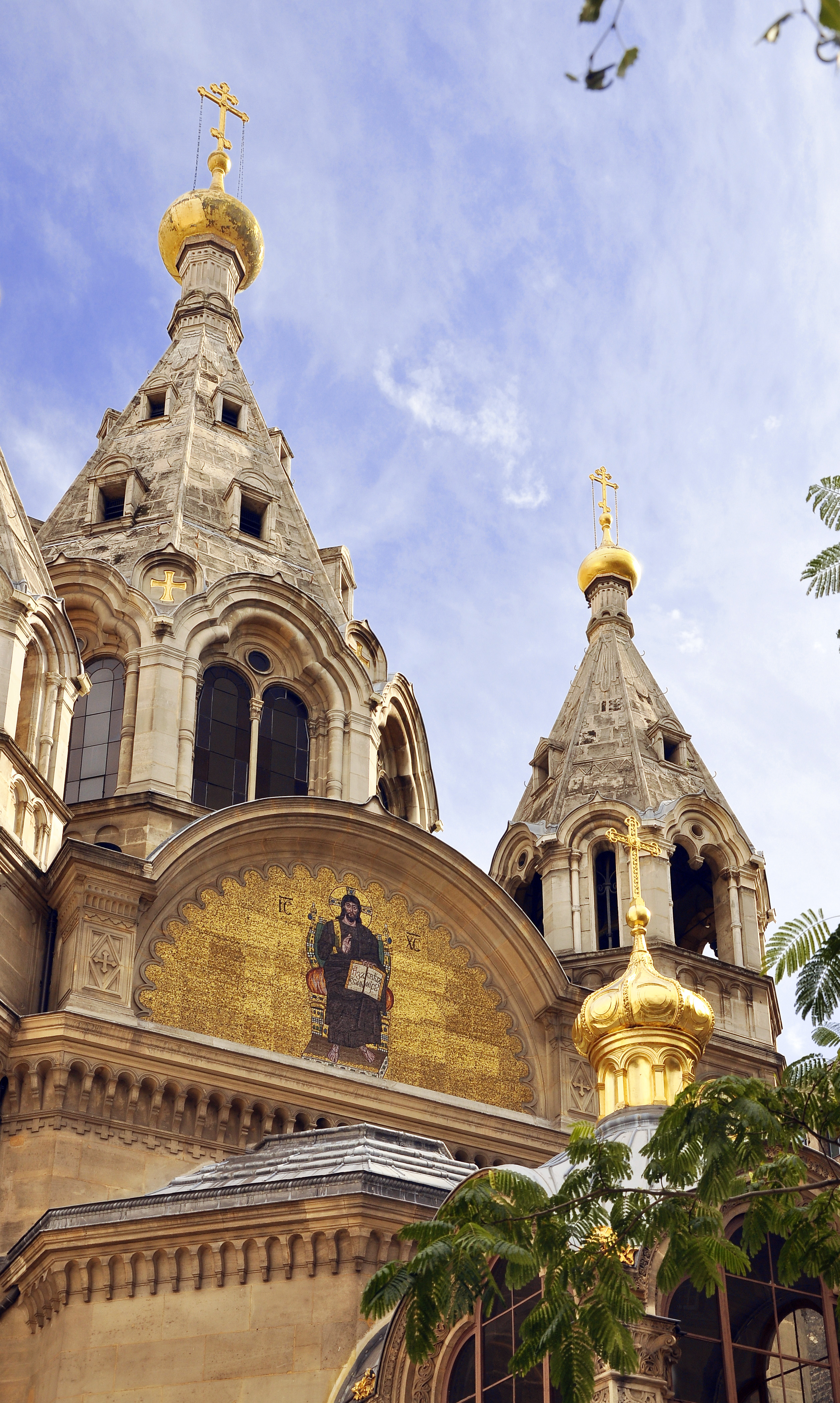
facade and towers

The exterior of the church is a good example, of what its builder, the Russian diplomat to France Joseph Valliliev, called "Byzantine Muscovite". It used the Byzantine form of Greek cross and a semi-circular pediment with a mosaic image of Christ giving a blessing. The distinctly Russian element was the group of five bell towers which symbolised Christ and the four evangelists. The towers are topped with gilded bulblike domes, which symbolise the flames of candles carried by the worshippers, which lift their prayers to heaven. The central tower is topped by a Russian Orthodox cross.

The church has a crypt, known as the "Lower Church". dedicated to the Holy Trinity, In 1963 the crypt became the official place of worship of the Russian Orthodox Church in France.

== Interior - the Iconostasis ==
The plan of the interior is inspired by that of the Hagia Sophia basilica in Constantinople. It is highly decorated with paintings, gilding and polychrome deocoration illustrating the history and doctrines of the church. The Iconostasis is a highly decorated screen, which separates the altar area, used only by the clergy, from the worshippers in the nave. The iconostasis has three portals: the Sacred Portal or Royal Portal in the center, used only by the clergy; and north and south portals, used by lesser clerics and religious officials.

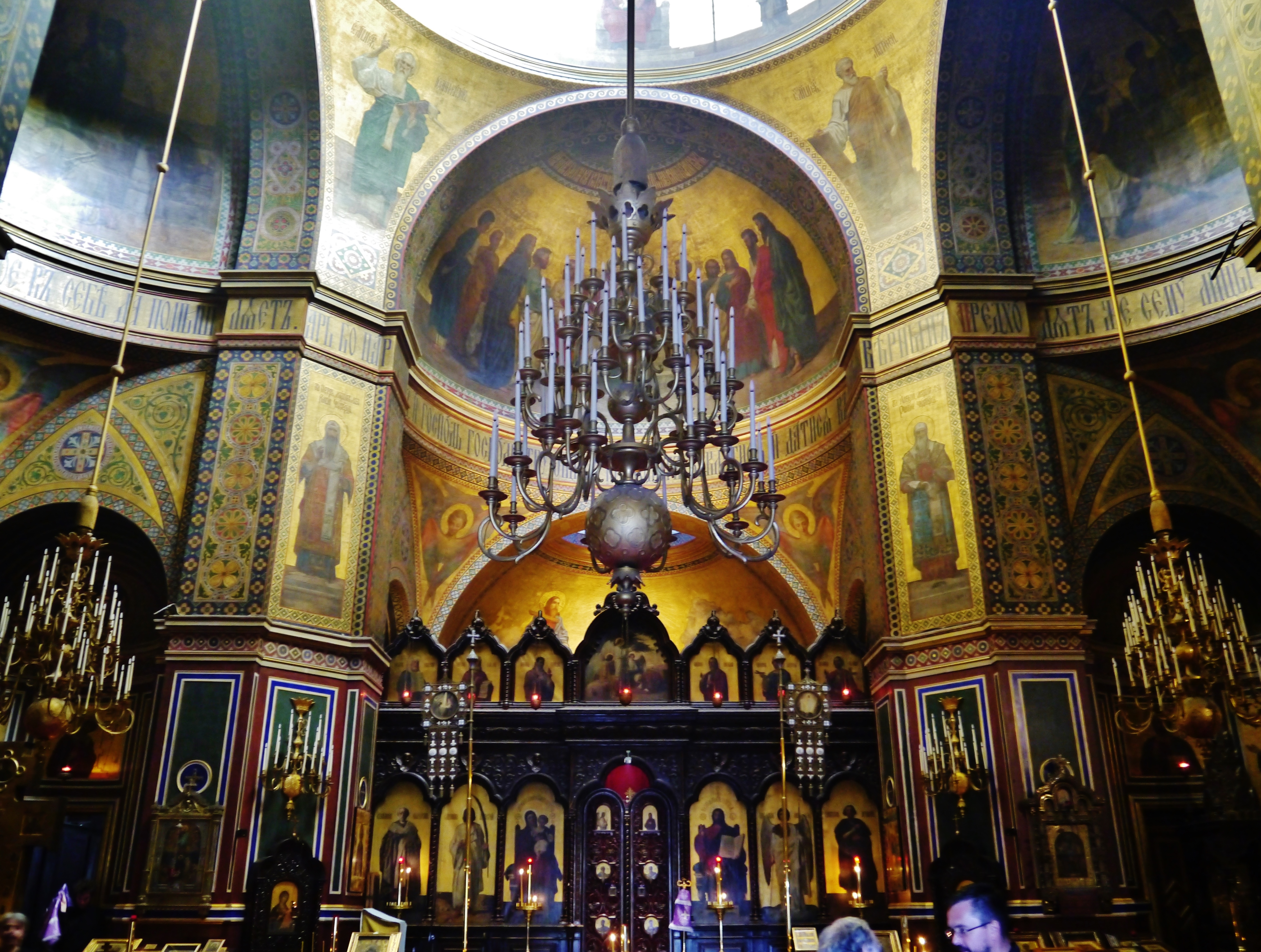
Prayer Hall and the Iconostasis

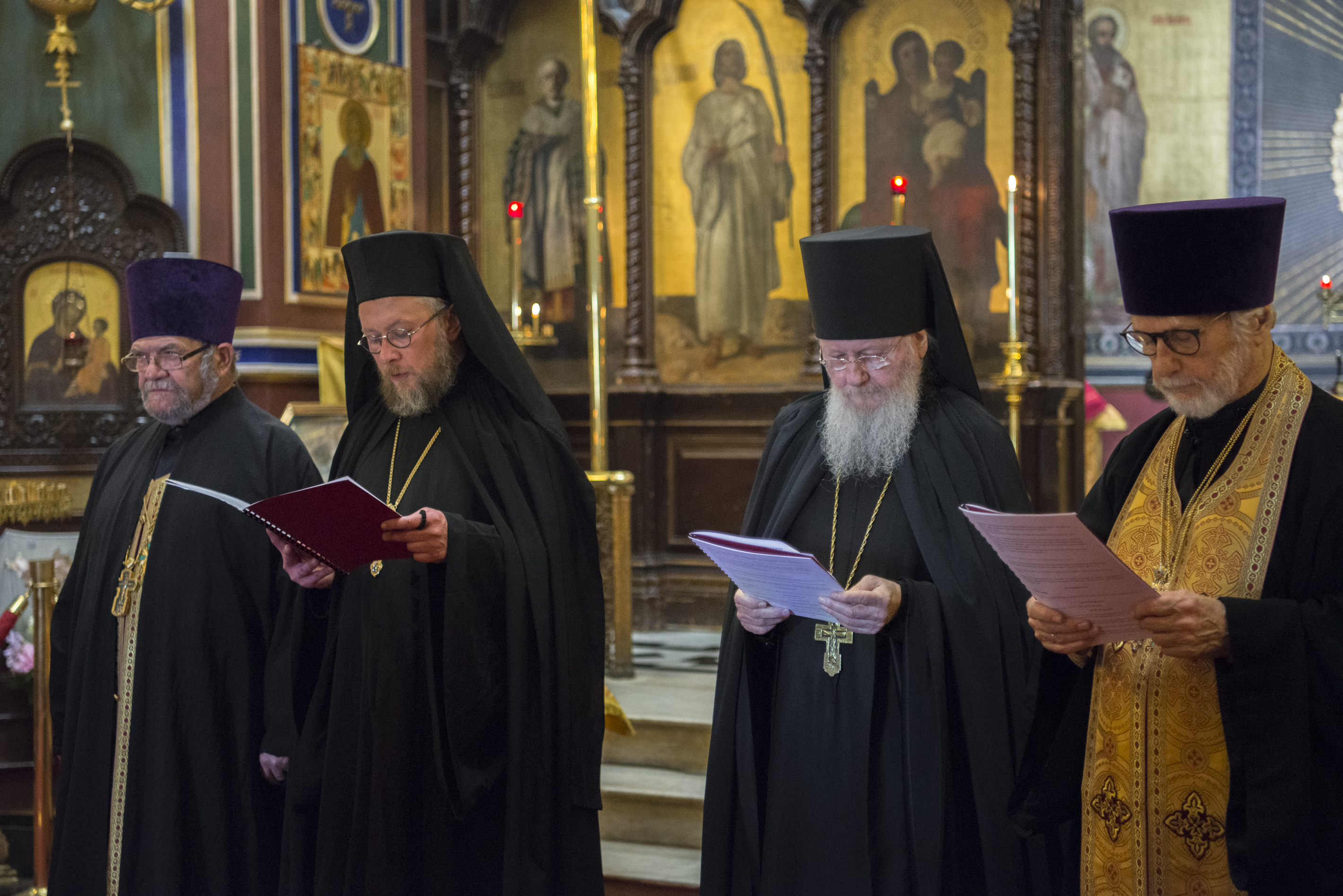
Clergy in front of the Iconostasis

The Iconostasis presents a series of icons in a specific theological hierarchy. The doors of the Royal Portal have icons of the Annunciation and the four Evangelists, painted by Evgraf Sorokine. The icons to the right of the Royal Portal show Christ, Aleksander Nevsky, and the Archangel Michael. To the left of the Iconostasis are icons of the Virgin Mary, Saint Stephen, and Saint Nicholas of Myra.

The upper level of the Iconostasis features a central icon of the Holy Trinity, painted by Pauel Sorokine, flanked by icons of saints and figures from the Old Testament.

The walls are further decorated with murals by D. Sorokine and Feodor Bronnikov depicting major events in the history of Christianity and important moments of the liturgy. The murals depict the Adoration of the Shepherds, the Sermon on the Mount, the Entry of Christ into Jerusalem, and the Last Supper.

Two additional murals by Bogolubov depict "Christ Walking on the Waters" and "Christ Preaching at the Lake of Tiberias."

== The crypt ==
The crypt, or lower level of the cathedral, has the distinction of being the home of separate Parish, "La paroisse de la Tres Sainte Trinite." It was one the first parishes of a Russian Orthodox Church where the services are conducted in French as well as Slavic. It was consecrated in 1863, and much later, in 1964 the crypt was formally declared the official place of worship for the French-Russian Orthodox community.

== Notable parishioners ==
- Nikolai Aleksandrovich Semashko, the first People's Commissar for Health of Soviet Russia, married Nadezhda Mikhailovna Nelidova (née Sokol’skaia) here on 13 August 1909.
- Gabriel Attal, prime minister of France, attended services as a child.
- Artist Pablo Picasso married Olga Khokhlova here on 12 July 1918; the witnesses were Jean Cocteau, Max Jacob, and Guillaume Apollinaire.
- Henri Troyat’s first marriage was conducted here in 1938.
- Former world chess champion Vladimir Kramnik married here in 2006.
- The funerals of several noted Russian artists, writers, and other cultural figures were held here: Ivan Turgenev in 1883, Fyodor Chaliapin in 1938, Wassily Kandinsky in 1944, George Gurdjieff in 1949, Ivan Bunin in 1953, Andrei Tarkovsky in 1987, and Henri Troyat in 2007.
- Alexander Schmemann, noted Russian theologian and writer, and future dean of St. Vladimir's Orthodox Theological Seminary (1962-1983) in New York, served here as an altar boy and sub-deacon in the 1930s.
- Vassily Voskresensky aka Colonel Wassily de Basil, impresario of the Ballets Russes de Monte Carlo (and its iterations) was buried here in 1951.
- His Imperial Highness The Grand Duke Gavriil Constantinovitch of Russia and his wife Her Serene Highness Princess Romanovskaya-Strelninskaya each regularly attended services here prior to their respective deaths. The Grand Duke died in 1955, and the Princess died in 1950.

== Representation in other media ==
The 1956 film Anastasia, about one of the daughters of the imperial Romanov family, features the Cathedral in one of its first scenes.

== Gallery ==
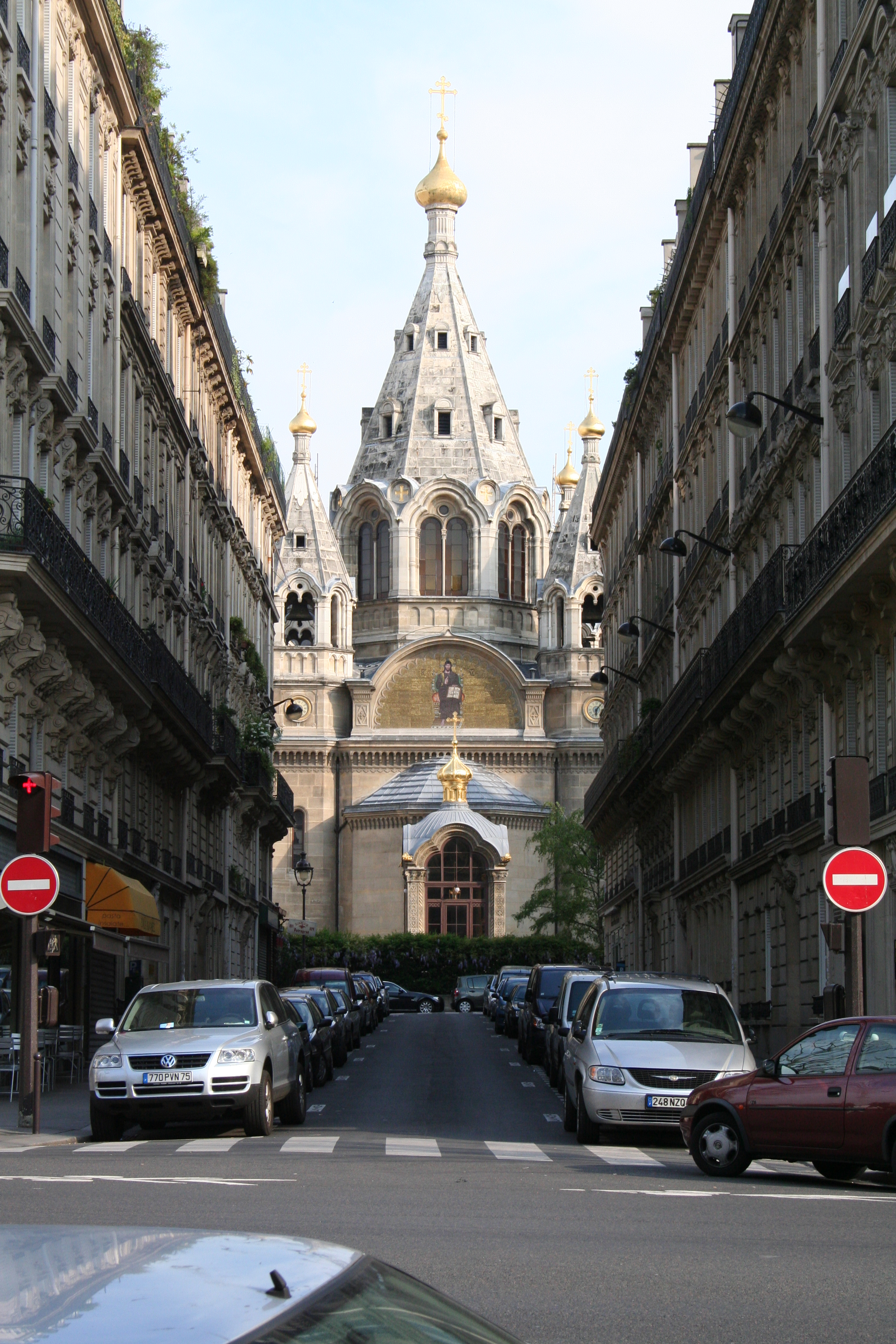
View of church from Boulevard Courcelles

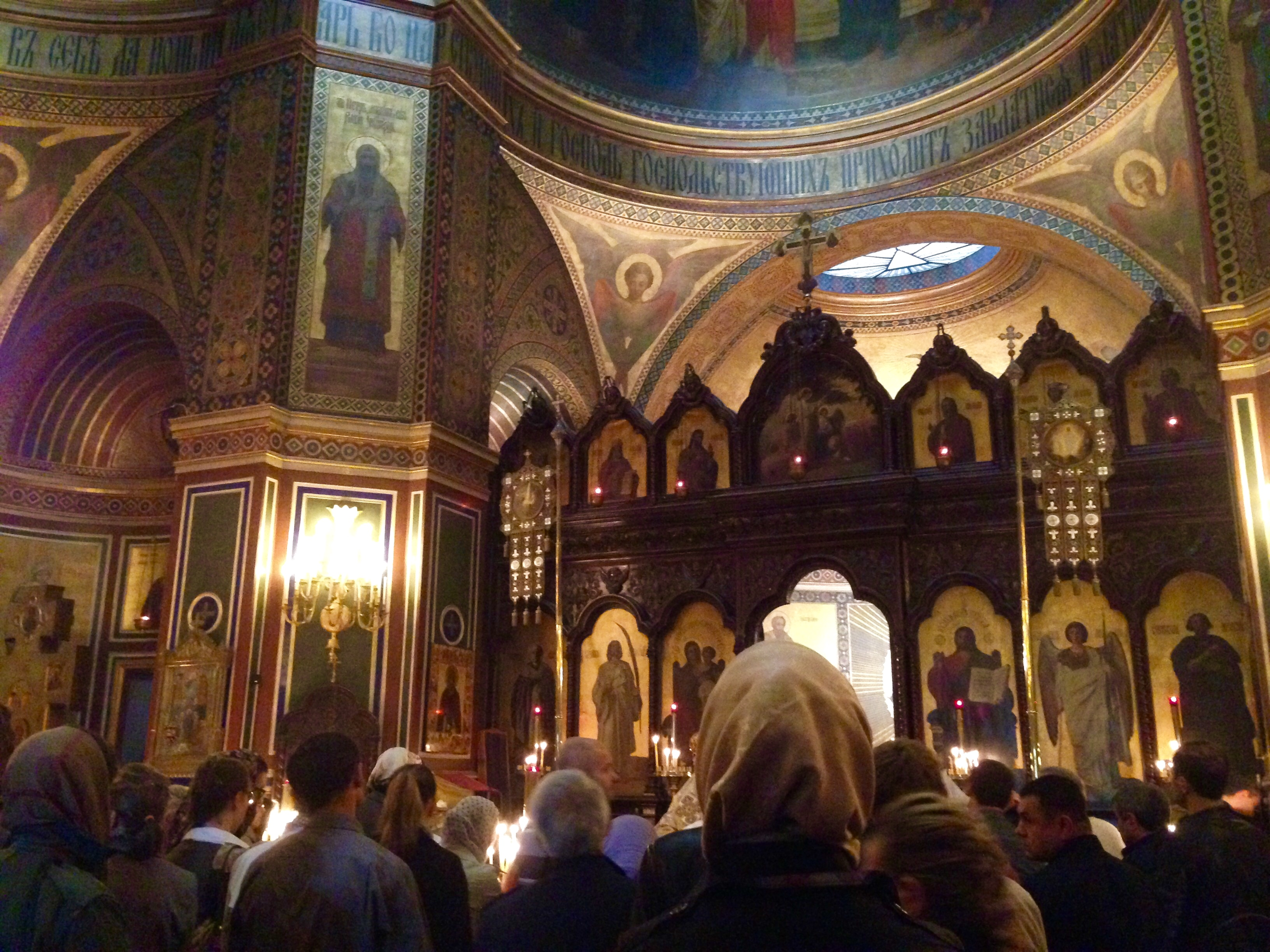
Altar and the Iconostasis during a service

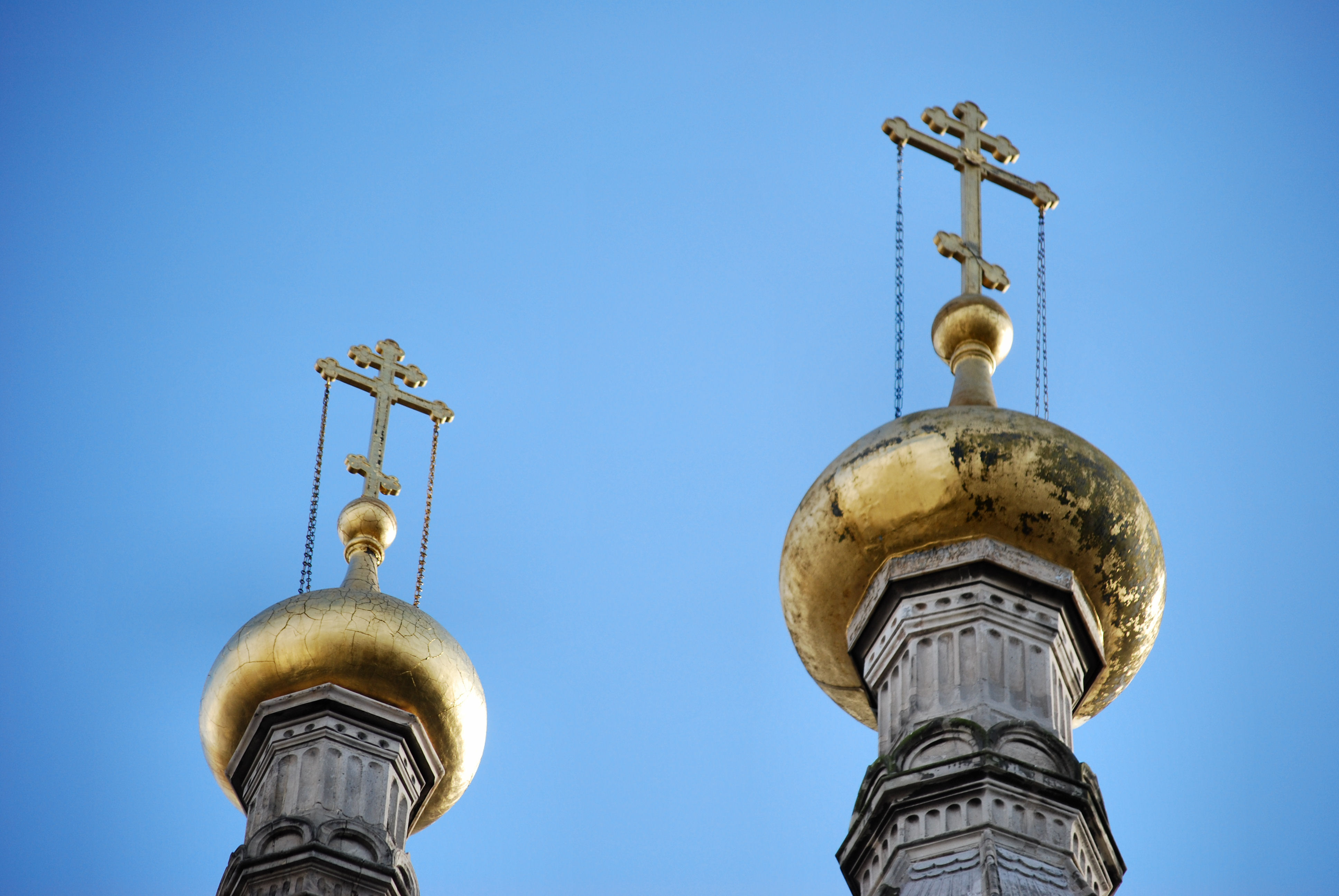
Church spires

== Related sites ==
- Alexander Nevsky Cathedral, Paris

== Bibliography ==
- Dumoulin, Aline; Ardisson, Alexandra; Maingard, Jérôme; Antonello, Murielle; Églises de Paris (2010), Éditions Massin, Issy-Les-Moulineaux, ISBN 978-2-7072-0683-1
- Nicolas Ross, Saint-Alexandre sur-Seine, édition du CERF.
