= Jean-Michel Wilmotte =

French architect (born 1948)

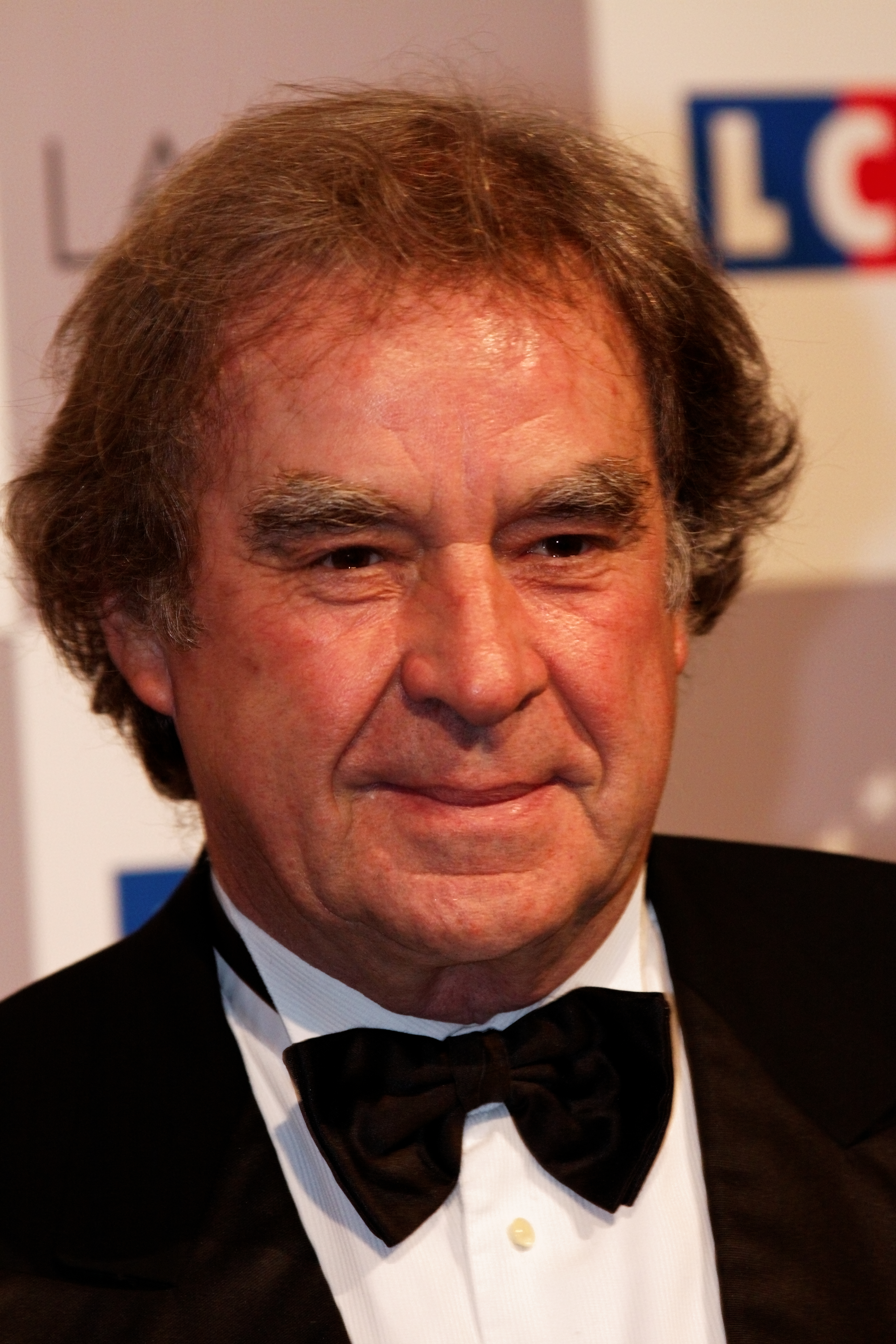
- Wilmotte in 2012
- Born: Jean-Michel Léon Bernard Wilmotte; 2 April 1948 (age 78); Soissons, France
- Education: École Camondo
- Occupation: Architect
- Works: Allianz Riviera, Nice (2013); Holy Trinity Cathedral and the Russian Orthodox Spiritual and Cultural Center, Paris (2016)

Jean-Michel Léon Bernard Wilmotte (French pronunciation: [ʒɑ̃miʃɛl wilmɔt]; born 2 April 1948) is a French architect, urbanist and designer.

== Biography ==
Jean-Michel Wilmotte was born in Soissons, Aisne in 1948 to pharmacist Robert Wilmotte and Suzanne Léonard. He attended secondary school at the Soisson lycée and the Jean-de-La-Fontaine lycée in Château-Thierry. He studied interior design at the Camondo school of interior design in Paris. Two years after graduating, he founded his own agency in Paris in 1975. In 1982 he was commissioned by President François Mitterrand to design his refurbished private apartments in the Élysée Palace.

He was elected to the Académie d'architecture in 2001, and to the Académie des beaux-arts in 2015.

== Honours ==
- Officer of the Legion of Honour (2022)
- Knight of the Ordre national du Mérite (1994)
- Commander of the Ordre des Arts et des Lettres (1992)
- Knight of the Ordre des Palmes académiques (1986)

== Bibliography ==
- Ceci n'est pas un parc, entretien avec Jean-Michel Wilmotte. Éditions Libel, Lyon (France), 2010 ISBN 9782917659083
- Jean-Michel Wilmotte, Architecture – Ecriture, Dane McDowell, Éditions Aubanel, Paris (France), 2009 ISBN 9782700606898
- Jean-Michel Wilmotte, Architectures à l'oeuvre, François Lamarre, Pascal Tournaire, Stéphane Paoli, Éditions Le Moniteur, Paris (France), 2008 ISBN 9782281194012
- Wilmotte, l'instinct architecte, Jean Grisoni, Jean-Baptiste Loubeyre, Éditions Le Passage, Paris (France), 2005 ISBN 2847420819
- Architecture intérieure des villes, Jean-Michel Wilmotte, Paul Virilio, Éditions du Moniteur, Paris (France), 1999 ISBN 2281191044
- Jean-Michel Wilmotte, Francis Rambert, Éditions du Regard, Paris (France), 1996 ISBN 2841050262
- Réalisations et projets, Jean-Michel Wilmotte, Éditions du Moniteur, Paris (France), 1993 ISBN 2281190706
- Wilmotte, Jean-Louis Pradel, Éditions Electa Moniteur, Paris (France), 1988 ISBN 286653056X
