= Pierre Paulin =

French designer (1927–2009)

- Born: 9 July 1927; Paris, France
- Died: 13 June 2009 (aged 81); Montpellier, France
- Education: École Camondo
- Known for: Furniture design
- Notable work: Louvre's furniture (1968), Mobilier National French Institution furniture (1967–68)
- Movement: Mid-Century Modern; Functional Furniture

Pierre Paulin (French pronunciation: [pjɛʁ polɛ̃]; 9 July 1927 – 13 June 2009) was a French furniture and interior designer. He is best known for his innovative furniture designs in collaboration with the Dutch manufacturer Artifort, in the 1960s, and for his interior design projects in the 1970s. His work is associated with modernist and functionalist design and an experimental use of materials.

== Biography ==
=== Early life ===
Paulin was born in Paris in 1927 to a French father and a German-speaking Swiss mother. After failing his baccalauréat, Paulin trained as a ceramist in Vallauris on the French Riviera, and later, as a stone‑carver in Burgundy. While training to create sculptures, he sustained an injury to his right arm which ended his plans to become a sculptor. He attended the École Camondo in Paris afterwards.

Pierre was the nephew of Georges Paulin, who was a part-time automobile designer and invented the mechanical retractable hardtop. Georges Paulin was later executed by the Nazis in 1941 and was posthumously honored by the French government for his service in the French Resistance.

=== Early career ===
After completing his studies at the École Camondo, Paulin began his career by joining Marcel Gascoin's design studio in Le Havre. Through this relationship, he gained an interest in Scandinavian and Japanese design, which would influence his later work.

In the 1950s and early 1960s, Paulin made his debut at the Salon des arts ménagers in 1953, where he appeared on the cover of the magazine La Maison Française. In 1954, he began working for the Thonet company, where he experimented with stretching swimwear materials over traditionally made chairs. In 1958, Paulin collaborated with the Maastricht-based Dutch manufacturer Artifort. While at Artifort, he became famous for his Mushroom chair design in 1960.

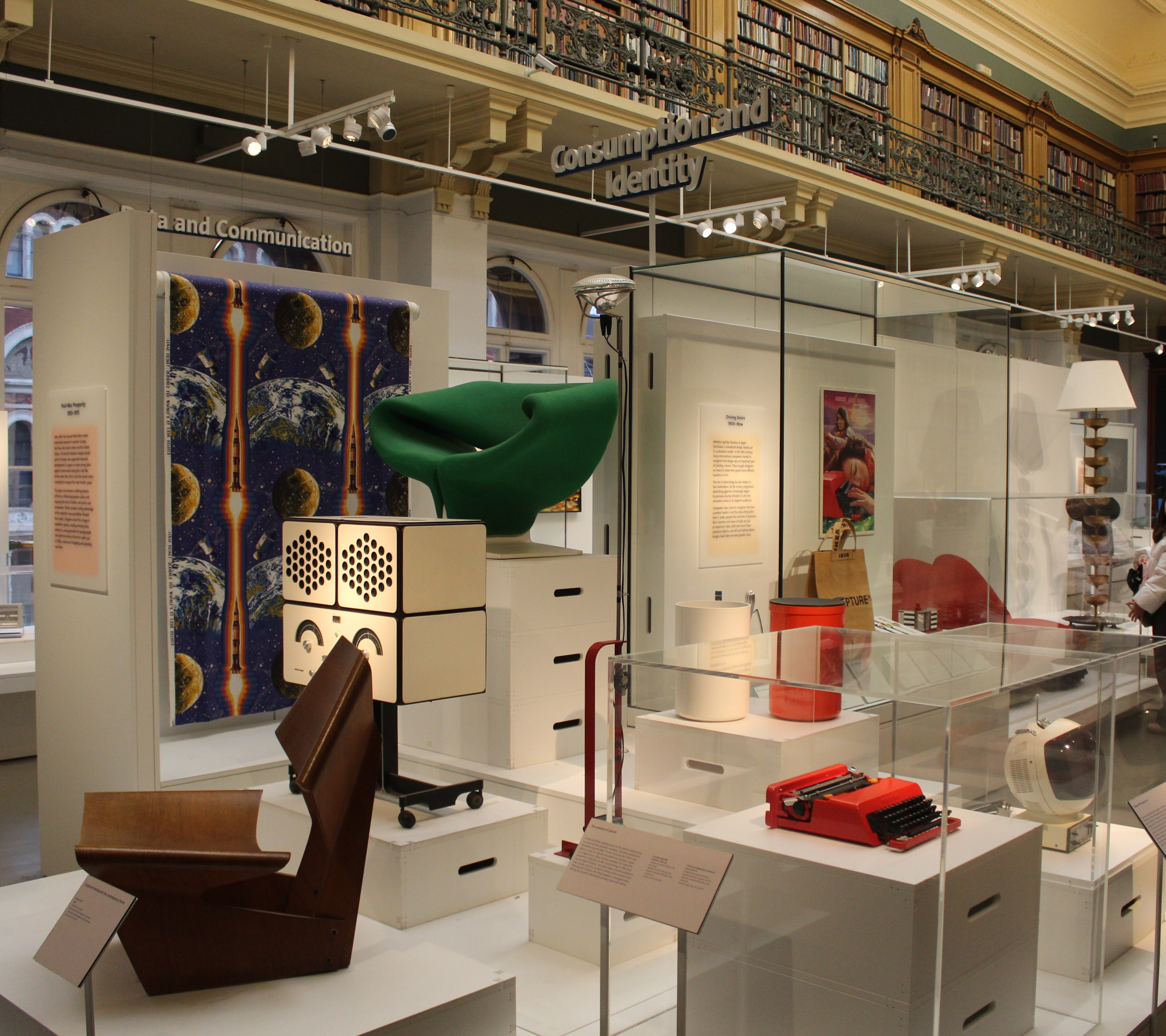
Paulin's Ribbon Chair in the Victoria and Albert Museum, London

In 2008, Paulin reflected on his time working for Artifort. He commented, "It represented the first full expression of my abilities. I considered the manufacture of chairs to be rather primitive and I was trying to think up new processes." He had worked with foam and rubber from Italy attached to a light metallic frame and covered by a new stretch material. Paulin's designs and furniture emphasized applied design, focusing on form with comfort as his chairs' starting-point. These novel choices made his chair designs to be round and comfortably shaped, which is an influence on chairs today.

=== Later career ===
During the 1970s and 1980s, he was invited to decorate and furnish several important places for important people. He redecorated the living, dining, smoking, and exhibition rooms of the Élysée's private apartments for Pompidou in 1971. In 1983, he furnished the office of François Mitterrand. In 1979 he launched his own consultancy and worked for Calor, Ericsson, Renault, Saviem, Tefal, Thomson, and Airbus.

Paulin retired in 1994 and moved to the Cévennes in southern France, though he continued to design furniture. He died on 13 June 2009 in a hospital in Montpellier, France.

== Furniture design ==
=== Chairs ===
Pierre Paulin was well known for designing chairs. He worked with foams and metallic frames covered with stretch materials, designs admired for "their clear lines, the sensual feel of their material or just simply for the way their shapes cradled the body." His designs were widely popular during their time and have influenced other designers, such as Olivier Mourgue. Paulin influenced Olivier Mourgue's Djinn chairs, which were featured in Stanley Kubrick's 2001: A Space Odyssey.

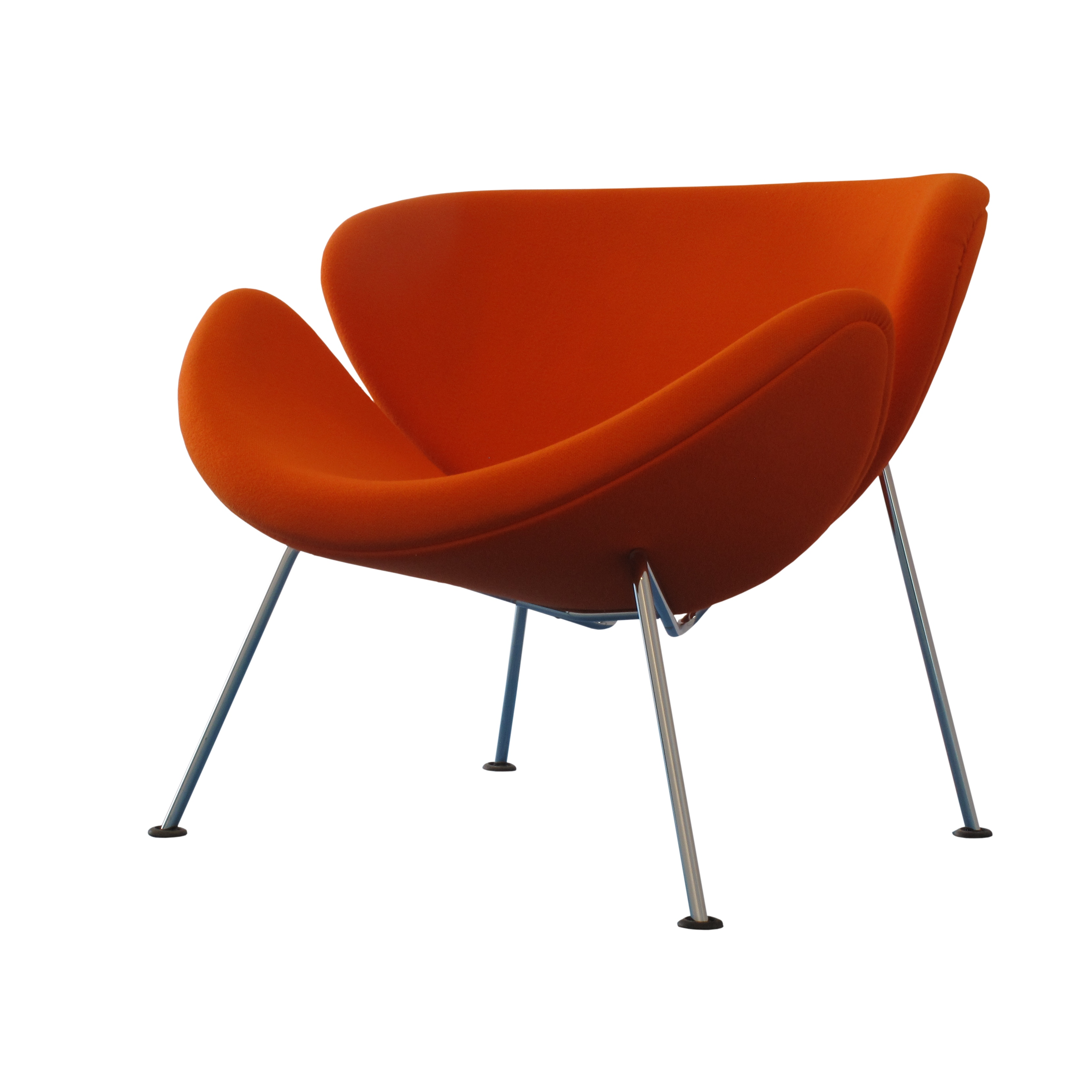
Orange Slice chair

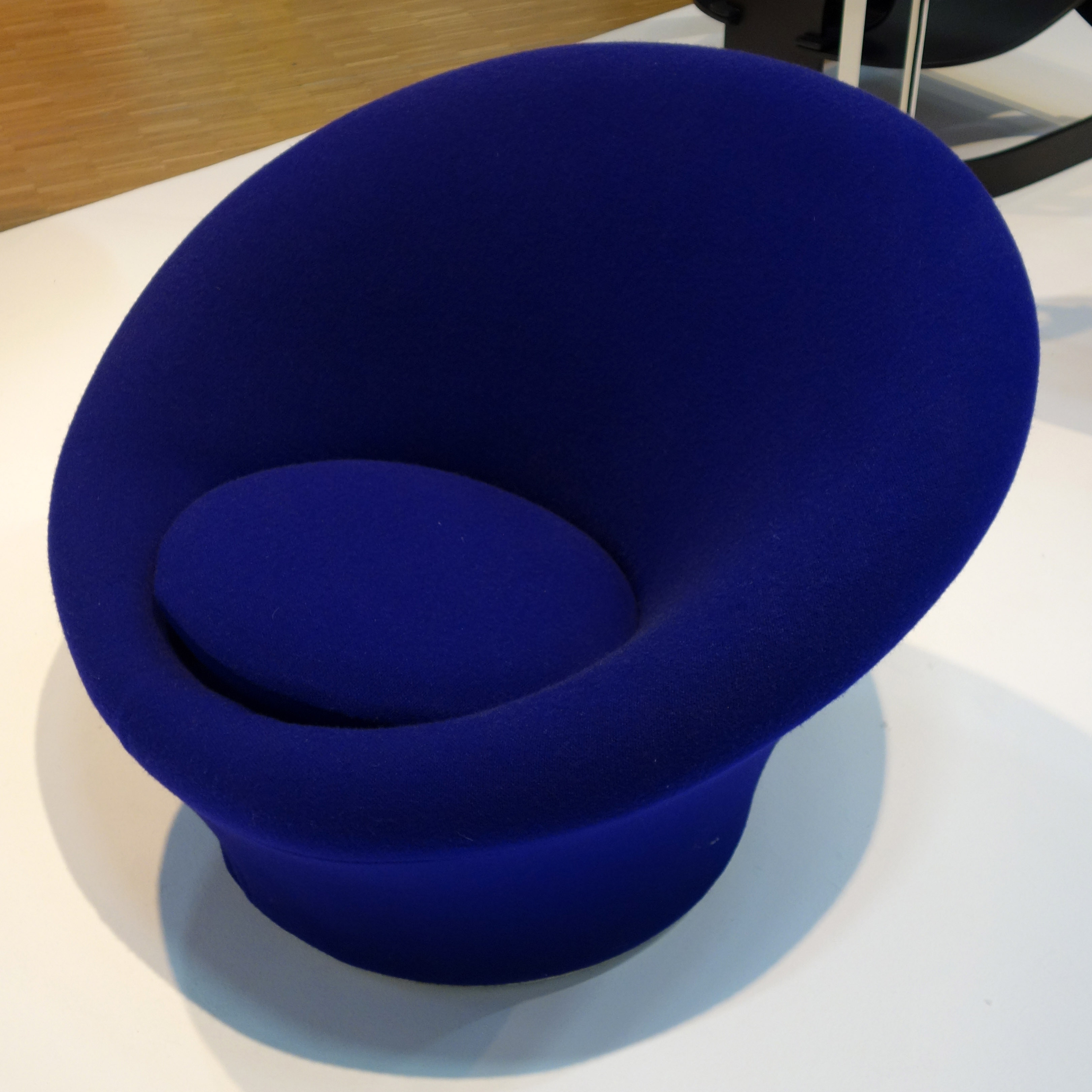
Mushroom chair

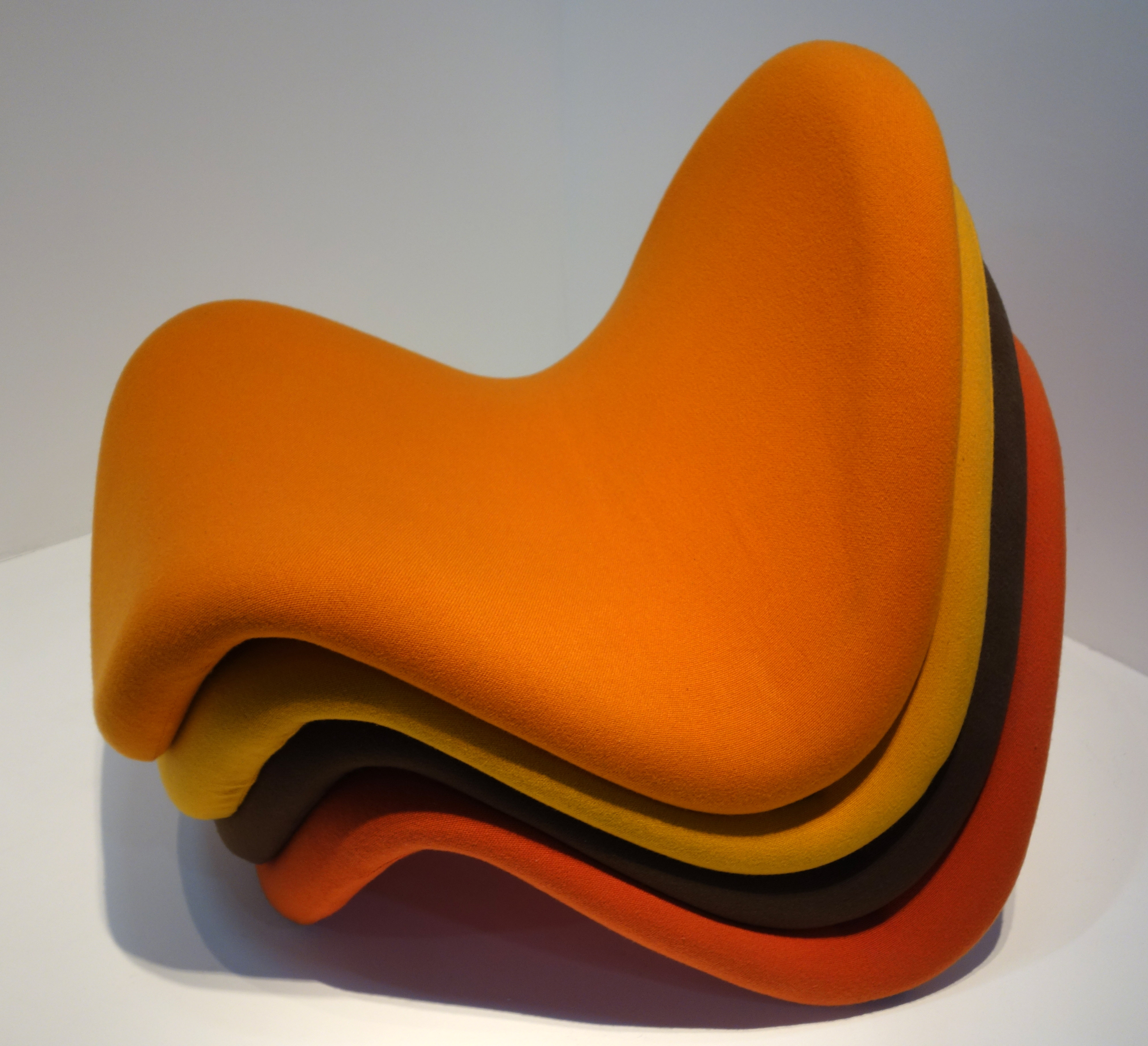
Tongue chair

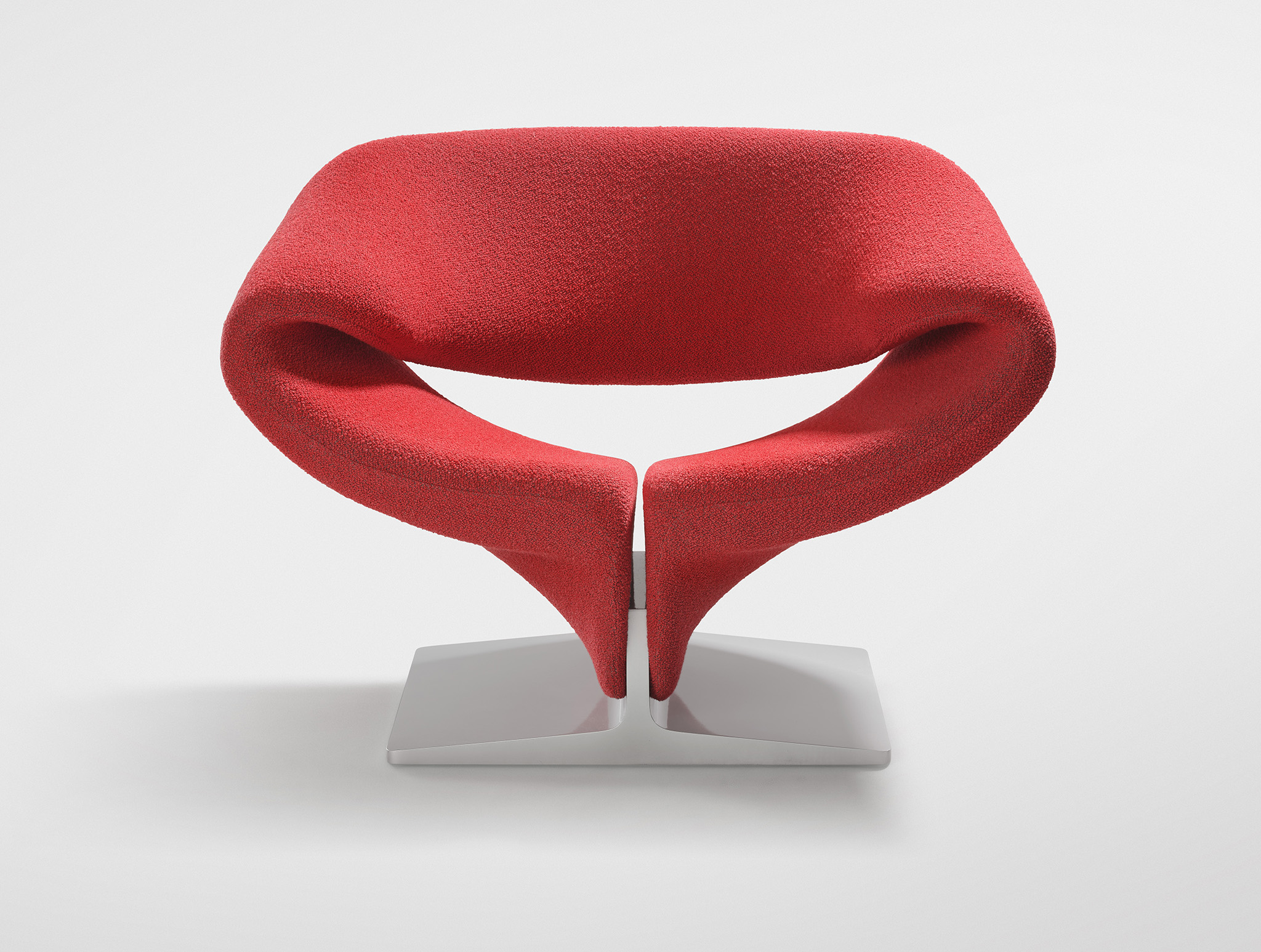
Ribbon chair

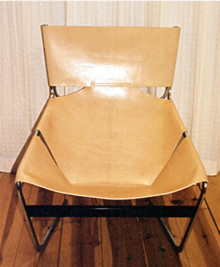
Artifort F644

=== Famous designs ===
Paulin was most famous for his innovative designs during the 1960s, when he worked for Artifort. His most famous chair designs were the Mushroom chair (1959), Ribbon chair (1966) and Tongue chair (1968).

== Interior design ==
Paulin was also highly influential during the 1970s. He was invited by the Mobilier National to decorate the private apartments of Georges Pompidou in the Élysée Palace (1971). He was invited back again in 1983 to furnish the office of François Mitterrand. Most of his iconic models were made in collaboration with the Atelier de Recherche et de création – Mobilier National.

He also redesigned the interiors of the Denon Wing of the Louvre museum, the hall of Tapestries in the Paris City Hall, the Economic and Social Council assembly room, the Green Room of the state radio's Broadcasting House ('Maison de la Radio'), the Nikko Hotel, among other places.
