= Artifort =

Dutch furniture manufacturer since 1890

- Company type: Privately held company
- Industry: Furniture
- Founded: 1890
- Founder: Jules Wagemans
- Defunct: 1998
- Headquarters: Schijndel, The Netherlands
- Products: Design furniture
- Owner: Lande Family
- Website: www.artifort.com

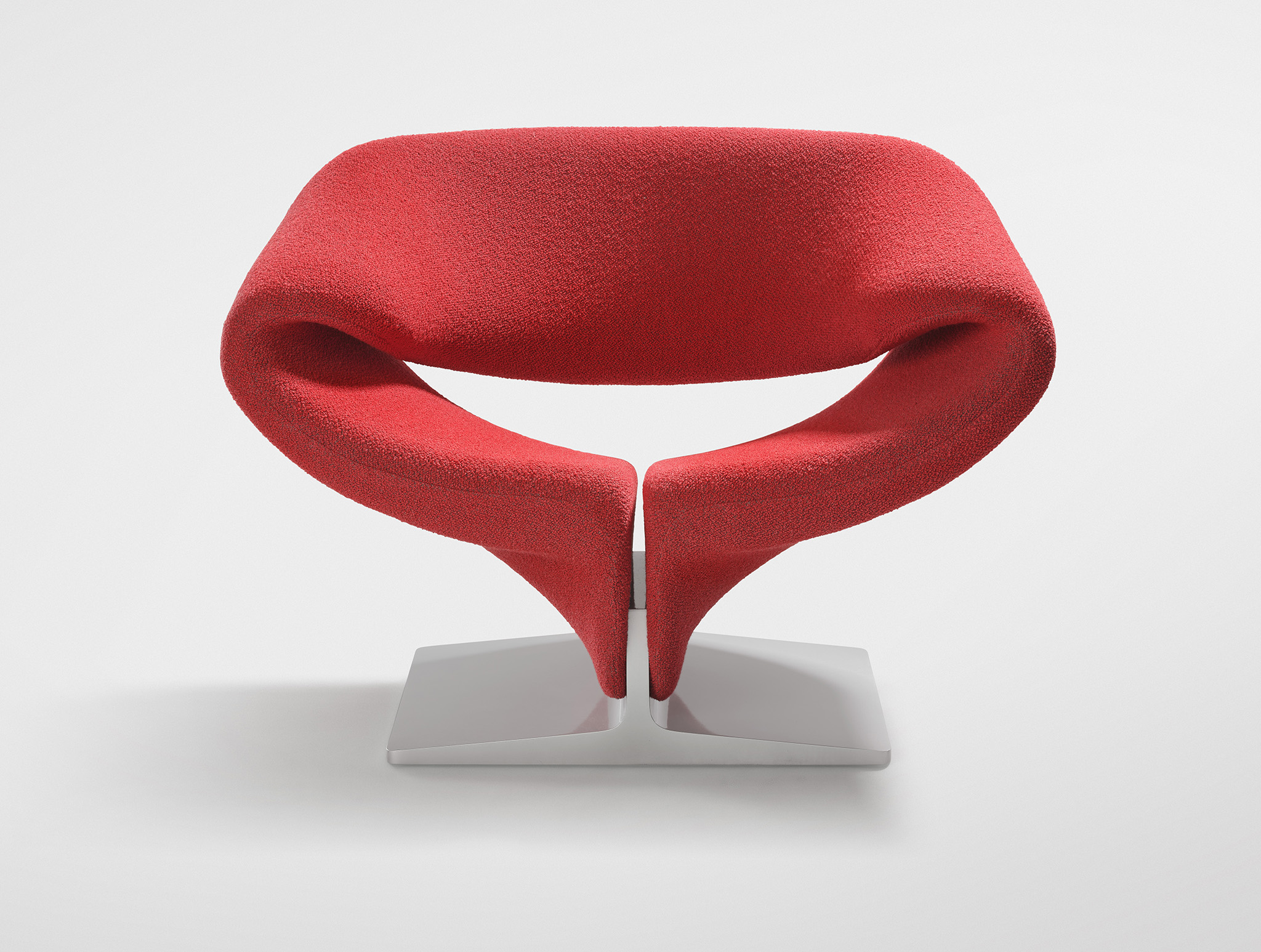
Model 582 Ribbon Chair by Pierre Paulin (1966)

Artifort is a design furniture manufacturer. It was founded in 1890 by Jules Wagemans in Maastricht, The Netherlands. Since 1998, Artifort is a Lande Group brand. The headquarters is located in Schijndel. The furniture is made in-house at the production-units in Schijndel, Lanaken, Belgium and Bursa, Turkey. Artifort furniture is known for its organic shapes, upholstery and is sold worldwide both in the contract and residential market.

== History ==
In 1890 Jules Wagemans set up his upholstery business in Maastricht. His son Henricus Wagemans built this company up to furniture manufacturer 'H. Wagemans & Van Tuinen'. In 1928, the brand name Artifort is introduced, which combines Art and Comfort. Artifort's breakthrough came in the 1930s when the company started to use Epeda interior springing. The springing is woven from one single steel wire which increases comfort, is more sustainable and saves production time.

Initially Artifort made classic wooden furniture. In the 1950s Artifort took its first step along the path of innovative design with the Pinguïn and Congo chair designed by Theo Ruth. In 1958 Kho Liang Ie was appointed as aesthetic consultant. His vision, expertise and international network were determining factors in the successes of the 1960s and 1970s. Kho Liang Ie designs the new Artifort logo and recruits designers Pierre Paulin and Geoffrey D. Harcourt. Pierre Paulin introduces new production techniques and uses brightly colored stretch fabric to upholster the organic shapes of his designs. Paulin's focus lay primarily with the challenge of addressing functionality and comfort, most notably showcased with his Mushroom chair, developed for Artifort in 1959 and now in the permanent collection of the Museum of Modern Art in New York. Geoffrey Harcourt designs an extensive collection for the contract market that is very successful around the world.

In the 1970s and 1980s, Nel Verschuuren, Bruno Ninaber van Eyben, Gijs Bakker and Jeremy Harvey create designs for Artifort. In the 1990s Artifort continued to collaborate with international designers like Jasper Morrison, Wolfgang Mezger, René Holten and Jan Pesman.

In the 1990s, Artifort was acquired thrice. In 1990 by Steelcase Strafor, in 1994 by Samas and in 1998 by Lande Group. Today Artifort is still a Lande Family brand. In the 2000s and beyond, Artifort continued to collaborate with the next generation of international designers like Patrick Norguet and Claesson Koivisto Rune. In 2014 Artifort appointed designer Khodi Feiz as art-director to guide Artifort's designers.

== Designers and models ==
- Gerrit Thomas Rietveld | Zwaan | 1958
- Pierre Paulin | Mushroom | 1959
- Pierre Paulin | Tongue | 1963
- Pierre Paulin | Ribbon | 1966
- Jasper Morrison | Vega | 1997
- Studio Ilse | Perching | 2016
