= Najla El Zein =

Lebanese artist and designer

- Born: 1983; Beirut
- Alma mater: École Camondo
- Occupation: Artist, designer, visual artist
- Awards: Tamayouz Excellence Award
- Website: najlaelzein.com

Najla El Zein (born 1983) is a Lebanese-French artist and designer.

== Biography ==
Najla El Zein was born in Beirut, Lebanon in 1983 . She grew up in Paris, where she lived from 1985 to 2008. She studied at the Ecole Camondo, École Camondo earning degrees in Product Design and Interior Architecture. El Zein is currently based in Amsterdam, the Netherlands, where she lives and works.

El Zein's practice delves into the relationship between space and object, often exploring themes of transformation, emotional states, and the physicality of the body. Her work often takes the form of hand-sculpted pieces in natural materials such as stone, glass, clay, concrete, plaster.

Rooted in craftsmanship and shaped by an intuitive creative process, El Zein's work blends the notion of space and functionality with narrative and emotional depth. She is known for producing sculptural pieces that invite tactile engagement and often explore intimacy, identity, vulnerability, and human connection. Her practice emphasizes the journey of the making process, where human relations, craftsmanship, time, narrative and emotions are all interconnected, each element influencing and supporting the others. El Zein inscribes herself within the slow design movement, valuing a holistic and thoughtful approach to the process of creation. She emphasizes the importance of time, intention, and the deeper connections between design, making, and materials.

In 2013 she was commissioned by the London Design Festival to create an installation in the Victoria and Albert Museum. The resulting piece, called Wind Portal, which was a composition of 5,000 spinning paper windmills, was displayed in the Daylit Gallery.

In 2022 El Zein completed Us, Her, Him, a major permanent public installation in Doha, commissioned by Qatar Museums Authority. The work was awarded the Dia-Al-Azzawi Prize for Public Art in 2024, in recognition of its exceptional craftsmanship and contribution to the public realm.

Following the 2020 Beirut explosion, El Zein produced a series of sculptural pieces titled 6.07, the name being a reference to the time of the blast. The proceeds from the sale of the pieces were donated to local NGO called Beb w’ Shebbek, Beit el Baraka, Beirut heritage initiative.

Her work has been exhibited internationally and acquired by the Victoria and Albert Museum, London, and the Dallas Museum of Art, TX. Her work was also included in the exhibition Mirror Mirror: Reflections on Design at Chatsworth at Chatsworth House in the United Kingdom, and The New Transcendence at Freidman Benda gallery in New York (both curated by Glenn Adamson).

She has studios in Amsterdam and Beirut.
