= Khodi Feiz =

American designer

- Born: 1963 (age 62–63); Iran
- Occupation: Industrial Designer
- Website: https://feizdesign.com/

Khodi Feiz (born 1963) is an industrial designer specialized in the fields of product design, furniture design, branding and strategic design.

== Biography ==
Khodi (Khodayar) Feiz (1963) was born in Iran and moved to the United States at the age of 14. Feiz studied Industrial Design at Syracuse University where his thesis project was a winner of the International Design Competition, Osaka in 1987. After graduation he worked for Texas Instruments Design Center and in 1990 moved to The Netherlands to work for Philips Design. At Philips Feiz was appointed project leader for Philips' Vision of the Future in 1996. In 1998, he founded Feiz Design Studio together with graphic designer Anneko Feiz-van Dorssen, where they specialize in the fields of product design, furniture design, and strategic design for multi-national companies such as Alessi, Artifort, Cappellini, Herman Miller, Logitech, Nokia, Offecct, Philips, Samsung and Swedese. In 2003 Feiz' work was presented in a solo exhibition at Vivid Gallery, Rotterdam. In 2014 Feiz was appointed as the art director for the Dutch furniture brand Artifort. The overriding inspirations for Feiz’s work can be summed up by: Clarity, concept and context.

== Awards and exhibitions ==
=== Awards ===
- 2019: IDEA Award, Cesto for StudioTK
- 2017: Red Dot Award, Best of the best, IDSA Gold 2017, iF Product Design Award 2017, Logitech K780 Keyboard
- 2016: Red Dot Award, Logitech K380 Multi-device Keyboard
- 2015: Red Dot Award, Logitech K480 Multi-device Keyboard
- 2014: Red Dot Award, Huawei Mediapad M1 Tablet
- 2012: IDEA Award, Offecct Moment, Easy Chair
- 2012: Red Dot Award and IDEA Award, Denon Cocoon, Wireless Speaker
- 2012: Good design, Geiger Deft, Seating Collection
- 2010: Red Dot Award, IDEA, ID Annual Design Review, Giannina family, Set of coffee products
- 2009: Toy of the Year Award 2009, Swinxs, Childrens Educational Toy
- 2009: ID Annual Design Review, Palma, Easy Chair
- 2008: ID Annual Design Review, Peel seating, Convertible Furniture
- 2008: ID Annual Design Review, Red Dot Award, Nokia md-6, Portable Speaker
- 2008: Red Dot Award, IF Design Award, Nokia md-7, Portable Speaker
- 2006: Dutch Design Award, Grolsch beer glasses
- 2003: Dutch Design Award, Lost Boys Program
- 2003: Dutch Design Awards, Alessi desk objects
- 2000: International Young Designers Award, Finalist, Design Report
- 1999-2000: World Technology Award for Design, Finalist
- 1987: International Design Competition, Award Winner, Osaka, Integrated Scuba Helmet (Student project)

=== Exhibitions ===
- 2007: Salone del Mobile, Milano, Solo Exhibition "Light Green"
- 2003: Vivid Gallery, Rotterdam, Solo Exhibition
- 2001: Salone del Mobile, Salone Satellite, Milano, Solo Exhibition
- 2000: Salone del Mobile, Salone Satellite, Milano, Solo Exhibition

== Notable Products ==
- 2020: Level, Invisible Smart Lock
- 2019: StudioTK, Cesto Interactive Seating and Table elements
- 2019: Swedese, Amstelle Chair and Poufs
- 2018: Artifort, Figura Sofa
- 2017: Artifort, Extens 2.0 Cabinets
- 2016: Logitech, K780 Multi-device Keyboard (in collaboration with Logitech Design)
- 2016: Artifort, Niloo Easy Chair
- 2016: Artifort, Beso Chair Program
- 2014: Denon, Envaya Bluetooth Speaker
- 2014: Artifort, Bras Sofa
- 2012: Offecct, Moment Easy Chair
- 2009: Giannini, Giannina Family
- 2008: Swinxs
- 2008: Offecct, Palma
- 2007: Tak Floor and Table Lamp
- 2007: Bras EPS, Perf Family, Plana, System24
- 2005: Nokia N70 smartphone (in collaboration with Nokia Design)
- 2001: Alessi Desk Objects
- 2000: Alessi Salsa bowl
- 2000: Cappellini, Noor lamps
