= Afshin Feiz =

British fashion designer

Afshin Feiz is an Iranian born, British photographer and ex fashion designer based in London. His collections have been featured at the Olympus Fashion Week and have appeared at London Fashion Week at least three times. He debuted his 2009 Spring/Summer collection at the Royal Academy.

== Background ==
British designer Afshin Feiz moved to Paris originally to attend the avant-garde fashion school, Studio Berçot. He grew up all over the world, mostly in England where he attended Cranleigh School in Surrey, and then in Vancouver, BC, Canada. He studied French Literature at Reed College in Portland, Oregon in the United States before moving to Paris. Feiz interned at Thierry Mugler and John Galliano after school before moving on to Christian Lacroix Haute Couture. Next came a year as Director of The Design Studio at Gilles Rosier, before ending up three years at Nina Ricci as the First Assistant Designer for the main line and Coordinator of all the Licences.

Feiz started showing immediately at New York Fashion Week for a few seasons before showing at London Fashion Week starting with his Spring 2008 Collection. His first season at Paris Couture Week was Spring 2010. Collaborations have come in the form of his Spring/Summer 2005 Catalogue being shot by his friend, rockstar/photographer Bryan Adams, his Autumn/Winter 2005 Show Invitation being illustrated by Psychedelic Furs frontman Richard Butler, and a song being written and recorded for that same show by LA Music Producer (for Alanis Morissette, Elvis Costelloe and The Red Hot Chili Peppers), Jimmy Boyle. The Brand New Heavies performed at his Spring 2007 show in New York. Very well received by the Press, Feiz's clothes are featured in Cosmopolitan, Harper's Bazaar, British Vogue, Teen Vogue and Paris Match among other magazines and have been worn by celebrities such as Katie Holmes, Elizabeth Hurley, Beyoncé, Julia Stiles, Paris Hilton and Girls Aloud.
