= Robert Couturier (architect) =

French architect and decorator

Robert Couturier (born 1955) is a French architect and decorator best known for designing Cuixmala, formerly the estate of British-French billionaire Sir James Goldsmith.

== Biography ==
Robert Couturier is a graduate of the École Camondo in Paris. He moved to New York in 1981. In 1987, Sir James Goldsmith commissioned Couturier to re-conceptualize his 30,000-acre nature reserve on the Pacific Coast of Mexico. Couturier went on to decorate Goldsmith's Boeing 757, his double-width Manhattan townhouse, and his historic French chateau.

Couturier has worked with clients such as Anne Hearst and Jay McInerney, Frederick Iseman, and Frédéric Fekkai. In June 2012, Elle Decor included Couturier in its "A-list Top 60 Designers", while the British magazine House and Garden named him one of the top 10 foreign decorators. He also collects furniture and art including pieces by Ingrid Donat.

In October, 2014, he released the book, Robert Couturier: Designing Paradises. In 2021, Architectural Digest inducted Couturier into the AD100 Hall of Fame. While he once lived in Connecticut with his partner Jeffrey Morgan, he now lives in New York City.
