= Giovanni Guaita =

21st-century Russian Orthodox priest

Hieromonk Giovanni Guaita
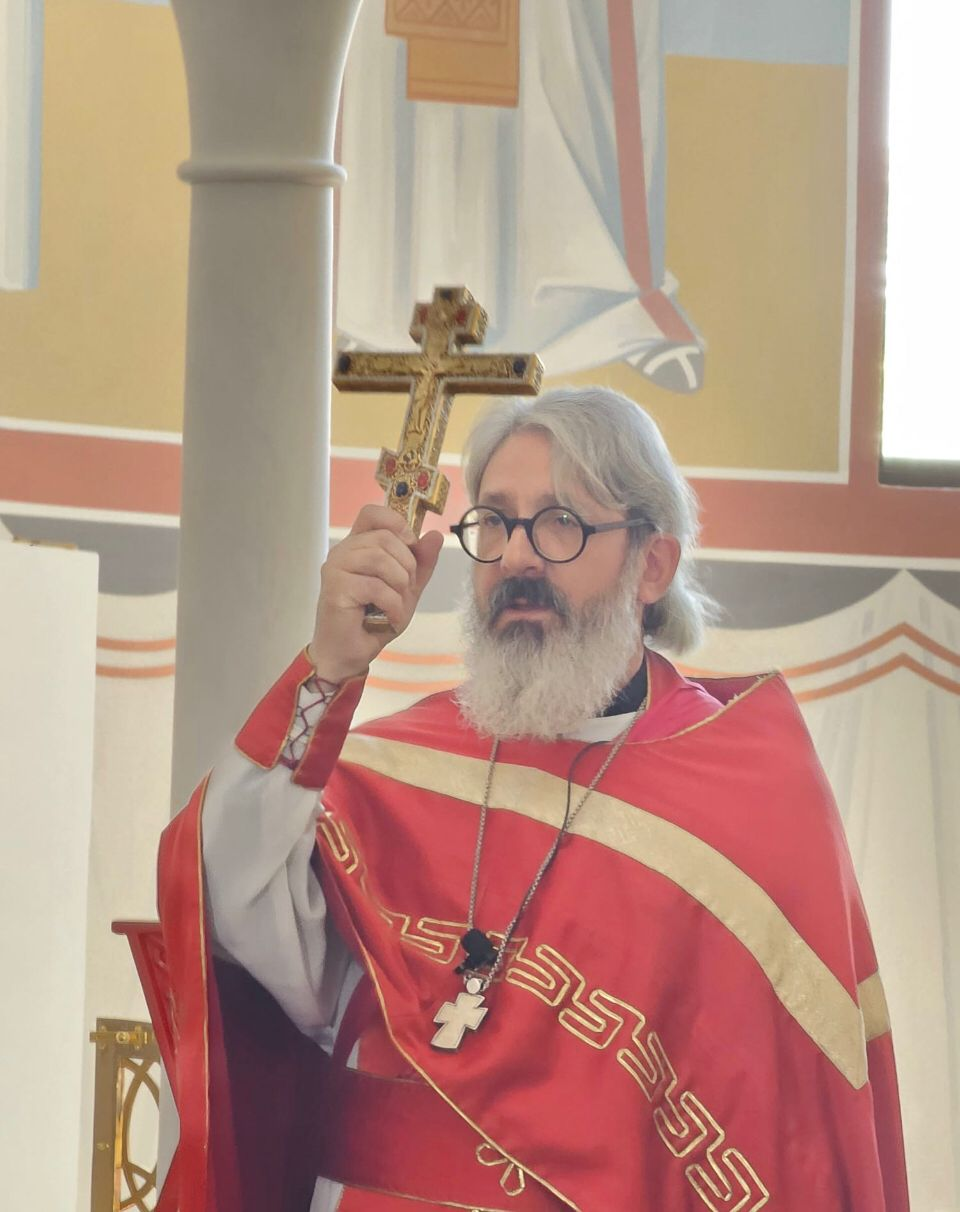
- Guaita in 2024
- Church: Russian Orthodox Church
- See: France
- Installed: 28 March 2010
- Term ended: Incumbent

Orders
- Rank: priestmonk

Personal details
- Born: Giovanni Guaita; 26 November 1962 (age 63) Iglesias, Sardinia, Italy
- Profession: Cleric, teacher, writer, historian, theologian, translator
- Education: University of Geneva; Saint Petersburg Theological Academy

Hieromonk John (Russian: Иеромонах Иоанн, secular name Giovanni Guaita, Italian: Giovanni Guaita; born 26 November 1962) is a cleric of the Russian Orthodox Church of Italian origin. He holds a Candidate of Theology degree.

As a scholar, Guaita has published several works on Eastern Christianity and history of Armenia, as well as the "Wordbook on Orthodox Hagiology".

== Biography ==
Giovanni Guaita was born on 26 November 1962, in the town of Iglesias, Sardinia, Italy, into a Catholic family. His mother was a mathematician and his father a physician who served for a time as a minister. After primary school, he attended a classical lyceum. At the age of 18, he left for Switzerland.

He graduated from the Faculty of Theology at the University of Geneva. In 1985, he visited the Soviet Union for a two-month internship in Leningrad (present-day Saint Petersburg). Between 1986 and 1987, he was again in the Soviet Union for a traineeship at the Pushkin Institute in Moscow. In 1987, he met Protopriest Alexander Men, after which he developed a serious interest in Eastern Orthodoxy. From 1989 onward, he lived in Russia, where he studied at the Saint Petersburg Theological Academy.

While living in Russia from 1989 to 2010, he taught secular and theological subjects at several universities in Moscow, including the Moscow State University, the Moscow State Linguistic University, and the Russian State University for the Humanities. He worked on translations, including of theological texts, and wrote his diploma work on Andrei Tarkovsky at the Gerasimov Institute of Cinematography.

In April 2009, he was employed by the Department for External Church Relations of the Moscow Patriarchate, where he worked as at the Secretariat for Inter-Christian Relations.

On 28 March 2010, at the Church of the Icon of the Mother of God "Joy of All Who Sorrow" on Bolshaya Ordynka Street in Moscow, he was ordained as a deacon by Metropolitan Hilarion Alfeyev. On 11 September 2010, at the Church of the Beheading of St. John the Baptist on Chernigov Lane, he was ordained as a presbyter by Metropolitan Hilarion Alfeyev.

On 31 October 2010, at the Old Katholikon of the Trinity Lavra, he took monastic vows. The newly tonsured monk was given the name John in honor of John the Baptist (his baptismal name was in honor of John the Apostle).

On 30 May 2014, he was released from his duties as a staff member at the Department for External Church Relations of the Moscow Patriarchate and as a supernumerary cleric of the Church of the Icon of the Mother of God "Joy of All Who Sorrow", and was appointed a full-time priest of the Church of Saints Cosmas and Damian on the Stoleshnikov Lane.

On 27 July 2019, he assisted participants of protests on Tverskaya Street who sought refuge in the courtyard of the church, where he conducted a brief prayer service for peace. On 18 September of the same year, he signed an open letter from priests in defense of the defendants in the Moscow Case.

In 2022, following the Russian invasion of Ukraine, Guaita signed the appeal of the Clergy of the Russian Orthodox Church for Reconciliation and an End to War.

Since 1 February 2024, he has served at the Church of the Transfiguration of the Lord in Estepona, Spain. On 19 November 2024, by decree of the Patriarchal Exarch of Western Europe, Metropolitan Nestor Sirotenko of Chersonesus and Western Europe, he was enrolled into the staff of the clergy of the Holy Trinity Cathedral in Paris, France.
