= John Roshchin =

Bishop of the Russian Orthodox Church

Metropolitan John
- Metropolitan of Vienna and Budapest
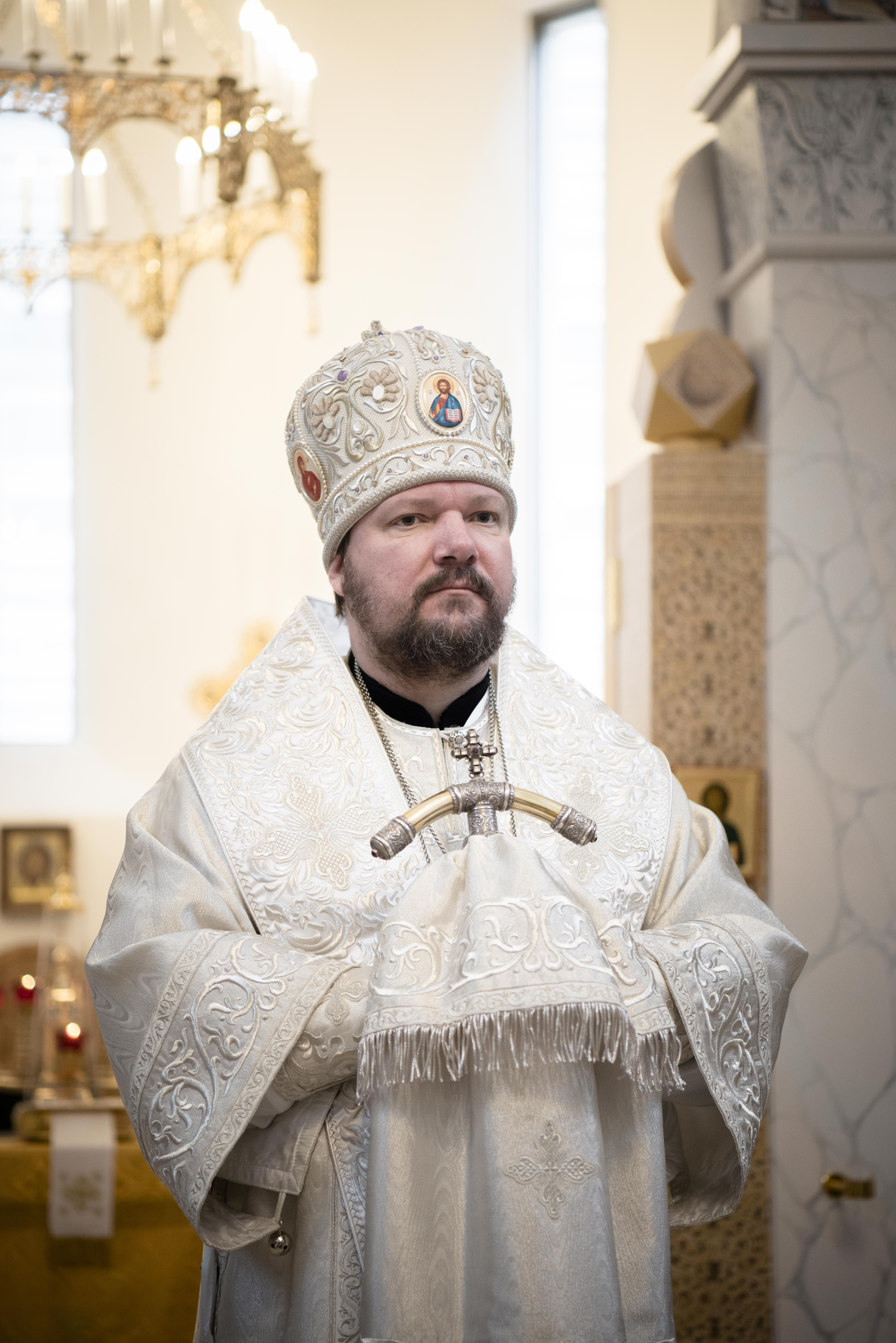
- Native name: Иоанн
- Church: Russian Orthodox Church
- Metropolis: Vienna and Budapest
- Diocese: Diocese of Vienna and Budapest
- Appointed: 25 July 2014: administrator of the Patriarchal Parishes in the USA; 28 December 2018: primate of the PEWE and of the Diocese of Chersonesus; 30 May 2019: primate of the diocese of Vienna and Budapest
- Predecessor: Administrator of the Patriarchal Parishes in the USA: Justinian (Ovchinnikov); Bishop of Chersonesus: Nestor (Sirotenko); Metropolitan of Chersonesus and Western Europe: office established
- Successor: Administrator of the Patriarchal Parishes in the USA: Matthew of Sourozh (temporary administrator since 14 October 2018); Metropolitan of Chersonesus and Western Europe: Anthony (Sevryuk)
- Previous posts: Administrator of the Patriarchal Parishes in the USA; Metropolitan of Chersonesus and Western Europe

Orders
- Ordination: 28 August 2007 (deacon) by Metropolitan Kirill of Smolensk and Kaliningrad
- Rank: Metropolitan

Personal details
- Born: Georgy Yevgenyevich Roshchin; 22 October 1974 (age 51) Moscow, Soviet Union
- Denomination: Eastern Orthodox Church
- Education: Moscow Theological Seminary

Metropolitan John (secular name Georgy Yevgenyevich Roshchin, Russian: Георгий Евгеньевич Рощин; 22 October 1974) is a retired metropolitan bishop of the Russian Orthodox Church.

From 2014 to 2018, he served as the U.S.-based titular bishop of Naro-Fominsk, vicar of the Patriarch of Moscow and all Russia. Metropolitan John is also the former administrator of the Patriarchal Parishes in the USA.

== Biography ==
=== Early life ===
In 1991, he graduated from Secondary School No. 4 in Moscow, studying the English language. From 1991 to 1993, he studied law at the Sholokhov Moscow State University for Humanities. During the same period, he served as an altar boy at the Church of the Life-Giving Trinity on Sparrow Hills.

From 1993 to 1994, he held duties at the Pskov-Caves Monastery. From 1994 to 1997, he studied at the Moscow Theological Seminary. During seminary training, he served as the guide of the church archaeological cabinet at the Moscow Theological Academy and Seminary. In 1996 and 1997, he worked as a staff member of the Publishing Council of the Russian Orthodox Church, specializing in drafting liturgical guidelines. In 1997, he was appointed the Secretariat for Inter-Christian Relations of the Moscow Patriarchate's Synodal Department for External Church Affairs.

In December 1998, he was a member of the Moscow Patriarchate's delegation at the Eighth Assembly of the World Council of Churches in Harare, Zimbabwe, and was elected to the WCC Central Committee. From 1999 to 2000, he studied at Saint Vladimir's Orthodox Theological Seminary in Crestwood, New York. From 2000 to 2002, he studied at the Faculty of Philosophy at the Catholic University of America in Washington, DC.

From 2003 to 2009, as a member of the Secretariat on Church and Society of the Synodal Department for External Church Relations, he was in charge of inter-religious communication, including interaction with the Inter-religious Council of Russia, the SNG Inter-religious Council, and international interfaith organizations. As a member of the "Islam in Europe" Commission of the Conference of European Churches, he participated in preparing and conducting the fourth, fifth, and sixth Meetings of the Russian-Iranian "Islam-Orthodoxy" joint commission.

=== Ordination ===
On 28 August 2007, Metropolitan Kirill of Smolensk and Kaliningrad (the present Patriarch of Moscow and all Russia) ordained Roshchin as a deacon; on 23 September, Kirill ordained him a priest. On 27 July 2009, the Holy Synod appointed him Deputy Chairman of the Moscow Patriarchate Synodal Department for the Coordination of Church and Society.

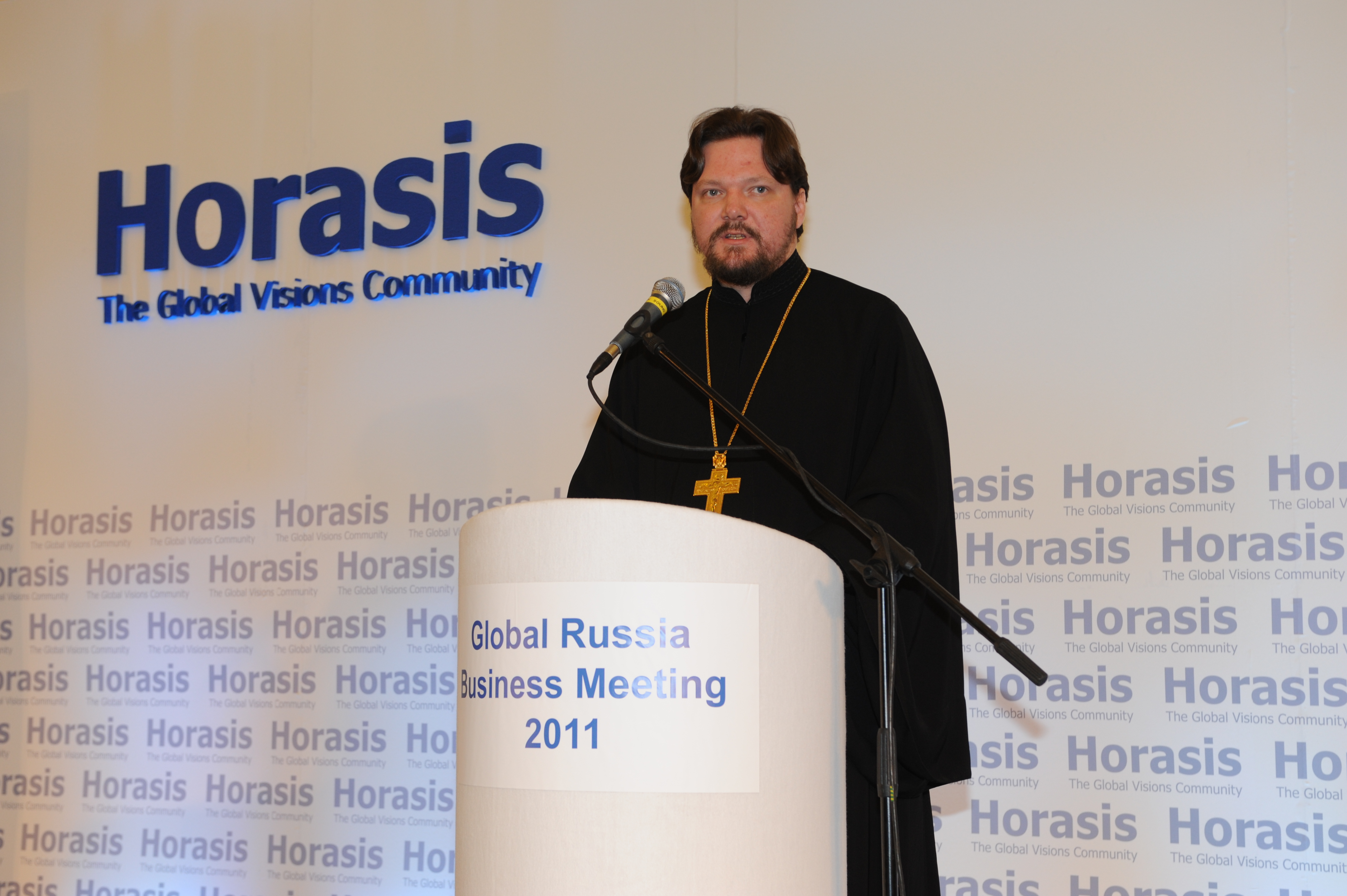
Roshchin in 2011

In 2009, with the blessing of Patriarch Kirill of Moscow and the all Rus, he was a member of the Council for the Study of Religious Materials to identify extremist materials in the Ministry of Justice. He was the official representative of the Moscow Patriarchate in the Parliamentary Assembly of the Union of Belarus and Russia, a member of the commission on organizing state support and the development of original Cossack culture, a member of the Public Council under the Federal Drug Control Service, and a member of the Public Council under Rosreyestr.

From 2010 to 2013, he was the executive secretary of the Inter-religious Council of the Commonwealth of Independent States. On 19 April 2011, in the cathedral church of the Descent of the Holy Spirit of the stauropegial Conception Convent in Moscow, he was elevated to the rank of archpriest by the Patriarch Kirill of Moscow and all Russia. On 4 October 2012, the Holy Synod appointed him representative of the World Russian People's Council at the United Nations and assigned him to St. Nicholas Cathedral in New York City.

On 11 March 2014, with the blessing of Patriarch Kirill of Moscow and all Rus', the Superior of the Trinity Lavra of St. Sergius, Archbishop Theognost of Sergiev Posad, tonsured him a monk with the name John in honor of St. John (Maximovitch) of Shanghai and San Francisco. A Holy Synod decision, on 25 July 2014, appointed him as Administrator of the Patriarchal Parishes in the US and vicar bishop of the Diocese of Moscow with the title of bishop of Naro-Fominsk. On 28 July 2014, Patriarch Kirill of Moscow and all Russia, at the Liturgy in the Cathedral of Christ the Savior, elevated him to the rank of archimandrite. On 1 August 2014, in the Church of George the Great Martyr at Poklonnaya Hill during the Divine Liturgy, the Episcopal Consecration of Archimandrite John (Roshchin) as Bishop of Naro-Fominsk was performed by Patriarch Kirill of Moscow and all Russia, Metropolitan Juvenaly (Poyarkov) of Krutisty and Kolomna, Metropolitan Hilarion (Alfeyev) of Volokolamsk, Archbishop Mark (Golovkov) of Yegorievsk, Bishop Sergius (Chashin) of Solnechnogorsk.

=== Primate of the Patriarchal Exarchate in Western Europe (PEWE) ===
On 15 October 2018, the Holy Synod of the Russian Orthodox Church appointed him Bishop of Bogorodsk, in charge of the parishes of the Russian Orthodox Church in Italy. "On December 28, 2018, the Holy Synod appointed him as the primate of the Western Europe Exarchate, with the title 'of Chersonesus and Western Europe,' he was also simultaneously appointed as the primate of the diocese of Chersonesus. He temporarily continue[d] to administer the parishes in Italy."

"January 3, 2019: Patriarch Kirill elevated him to the dignity of metropolitan at the Kremlin Dormition Cathedral in Moscow during the Divine Liturgy for the feast of Saint Peter, Metropolitan of Moscow." Nestor (Sirotenko) [ru] was previously the primate of the diocese of Chersonesus, but he was replaced by John (Roshchin) by the Holy Synod on 28 December 2018.

=== Metropolitan of Vienna and Budapest ===
On 30 May 2019, the Holy Synod of the ROC appointed Archbishop Anthony (Sevryuk) of Vienna and Budapest as primate of the PEWE and of the diocese of Chersonesus. At the same time, John (Roshchin), who was until then the primate of the PEWE and of the diocese of Chersonesus, was appointed as primate of the ROC Diocese of Vienna and Diocese of Budapest to replace Archbishop Anthony. In the same decision, Bishop Ambrose of Neftekamsk was appointed Bishop of Bogorodsk.

On 30 August 2019, by the decision of the Holy Synod of the ROC, he was released from the administration of the Diocese of Budapest and Hungaria with a change of title to "of Vienna and Austria".

On 11 March 2020, by the decision of the Holy Synod of the ROC, he was retired with his residence in Moscow.

Eastern Orthodox Church titles
Preceded by Justinian (Ovchinnikov)	Administrator of the Patriarchal Parishes in the USA (Patriarchal Parishes in the USA); 25 July 2014 – 28 December 2018	Succeeded by Matthew (Andreyev) (locum tenens)
Preceded by Anthony (Sevryuk) (locum tenens)	Bishop of Bogorodsk (Parishes of the Russian Orthodox Church in Italy); 18 October 2018 – 28 December 2018	Succeeded by Himself (locum tenens) then Ambrose (Munteanu) (since 30 May 2019)
Preceded by Nestor (Sirotenko)	Bishop of Chersonesus (Diocese of Chersonesus, Patriarchal Exarchate in Western Europe); 28 December 2018 – 30 May 2019	Succeeded by Anthony (Sevryuk)
Preceded by Position established	Metropolitan of Chersonesus and Western Europe (Patriarchal Exarchate in Western Europe); 28 December 2018 – 30 May 2019	Succeeded by Anthony (Sevryuk)
Preceded by Anthony (Sevryuk)	Metropolitan of Vienna and Budapest; 30 May 2019–11 March 2020	Succeeded by Incumbent
