= Diocese of Vienna and Austria =

Russian Orthodox Jurisdiction in Austria

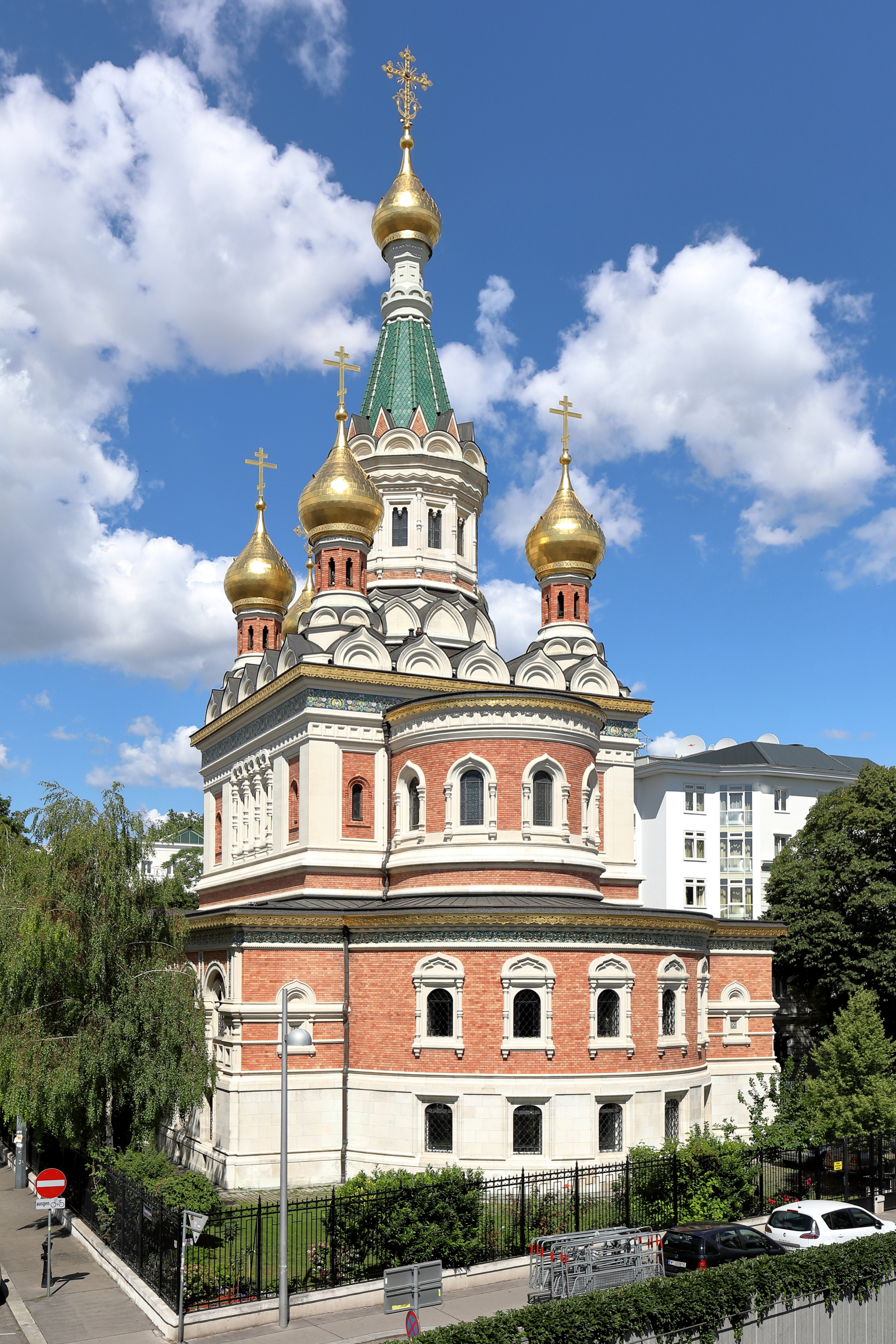
The Viennese church is the current main cathedral and seat of the bishop

Diocese of Vienna and Austria (Russian: Венская и Австрийская епархия, German: Wiener und Österreichische Diözese / Diözese für Wien und Österreich) is an eparchy of the Russian Orthodox Church. It unites parishes in Austria. The diocese exists alongside the Austrian parishes of the Berlin and German Diocese of ROCOR.

The current diocesan bishop is Aleksij (Zanochkin), his title being His Grace, Aleksij, bishop of Vienna and Austria.

== History ==
On June 7, 1946, Archbishop Sergius (Korolyov) was appointed Archbishop of Vienna, vicar of the Patriarchal exarch in Western Europe with residence in Vienna. On October 21 of the same year, Archbishop Sergius was confirmed Exarch of Central Europe as diocesan bishop of Vienna. In 1948 he was transferred to Berlin, and Diocese of Vienna was ceased.

In 1951, a deanery was established in Vienna, and in 1962 it was transformed into a diocese. Bishop Herman (Timofeyev) (1970–1974) blessed the recitation of parts of the Divine Liturgy and sermons in German language.

By the decision of the Holy Synod of June 11, 1993, the parish in the city of Graz, which had passed from the jurisdiction of the Russian Orthodox Church Outside Russia, was included to the diocese.

During his tenure at the department of Bishop Paul (Ponomaryov) (1999–2003), the Orthodox deanery in Hungary also came under his jurisdiction, which was transformed on April 20, 2000, into an independent Diocese of Budapest, with Bishop Paul receiving the title of "Vienna and Budapest" and managing both dioceses.

The next bishop, Hilarion (Alfeyev), is again titled "Bishop of Vienna and Austria", being also the interim administrator of the Diocese of Budapest. The expansion of the diocese's activities to new parishes dates back to the 2000s - since May 2004, the Intercession Parish in Graz has received permanent pastoral care, since June of the same year — the parish in Linz, in 2005 it was planned to resume regular divine services in the St Lazarus cemetery church.

As 2000s the parishioners of the diocese belong to different nationalities — including Russians, Ukrainians, Belarusians, Moldovans, native Austrians, as well as Georgians. Divine liturgies in the parishes of the diocese are mostly celebrated in Church Slavic and sometimes in German.

On March 7, 2012, the Austrian authorities officially approved the legal status of the Diocese.

== Ruling hierarchs ==
- Sergius (Korolyov) (June 7, 1946 — November 17, 1948)
- Philaret (Denisenko) (November 16, 1962 — December 22, 1964)
- Bartholomew (Gondarovsky) (December 22, 1964 — July 7, 1966)
- Jonathan (Kopolovich) (July 7, 1966 — October 7, 1967) locum tenens
- Melchizedek (Lebedev) (October 7, 1967 — June 25, 1970)
- Herman (Timofeyev) (June 25, 1970 — September 3, 1974)
- Victorin (Belyaev) (September 3, 1974 — March 13, 1975)
- Irenaeus (Susemihl) (March 13, 1975 — July 26, 1999)
- Paul (Ponomarev) (December 28, 1999 — May 7, 2003)
- Hilarion (Alfeyev) (May 7, 2003 — March 31, 2009)
- Mark (Golovkov) (March 31, 2009 — October 22, 2015) locum tenens
- Tikhon (Zaitsev) (October 22, 2015 — December 28, 2017) locum tenens
- Anthony (Sevryuk) (December 28, 2017 — May 30, 2019)
- John (Roshchin) (May 30, 2019 — March 14, 2020)
- Alexius (Zanochkin) (from March 14, 2020) locum tenens until October 13, 2022

== Parishes ==
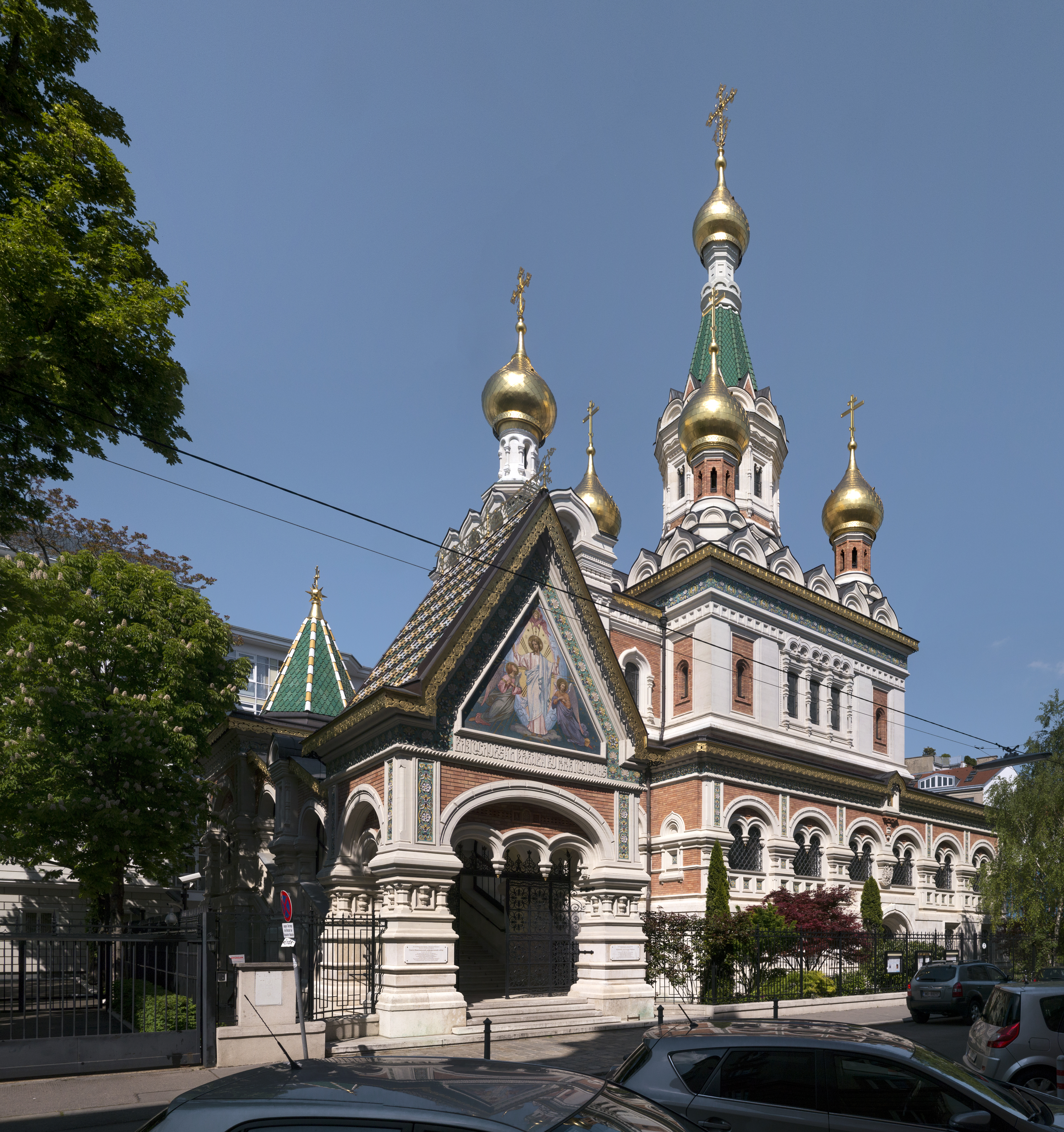
St. Nicholas Cathedral in Vienna

- St. Nicholas Cathedral, Vienna
- Church of St. Lazarus of the Fourth Day at Central Cemetery, Vienna
- Parish of the Intercession of the Blessed Virgin Mary, Graz
- Parish of the Intercession of the Blessed Virgin Mary, Innsbruck
- Church of the Holy Archangel Michael, Laa an der Thaya
- Parish of the Holy New Martyrs and Confessors of Russia, Linz
- Community of St. Hippolytus of Rome, Sankt Pölten
