= Anthony Sevryuk =

Russian bishop

- Chairman of the Department for External Church Relations of the Moscow Patriarchate
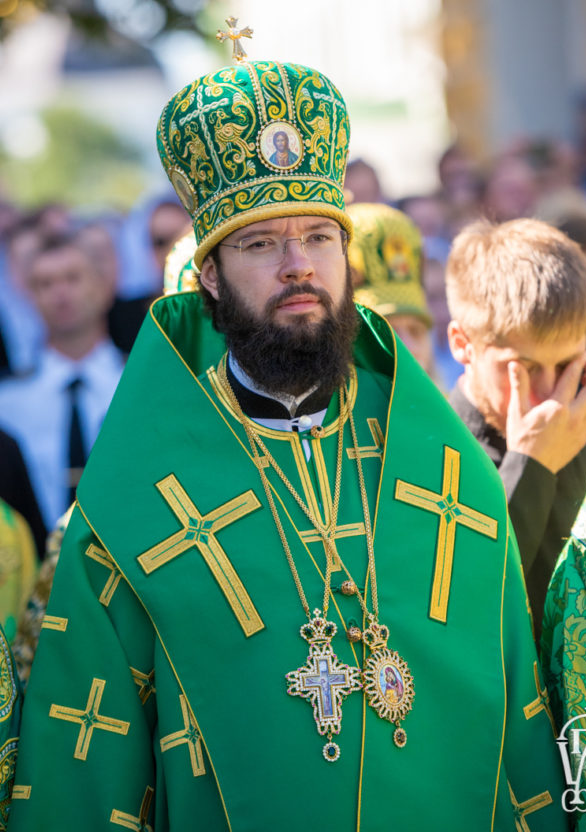
- Metropolitan Anthony in Kyiv in 2019
- Native name: Антоний
- Church: Russian Orthodox Church
- Appointed: 7 June 2022
- Predecessor: Hilarion Alfeyev
- Successor: Incumbent
- Other posts: Metropolitan of Volokolamsk, Vicar of the Patriarch of Moscow and All Russia
- Previous posts: Metropolitan of Chersonesus and Patriarchal Exarch of Western Europe (2019‍–‍2022); Bishop of Vienna and Austria (2017‍–‍2019); Bishop of Bogorodsk (2015‍–‍2017)

Orders
- Ordination: 5 March 2011 (deacon) by Patriarch Kirill (Gundyaev) of Moscow and All Rus', Metropolitan of Kaliningrad
- Rank: Metropolitan

Personal details
- Born: Anton Yuryevich Sevryuk; October 12, 1984 (age 41) Tver, Russian SFSR, Soviet Union
- Denomination: Eastern Orthodox Church

Metropolitan Anthony (Russian: Митрополит Антоний, secular name Anton Yuryevich Sevryuk, Russian: Антон Юрьевич Севрюк; born 12 October 1984), is a prelate of the Russian Orthodox Church. Since June 2022, he has held the titles of Metropolitan of Volokolamsk and Chairman of the Department for External Church Relations of the Moscow Patriarchate.

== Early life ==
Sevryuk was baptised at the age of 11. From 1991 to 1995 he studied at Secondary School Number 19 in his home city of Tver. In 1995, he entered the Tver Lyceum.

In his youth, Sevryuk volunteered as an altar server at Holy Resurrection Cathedral in Tver.

== Academic studies ==
In 2002 he entered the St. Petersburg Theological Seminary. During his training he studied, and later was the teacher of an optional English course. He regularly represented the school at various Orthodox conferences and seminars. In 2006, he participated in a workshop of the Syndesmos youth organization in Brussels, Belgium. In 2004-2007 participated annually in the summer Orthodox youth camp in Potamitissa, Cyprus, as a translator and head of the Russian-speaking delegation. In March 2007 he took an internship at the Orthodox religious department at the University of Joensuu, and at the same time worked on parish assignments for the Finnish Orthodox Church. In June 2007, upon returning to Saint Petersburg, he successfully defended his thesis for a seminary course on "Eschatology in World Religions", and on 17 June he graduated from Saint Petersburg Theological Seminary, and in 2010 graduated from the Saint Petersburg Theological Academy. In September 2008, he was appointed teacher of the Smolensk Theological Seminary.

== Religious life ==
=== Monk ===
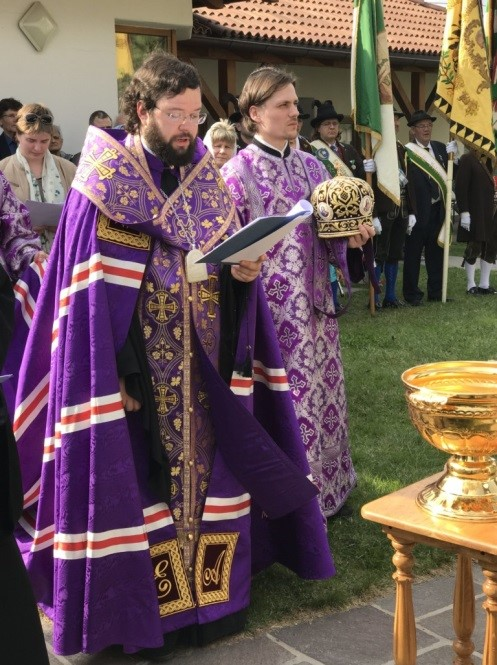
Bishop Anthony leading prayers in Italy in 2017

On 5 March 2009 in Trinity Lavra of St. Sergius he was tonsured a rasophore monk by newly-enthroned Patriarch Kirill of Moscow with name Anthony, after Anthony of Valaam.

On 7 October 2015 in same place he was tonsured mantle monk (little schema) by Kirill, this time with the name of Anthony, after Anthony of Rome.

=== In Italy ===
From 22 March to 30 May 2011, he served as the leading clergyman of the parish of St. Nicholas Stavropegic in Rome, Italy. From 30 May to 12 June 2011 he served as the leading clergyman of the Stavropegial Church in honor of St. Catherine the Great Martyr also in Rome. On 12 June 2011 he was appointed secretary of the parishes of the Moscow Patriarchate in Italy, and elevated to the rank of Archimandrite by Patriarch Kirill.

During his time in Rome, Anthony said that he felt rather lonely as for the first time in his life he was living for a prolonged period of time in a place where Russian Orthodox made a small percentage of the population. Before and during his time in Rome the Orthodox community in Italy had grown to over 50 parishes, mostly due to immigration to Italy from Orthodox populations in Eastern Europe and to a lesser extent by converts. During the same time the Romanian Orthodox community in Italy grew to 163 parishes. Despite feeling uneasy at times, Anthony said that there are many similarities between Italians and Russians in tradition and customs, so the transition to being a pastor in Italy was not hard culturally.

=== Metropolitan of Chersonesus and Western Europe ===
On 30 May 2019, Anthony succeeded John (Roshchin) as the primate of the Patriarchal Exarchate in Western Europe (Moscow Patriarchate), after the Holy Synod of the ROC decided to appoint him and to appoint John (Roshchin) as primate of the Russian Orthodox Diocese of Vienna and Austria. As a result, Anthony became the Metropolitan bishop of the Russian Orthodox Diocese of Chersonesus and Patriarchal exarch in Western Europe, and the locum tenens of the Patriarchal parishes in Italy.

== Views on ecumenism ==
Having spent most of his pastoral career in predominantly Roman Catholic areas, Anthony has stated that it is important for the two churches to have good relations, especially in sites where both Orthodox and Catholic faithful worship. At the Roman Catholic Basilica di San Nicola, a shrine to St. Nicholas the Wonderworker in Bari, he would lead Divine Liturgy on Thursdays. He has thanked the Catholic Church in Italy for its tolerant view of the Orthodox population there, and for occasionally allowing Orthodox to pray in Catholic shrines dedicated to saints that both churches venerate. He did however say it is important that Orthodox worshippers do not pray together with Catholics or attend Mass, as the two churches are not in full communion with one another, and still have theological differences.

Eastern Orthodox Church titles
Preceded by Mark (Golovkov)	Bishop of Bogorodsk (Parishes of the Russian Orthodox Church in Italy); 28 December 2017–15 October 2018	Succeeded by Himself (locum tenens)
Preceded by Tikhon (Zaitsev)	Metropolitan of Vienna and Budapest; 28 December 2017 (bishop)/1 February 2018–30 May 2019	Succeeded by John (Roshchin)
Preceded by John (Roshchin)	Bishop of Chersonesus (Diocese of Chersonesus) and Metropolitan of Chersonesus and Western Europe (Patriarchal Exarchate in Western Europe); 30 May 2019–	Succeeded by Incumbent
