= Patriarchal parishes in Italy =

Location
- Territory: Italy; Malta; San Marino
- Ecclesiastical province: Patriarchal Exarchate in Western Europe (Moscow Patriarchate)
- Metropolitan: Anthony (Sevryuk)
- Headquarters: Rome, Italy

Information
- Denomination: Eastern Orthodox Church
- Established: 2007

Current leadership
- Parent church: Russian Orthodox Church
- Bishop of Bogorodsk: Anthony (Sevryuk)

Website
- http://ortodossia.org/

The Parishes of the Moscow Patriarchate in the Italian Republic (Russian: Приходы Московского патриархата в Итальянской Республике, Italian: parrocchie del Patriarcato di Mosca in Repubblica Italiana) (Note: Also called Italian parishes of the Moscow Patriarchate, (Russian: Италийские приходы Московского патриархата), or Russian Orthodox Church in Italy (Italian: Chiesa Ortodossa Russa in Italia), or Patriarchal parishes in Italy (Russian: Патриаршие приходы в Италии)) is a subdivision of the Russian Orthodox Church which covers the territory of Italy, Malta and San Marino.

Since 18 December 2018, the Patriarchal parishes in Italy is part of the Patriarchal Exarchate in Western Europe.

As Archbishop Mark (Golovkov) noted: "In fact, this structure is an analogy of the diocese". Such a structure is similar to an apostolic vicariate in the Roman Catholic Church.

== History ==
=== Creation ===
On 27 December 2007, by decision of the Holy Synod of the Russian Orthodox Church, the parishes of the Moscow Patriarchate in Italy were separated from the Diocese of Chersonesus and subordinated to the Bishop of Bogorodsk, vicar of the Patriarch of Moscow and all Russia.

On February 2, 2008, Archbishop Innocent (Vasiliev) of Chersonesus, Administrator of the Italian parishes of the Moscow Patriarchate, consecrated building in Rome which is intended for further organize the diocesan administration in it. In 2011, work began on the creation of a full-fledged diocesan administration at the Stavropegial Church of St. Catherine in Rome. For this purpose, the church had two rooms, which house the Secretariat of the office, the office and the archive. Since that time, issues related to the issuance of documents, registration of certificates, maintaining official correspondence concerning the Italian parishes are resolved through the diocesan administration in Rome, and not in Paris as before.

On May 21, 2012, the Administration of the Moscow Patriarchate parishes in Italy (Italian: Amministrazione delle parrocchie del Patriarcato di Mosca in Italia) received the status of a legal entity in the Italian Republic.

In July 2014, a Libro del Celebrante. Sluzhebnik was published in Italian. The book contains the liturgies of St. John Chrysostom and St. Basil the Great translated in Italian by the Administration of the Moscow Patriarchate parishes in Italy.

In 2017 Bishop Anthony (Sevryuk) said that there are 67 parishes in Italy, and that the second-largest diocese of the Moscow Patriarchate abroad is in the Apennines. Ha added that besides Russians, Ukrainians and Moldovans, there are Italians in the patriarchate because of marriage to a member or by their independent choice.

=== Within the PEWE ===
On 28 December 2018, in response to the Ecumenical Patriarchate's actions in Ukraine, the Holy Synod of the Russian Orthodox Church decided to create the Patriarchal Exarchate in Western Europe (PEWE) with its center in Paris whose "pastoral sphere of responsibility includes" Andorra, Belgium, the United Kingdom, Ireland, Spain, Italy, Liechtenstein, Luxembourg, the Principality of Monaco, the Netherlands, Portugal, France, and Switzerland. The person chosen to be the primate of the PEWE as well as of the Russian Orthodox Diocese of Chersonesus was Bishop John (Roschchin) of Bogorodsk who was at the time the administrator of the Patriarchal parishes in Italy; John continued to administer temporarily the Patriarchal parishes in Italy.

On February 26, 2019, the Holy Synod of the Russian Orthodox Church abolished the stauropigial status of the St. Nicholas parish and the St. Catherine parish in Rome and subordinated them to the Administration of the Parishes of the Moscow Patriarchate in Italy.

On May 30, 2019, the Holy Synod of the ROC "taking into account the increasing number of Moldovan parishes and communities in Italy, as well as the need for special care of the numerous Moldovan-speaking flock of the Moscow Patriarchate in the Apennines" entrusted their archpastoral care to the bishop who bears the title of "Bogorodsk" as vicar of the Patriarchal Exarch of Western Europe. In the same decision, Bishop Ambrose (Munteanu) was appointed Bishop of Bogorodsk.

== Ruling bishops ==
- Innocent (Vasiliev) (27 December 2007 — 24 December 2010)
- Nestor (Sirotenko) (24 December 2010 — 16 July 2013)
- Mark (Golovkov) (16 July 2013 — 22 October 2015)
- Anthony (Sevryuk) (26 October 2015 — 29 July 2017)
- Matthew (Andreev) (29 July — 28 December 2017)
- Anthony (Sevryuk) (28 December 2017 — 15 October 2018)
- John (Roshchin) (15 October 2018 — 30 May 2019)
- Anthony (Sevryuk) (30 May 2019-), locum tenens

== See also ==
- Assembly of Canonical Orthodox Bishops of Italy and Malta
