= Patriarchal Exarchate in Western Europe =

Exarchate of the Russian Orthodox Church

- Патриарший экзархат в Западной Европе
- Abbreviation: PEWE
- Classification: Eastern Orthodox Church
- Exarch: Metropolitan Mark (Golovkov) of Chersonesus and Western Europe
- Headquarters: Paris
- Territory: Andorra, Belgium, the United Kingdom, Ireland, Spain, Italy, Liechtenstein, Luxembourg, Monaco, the Netherlands, Portugal, France, Switzerland, Gibraltar
- Founder: Holy Synod of the Russian Orthodox Church
- Origin: 28 December 2018; Moscow
- Recognition: by the Russian Orthodox Church (28 December 2018), as an exarchate

The Patriarchal Exarchate in Western Europe (PEWE, French: Exarchat patriarcal en Europe occidentale, Russian: Патриарший экзархат в Западной Европе/Патриарший экзархат Западной Европы) is an exarchate created by the Russian Orthodox Church (ROC) on 28 December 2018. The primate of the PEWE is Metropolitan Nestor (Sirotenko), who holds the title of "Metropolitan of Chersonesus and Western Europe".

In a complex sequence of events in c. 2018–2020, the Archdiocese of Russian Orthodox Churches in Western Europe split in two because of the 2018 Moscow–Constantinople schism. About half of the jurisdictions joined the Moscow Patriarchate as "Archeparchy of the Parishes of Russian tradition in Western Europe" (not part of the new Patriarchal Exarchate), while the remaining jurisdictions joined various other patriarchates aligned with the Ecumenical Patriarchate of Constantinople, such as the Greek Orthodox Metropolis of France.

== History ==
=== Prehistory: 1945 to 1991 ===
On September 7, 1945, by the decision of the Holy Synod of the ROC, The Western European Exarchate of the Moscow Patriarchate was established, headed by Metropolitan Eulogius (Georgievsky), then seriously ill. On the death of the latter on August 8, 1946 by decision of the Synod and the decree of Patriarch Alexius I of Moscow, Metropolitan Seraphim (Lukyanov) was appointed new Exarch of Western Europe. However, in France, almost the entire clergy and flock of Metropolitan Eulogy wished to remain under the jurisdiction of the Patriarchate of Constantinople.

From 1947 to 1989 a quarterly journal, the "Herald Of the Russian Patriarchal Exarchate" (French: Messager de l'Exarchat du patriarche russe en Europe occidentale), was published in Paris.

Throughout the postwar period until the early 1990s, the situation of the communities of the Russian Orthodox Church in Western Europe was difficult: Augustine Roberts, one of the priests, wrote to Patriarch Alexius I in 1956: "In most Western European countries, the affiliation to the jurisdiction of Moscow is a difficult matter. We seem politically suspicious to our Orthodox and non-Orthodox brothers, and many people who are interested in Orthodoxy as such do not want to have anything to do with the "Soviet" Church, i.e., the "Bolshevik" One. Our pastoral and missionary work suffers from the fact that we belong to this jurisdiction. The isolation of the Russian Church in the West is catastrophic for the entire future of Orthodoxy in the West".

In 1960, the Diocese of Chersonesus was established with its center in Paris; in 1962, the Diocese of Sourozh was established with its center in London. The Diocese of The Hague was established in 1972.

The Council of bishops of the Russian Orthodox Church on January 30 — 31, 1990, among others overseas Exarchates of the Russian Orthodox Church, abolished the Western European Exarchate. Its dioceses were directly subjected to the Moscow Patriarch and the Holy Synod of the Russian Orthodox Church.

=== Dissolution of the Archdiocese ===
On 27 November 2018 the synod of the Ecumenical Patriarchate decided to dissolve the Archdiocese of Russian Orthodox churches in Western Europe (AROCWE) "thereby entrusting its faithful to the Hierarchs of the Ecumenical Throne in Europe". This decision was made without any official requests from the hierarchs of the AROCWE and caused confusion. On 15 December Pastoral Assembly of AROCWE decided to call an extraordinary General Assembly, scheduled for 23 February 2019. This General Assembly will discuss the decision of the Ecumenical Patriarchate to dissolve the AROCWE. ROC officials responded with a reminder of the 2003 proposal of Alexy II to the AROCWE to move to the Moscow Patriarchate.

On 29 November, after the synod of the Ecumenical Patriarchate had ended, the same communiqué which had been released one day prior concerning the Ecumenical Patriarchate's decision to dissolve the AROCWE was released, in French, on the official website of the Ecumenical Patriarchate. The Ecumenical Patriarchate "never explicitly justified" its decision to dissolve the AROCWE.

On 30 November, the council of the AROCWE declared in a communiqué that this decision of the Ecumenical Patriarchate was "unforeseen". The communiqué added that since the AROCWE had not requested this decision, two things should be done before the AROCWE would comply to this decision: the primate of the AROCWE Archbishop John of Charioupolis, as the head of the AROCWE, will have to "invite the priests of the Archdiocese to a pastoral assembly, on December 15, 2018, to discuss with those who carry with him the spiritual responsibility of the parishes and faithful of the Archdiocese" and the AROCWE council will have to "convene a general assembly of the Archdiocese, in which all the clergy and lay delegates elected by the parishes and communities, which are the adherent associations of the Diocesan Union, will take part." The communiqué concluded that since John of Charioupolis had not requested this decision, he still remained fully in pastoral charge of the Russian Orthodox Churches in Western Europe.

=== Creation of the Patriarchal Exarchate ===
On 28 December 2018, in response to the Ecumenical Patriarchate's actions in Ukraine, the Holy Synod of the Russian Orthodox Church decided to create "a Patriarchal Exarchate in Western Europe with the center in Paris" whose "pastoral sphere of responsibility includes" Andorra, Belgium, the United Kingdom, Ireland, Spain, Italy, Liechtenstein, Luxembourg, the Principality of Monaco, the Netherlands, Portugal, France, and Switzerland. During the same synod, the decision was also taken to create "a diocese of the Russian Orthodox Church in Spain and Portugal with the center in Madrid" as well as "a Patriarchal Exarchate in South-East Asia [PESEA] with the center in Singapore." On the same day, in an interview with Russia-24 channel, Metropolitan Hilarion, head of the Synodal Department for External Church Relations of the ROC, declared the ROC "will now act as if they [Constantinople] do not exist at all because our purpose is missionary, our task is to educate, we are creating these structures for ministerial care about our flock, there can be no such deterring factors here", and that the ROC will take charge of the Eastern Orthodox faithfuls of its diaspora instead of the Ecumenical Patriarchate.

Before that, the Diocese of Chersonesus was taking charge of the Orthodox communities of the Moscow Patriarchate in France, Switzerland, Portugal and Spain.

The person chosen to be the primate of the PEWE as well as of the Russian Orthodox Diocese of Chersonesus was Bishop John (Roschchin) of Bogorodsk. Bishop John was granted the title of "of Chersonesus and Western Europe". Bishop John was granted the title of Metropolitan on 3 January 2019 by Patriarch Kirill at Moscow's Dormition Cathedral.

=== Metropolitan Anthony as ruling bishop ===
On 30 May 2019, the Holy Synod of the ROC decided to appoint archbishop Anthony (Sevryuk) of Vienna and Budapest as primate of the PEWE and of the diocese of Chersonesus. At the same time, John (Roshchin), who was until then the primate of the PEWE and of the diocese of Chersonesus, was appointed as primate of the ROC diocese of Vienna and Budapest to replace archbishop Anthony.

On 31 May 2019, archbishop Anthony was consecrated metropolitan because of his appointment as exarch of the PEWE.

The nomination of Anthony as primate of the PEWE on 30 May 2019 was, according to Novaya Gazeta, related to the fact that Anthony would be negotiating the integration of the AROCWE into the Moscow Patriarchate.

On December 4, 2019, the first meeting of the Synod of the Patriarchal Exarchate of Western Europe took place in the building of the Korsun Diocesan Administration in Paris.

The "old" Archdiocese of Russian Orthodox Churches in Western Europe", now "Archeparchy of the Parishes of Russian tradition in Western Europe", is currently not part of the new Patriarchal Exarchate in Western Europe.

== Structure ==
Since 26 February 2019, the PEWE is divided into 6 dioceses:

- Diocese of Chersonesus (Liechtenstein, Monaco, France, Switzerland), always headed by the primate of the PEWE
- Diocese of Brussels (Belgium, Luxembourg)
- Diocese of The Hague (the Netherlands)
- Diocese of Spain-Portugal (Andorra, Gibraltar, Spain, Portugal)
- Diocese of Sourozh (Ireland, United Kingdom)
- The parishes of the Russian Orthodox Church in Italy (Italy, Malta, San Marino)

== Exarchs ==
- Eulogius (Georgiyevsky) (September 2, 1945 - August 8, 1946)
- Seraphim (Lukyanov) (August 9, 1946 - November 15, 1949)
- Photius (Topiro) (February 1950 - October 26, 1951)
- Boris (Vik) (October 26, 1951 - November 11, 1954)
- Nicholas (Yeryomin) (November 11, 1954 - January 14, 1963)
- Anthony (Bloom) (January 14, 1963 - April 5, 1974)
- Nikodim (Rotov) (September 3, 1974 - September 5, 1978)
- Philaret (Vakhromeyev) (October 12, 1978 - February 1, 1984)
- Vladimir (Sabodan) (March 28, 1984 - February 19, 1990)
  Exarchate abolished (1990-2018)
- John (Roshchin) (28 December 2018-30 May 2019)
- Anthony (Sevryuk) (30 May 2019-13 October 2022)
- Nestor (Sirotenko) (13 October 2022 - 12 March 2026)

== Notable churches ==
- Holy Trinity Cathedral and the Russian Orthodox Spiritual and Cultural Center, Paris
- Russian Orthodox Cathedral, Nice
- Church of St. Michael the Archangel, Cannes
- Church of the Saints Alexander Nevsky and Seraphim of Sarov, Liège
- Church of Maria Magdalena, Madrid
- Church of Saint Michael Archangel, Altea
- Church of the Presentation of the Lord, Tenerife
- Church of Saint Catherine of Alexandria, Rome
- Church of Christ the Saviour, San Remo
- Church of Saint Alexander Nevsky, Rotterdam
- Dormition Cathedral, London

== See also ==
- Archdiocese of Russian Orthodox churches in Western Europe
- Serbian Orthodox Eparchy of Western Europe
- Patriarchal Exarchate in South-East Asia – exarchate of the Russian Orthodox Church created for the same reasons and during the same synod
