= Appeal of the Clergy of the Russian Orthodox Church for Reconciliation and an End to War =

2022 cease-fire appeal

Appeal of the Clergy for Reconciliation and End to the War
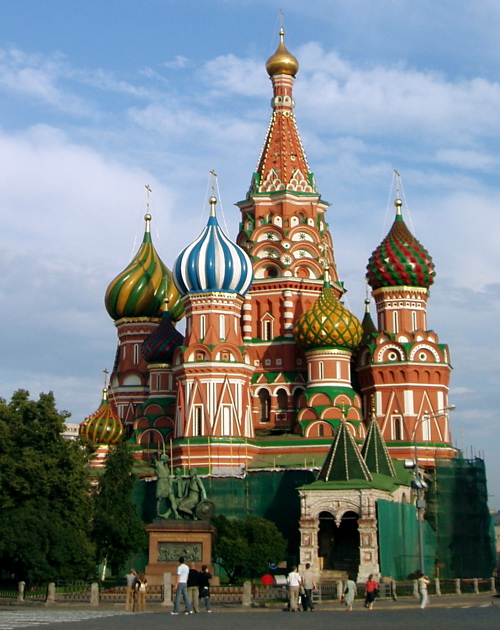
- St. Basil's Cathedral in Moscow, known for its distinctive architecture and colorful domes.
- Date: March 13, 2022
- Organized by: Nearly 300 priests, monks and deacons of the Moscow Patriarchate (including Giovanni Guaita)

In 2022, 233 priests, monks and deacons from the Moscow Patriarchate have collectively petitioned Patriarch Kirill of Moscow for reconciliation and an immediate ceasefire in the Ukrainian war. The appeal, timed just after the Sunday of the Last Judgement, emphasized the inevitability of divine judgment, expressed sorrow for the suffering in Ukraine, and called for the safe return of soldiers. The clergy advocates for bridging divides, respecting human freedom, and choosing peace independently. They caution against the consequences of ignoring pleas for peace and emphasize the importance of dialogue. The appeal concludes with a call to embrace Great Lent in the spirit of faith, hope, and love. Additionally, the Orthodox Peace Fellowship is actively involved in peace efforts and invites support for their initiatives.
