= Church of Saint Peter and Paul, Karlovy Vary =

Church of Saint Peter and Paul
- Це́рковь Святы́х первоверхо́вных апо́столов Петра́ и Па́вла
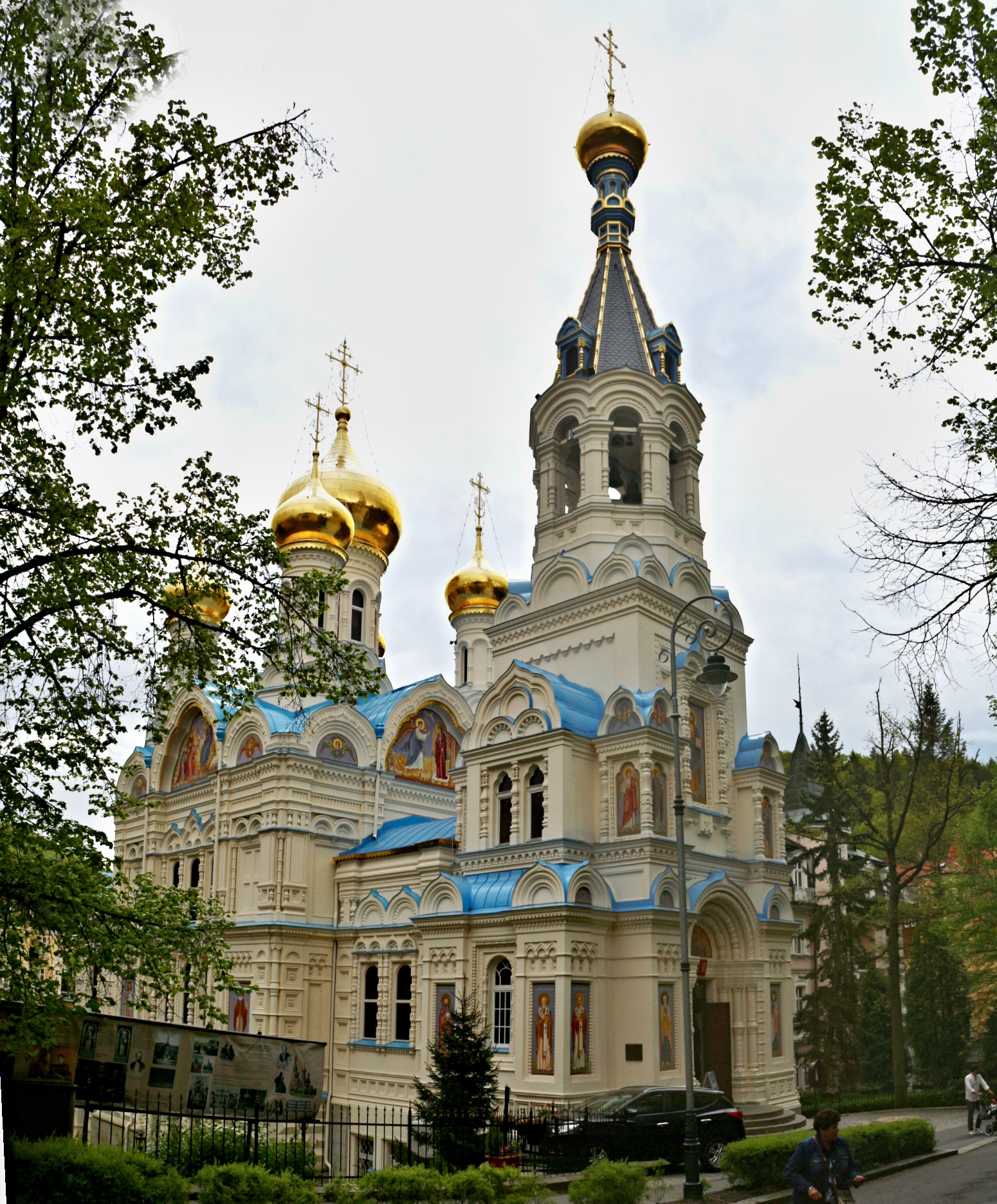
- Church of Saint Peter and Paul
- 50°13′29″N 12°52′30″E
- Location: Karlovy Vary
- Country: Czech Republic
- Denomination: Russian Orthodox

History
- Status: active
- Consecrated: 9 June 1897

Architecture
- Architect: Gustav Wiedermann
- Style: Eclectism
- Years built: 1893–1897
- Groundbreaking: 1893

Specifications
- Length: 41 m (135 ft)
- Width: 14 m (46 ft)
- Height: 40 m (130 ft)

Church of Saint Peter and Paul (Russian: Це́рковь Святы́х первоверхо́вных апо́столов Петра́ и Па́вла) is a Russian Orthodox church in Karlovy Vary, Czech Republic. It is the largest and most important Orthodox church in the country.

== History ==
The current church was designed in Byzantine style back in 1893 by local architect Gustav Wiedermann as a replacement for a previous substandard orthodox chapel, located at Mariánskolázeňská street. Construction started later that year. The design of the Church of the Holy Trinity in Ostankinsky District of Moscow was used as pattern. Construction was finished in 1897 and the church was consecrated on 9 June 1897 in the name of the holy apostles Peter and Paul.

== Interior ==
Among the most valuable interior furnishings is a wooden iconostasis with oil paintings of saints by the painter Tyurin, which was originally made for the 1900 World exposition in Paris.
