= Department for External Church Relations of the Moscow Patriarchate =

Synodal institution of the Russian Orthodox Church

- Отдел внешних церковных связей Московского Патриархата
- Logo of the DECR

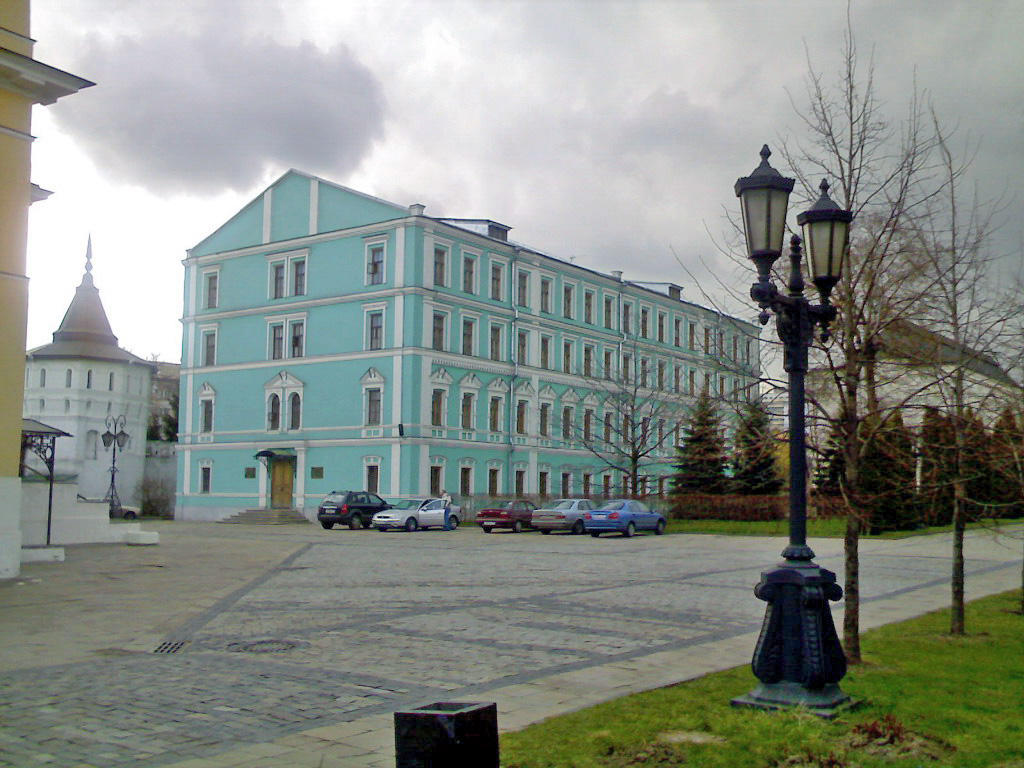
- Building in the Danilov Monastery of the Department for External Church Relations of the Moscow Patriarchate
- Abbreviation: DECR
- Formation: 4 April 1946
- Founders: Patriarch of Moscow and all Rus' Alexy I
- Type: Synodal Department of the Moscow Patriarchate
- Official language: Russian
- Chairman: Metropolitan Anthony (Sevryuk)
- Website: http://mospat.ru/
- Formerly called: Department for External Church Relations

The Department for External Church Relations of the Moscow Patriarchate (DECR) (Russian: Отде́л вне́шних церко́вных свя́зей Моско́вского патриарха́та (ОВЦС); until August 2000: Department for External Church Relations, Russian: Отдел внешних церковных сношений) is one of the synodal institutions of the Russian Orthodox Church. It was established on 4 April 1946.

== History ==
=== Creation ===
On 20 September 1918, the Local Council of the Russian Orthodox Church "for the sake of resolving difficulties on the path to unity and to possibly facilitate [...] the achievement of the ultimate goal" (that is, restoring unity and communication) instructed the Synod to form a standing commission under the Synod with branches in Russia and far abroad to interact with non-Eastern-Orthodox churches. However, it was not possible to establish that Commission.

On 4 April 1946, by decision of the Holy Synod of the Russian Orthodox Church, the Department for external church relations was formed and had as its goal "the management of foreign institutions of the Russian Orthodox Church (dioceses, parishes, exarchates, metropolitan districts, spiritual missions, etc.; relations with autocephalous Eastern Orthodox Churches; correspondence with foreign institutions; processing of foreign correspondence: translation into Russian, preparation of answers, preparation of archival and scientific references; preparation of reports on all fundamental issues arising in connection with the management of foreign institutions, the relationship of the Russian Church with other autocephalous Churches and the leadership of non-Eastern-Orthodox religions".

Initially, the department had a small staff; along with Metropolitan Nicholas, the first employee of the department was Alexey Buevsky (clerk since May 1946).

According to David Gzgyan, member of the Russian Orthodox Church’s Inter-conciliar Conference: "under the new Patriarch, Alexy I, in 1945 a special body was created in the structure of the Moscow Patriarchate: the Department for External Church Relations [...] since then, its head has been the 'person number two' of the Russian Orthodox Church. This situation is unique in the whole history of the church throughout the world: the key role in the activities of the Church belonged to the department of external relations, which normally should occupy the most modest place. Today, the DECR, of course, is not the same, but the general veil of "special status" remains. In the second half of the 1940s, the Department was allocated colossal funds to carry out numerous contacts with the Middle Eastern patriarchates and churches of Europe, including non-Eastern-Orthodox (for example, Anglican). In addition, it was given a large-scale task: to create an anti-Vatican block."

The work to strengthen the department in 1960-1961 was carried out by the Council for the Affairs of the Russian Orthodox Church under the Council of Ministers of the USSR, "fulfilling the decision of the Central Committee of the CPSU of July 25, 1960."

In accordance with the decision of the Holy Synod of 16 March 1961, the head of the department should always be in the episcopal dignity and a permanent member of the Holy Synod of the Russian Orthodox Church.

In the first half of 1962, the DECR purchased a building on Ryleyev Street, which became its headquarter for many years.

From 1967 (or 1965) to 2009, the DECR of the MP published the Information Bulletin of the Department for External Church Relations of the Moscow Patriarchate (Russian: Информационный бюллетень Отдела внешних церковных сношений Московского Патриархата). The newsletter gave information on international church contacts, the most significant events concerning the Russian Orthodox Church and other local and non-Eastern-Orthodox churches, as well as reviews of articles published in foreign church periodicals, etc.

On December 16, 1969, the Holy Synod decided: "1. To establish in Kiev under the Exarch of Ukraine a branch of the Department for External Church Relations of the Moscow Patriarchate; 2. The Chairperson of the branch shall be His Grace Metropolitan of Kiev and Galicia, Exarch of Ukraine."

=== 1970s to 2009 ===
On July 25, 1979, by the decision of the Holy Synod in Leningrad, another branch of the DECR was established under the Metropolitan of Leningrad and Novgorod.

On the occasion of its 35th anniversary, on 6 March 1981 the DECR was awarded the Order of St. Sergius of Radonezh, 1st class.

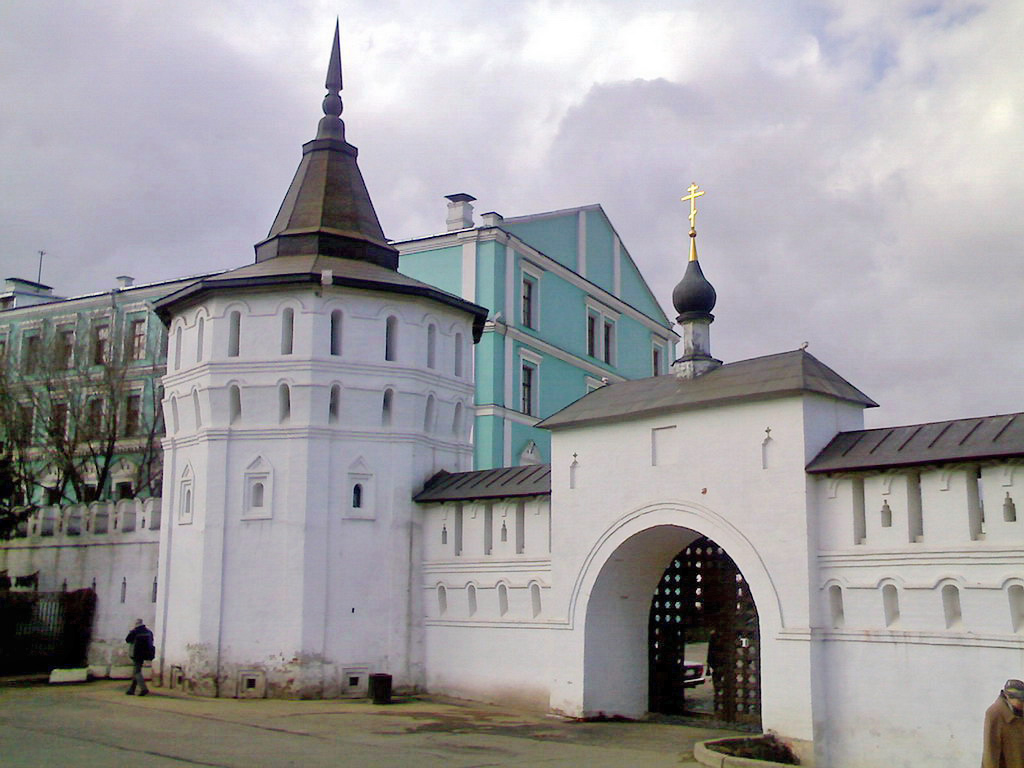
Entry to the Danilov Monastery, with the building of the Department for External Church Relations of the Moscow Patriarchate behind (in cyan)

On 15 October 1985, the DECR moved from a small mansion on Ryleyev Street, number 18/2, to the restored New fraternal building, which has four floors, on the territory of the Moscow Danilov Monastery which had been the transferred to the Church on the eve of the anniversary of the 1000th anniversary of the baptism of Rus'.

On 27 April 1986, the year of its 40th anniversary, the department was awarded the Order of saint Grand Duke Vladimir Equal-to-the-Apostles, 1st class.

On 21 August 1997, in connection with the restructuring of the department, "instead of the pre-existing sectors responsible for certain narrow areas of the Department's activities", new divisions appeared: the secretariat for inter-Eastern-Orthodox relations and foreign institutions, the secretariat for inter-Christian relations, the secretariat for relations between the Church and society and the administrative and financial secretariat; sectors for foreign institutions, Eastern Orthodox pilgrimage, and later the communication service and publication sector.

=== Since 2009 ===
==== Patriarch Kirill's decentralisation ====
On 31 March 2009, the Holy Synod, at its first meeting under the chairmanship of the newly elected Patriarch Kirill, reformed the DECR, forming new synodal institutions, which were entrusted with certain areas of activity previously dealt with by the DECR. The Department for Church-Society Relations, independent from the DECR, was created; this department was responsible for "the implementation of relations with legislative bodies, political parties, professional and creative unions, and other civil society institutions in the canonical territory of the Moscow Patriarchate." Dioceses, representative offices, metochions, monasteries and stavropegic parishes far abroad, which were previously under the authority of the DECR, were directly subordinated to the Patriarch of Moscow of All Russia; to manage them, the Moscow Patriarchate's Secretariat for Institutions Abroad (Note: Since 2010, it is named the Moscow Patriarchate's Administration for Institutions Abroad) was created. The Synodal Information Department was created. The post-graduate department of the Moscow Theological Academy, which operated under the DECR, was transformed into the All-Church postgraduate and doctoral school named after Saints Cyril and Methodius Equal-to-the-Apostles.

In 2011, on the occasion of its 65th anniversary, with funds allocated by the Saint Gregory the Theologian's Charity Foundation, the DECR facade was decorated with a mosaic image of the Blessed Virgin Mary with an omophorion in her hands.

On April 6, 2016, with the blessing of Patriarch Kirill of Moscow and All Russia, the award of the Department for External Church Relations of the Moscow Patriarchate was established: the medal of St. Mark of Ephesus.

== Contemporary situation ==
The status and functions of the department are determined by the Charter of the Russian Orthodox Church adopted by the Bishops' Council of the Russian Orthodox Church in 2000, in particular chapter VIII, and the charter of the department, approved by the Holy Synod in 1992 and amended in 1999 and 2001.

=== Role of the DECR ===
The purpose, tasks and functions of the DECR are defined as follows:

The DECR is accountable to His Holiness the Patriarch and the Holy Synod, which annually approve its work plan. The documents guiding the DECR’s work are resolutions of the Local and Bishops’ Councils of the Russian Orthodox Church, resolutions of the Holy Synod and Patriarchal instructions. The DECR chairman is appointed by the Patriarch of Moscow and All Russia and the Holy Synod of the Russian Orthodox Church. [...]

The DECR maintains the Russian Orthodox Church’s relations with the Local Orthodox Churches, non-Orthodox Churches, Christian associations, non-Christian religious communities, as well as governmental, parliamentary, non-governmental institutions abroad and inter-governmental, religious and public international organizations.

Among the DECR's tasks is to inform His Holiness the Patriarch and the Holy Synod about developments and events taking place outside the Russian Orthodox Church and affecting its interests, as well as to draft church-wide documents and decisions concerning the inter-Orthodox, inter-Christian, interreligious and international relations and other issues within its competence.

One of the main spheres of the DECR's work is fraternal cooperation with the Local Orthodox Churches carried out through the DECR Secretariat for Inter-Orthodox Relations. [...]

Relations with non-Orthodox Christians are maintained through the efforts of the DECR Secretariat for Inter-Christian Relations. [...]

The Secretariat for Far Abroad Countries promotes the Moscow Patriarchate's relations with inter-governmental institutions, international non-governmental organizations, as well as governmental bodies, public and interreligious associations and non-Christian religious communities in far abroad countries. It also works with compatriots who live outside the canonical territory of the Moscow Patriarchate.

Within the structure of the Department for External Church Relations there is also the Secretariat for Interreligious Relations that maintains and promotes contacts with various religious communities both in the countries of the Moscow Patriarchate’s canonical responsibility and in far abroad countries, as well as at international platforms, and helps develop the dialogue with traditional religions of the Russian Federation, in particular, within the framework of the Interreligious Council of Russia.

The DECR Communication Service is in charge of contacts with secular mass media and monitors publications about the Russian Orthodox Church. It also maintains the DECR’s official web-site and helps maintain the official site of the Moscow Patriarchate.

The Publications Section publishes the Church and Time theological and church-public magazine and carries out specific publishing projects.

=== Structure of the DECR ===
The following divisions which compose the DECR are:

- Secretariats:
  1. Secretariat for Inter-Eastern-Orthodox Relations;
  2. Secretariat for Inter-Christian Relations;
  3. Secretariat for Interreligious Relations;
  4. Secretariat for Far Abroad Countries.
- Sections:
  1. Economy Section;
  2. Protocol Section;
  3. Publications Section.
- Services:
  1. Communication Service;
  2. Legal Service;
  3. Language (i.e. Translation) Service.
- Commission for the Affairs of Old Believers' Parishes and for Cooperation with the Old Believers.
- Branches:
  - Branch of the department in St. Petersburg;
  - Branch of the department in Ukraine.

The DECR has a number of divisions whose work is auxiliary: archive, office, warehouse, typewriting bureau, shipping.

== Chairman of the DECR ==
The following people have been chairmen of the DECR:

- Metropolitan Nicholas Yarushevich (April 4, 1946 – June 21, 1960)
- Metropolitan Nikodim Rotov (June 21, 1960 – May 30, 1972)
- Metropolitan Juvenal Poyarkov (May 30, 1972 – April 14, 1981)
- Metropolitan Philaret Vakhromeyev (April 14, 1981 – November 13, 1989)
- Metropolitan Kirill Gundyaev (November 13, 1989 – February 1, 2009)
- Archbishop Mark Golovkov (February 11 – March 31, 2009) (temporarily)
- Metropolitan Hilarion Alfeyev (March 31, 2009 – June 7, 2022)
- Metropolitan Anthony Sevryuk (June 7, 2022 – present)

== Current leadership of the DECR ==
- Metropolitan Anthony (Sevryuk) of Volokolamsk - chairman;
  - Archimandrite Philaret (Bulekov) - vice-chairman;
  - Archpriest Igor Vyzhanov - vice-chairman;
  - Archpriest Igor Yakimchuk - vice-chairman;.
