= Russian Orthodox Diocese of Chersonesus =

Diocese of Chersonesus

Location
- Territory: Principality of Monaco; France; Liechtenstein; Switzerland
- Ecclesiastical province: Patriarchal Exarchate in Western Europe (Moscow Patriarchate)
- Metropolitan: Anthony (Sevryuk)
- Headquarters: Paris

Information
- Denomination: Eastern Orthodox Church
- Established: 1960

Current leadership
- Parent church: Russian Orthodox Church
- Bishop of Chersonesus and Western Europe: Anthony (Sevryuk)

Website
- https://www.egliserusse.eu/ (fr) https://www.cerkov-ru.com/ (ru)

Paris' new Russian Orthodox Cathedral

The Diocese of Chersonesus (Russian: Корсунская епархия, French: Diocèse de Chersonèse, also called Diocese of Korsun) is a diocese of the Russian Orthodox Church which covers the territory of France, Switzerland, Liechtenstein and Monaco. This diocese is part of the Patriarchal Exarchate in Western Europe since December 28, 2018.

The current primate of the Diocese of Chersonesus is Metropolitan Anthony (Sevryuk) since May 30, 2019. The primate of the diocese of Chersonesus is also the primate of the PEWE.

== History ==
The diocese with its headquarter in Paris, France, was established on January 5, 1960, as part of the Exarchate of the Moscow Patriarchate in Western Europe, when Archbishop Nicholas (Eryomin) of Clichy received the title of "Metropolitan of Chersonesus". The diocese was named after Chersonesus, called Korsun in Russian (Russian: Корсунь from Old East Slavic), an ancient city in Crimea, founded as a colony by the Greeks. According to a legend, it was there that Prince Vladimir of Kiev decided to become a Christian, opening a new page in the history of Russia.

From 1979 to 1990, the Diocese of Chersonesus did not have a ruling Bishop, because the clergy of the Moscow Patriarchate from the USSR were considered by the French authorities to be Soviet agents, and obtaining a visa for them was very difficult. In addition, the financial situation of the priests of the Exarchate of the Moscow Patriarchate was quite difficult.

By the decision of the Council of Bishops of the ROC on January 30–31, 1990, the Western European Exarchate was abolished, and its dioceses, including the Chersonesus one, were subordinated directly to the Holy Synod and the Patriarch of Moscow.

Only after the fall of the Iron Curtain did this situation change. New emigrants from the former USSR rushed to the countries under the jurisdiction of the Diocese, which made it possible to replenish the already existing parishes and create new ones. In addition, some parishes of the diocese were established in Spain and Portugal, where there were no parishes of the Moscow Patriarchate previously. The 2000s were characterized by an increase in the number of parishes and parishioners – primarily due to migrants from the countries of the former USSR, the aggravation of the relations with the Western European Exarchate of Russian parishes and the normalization of relations with the Diocese of Geneva and Western Europe of the Russian Orthodox Church Outside of Russia (ROCOR). On December 27, 2007, by the decision of the Holy Synod, the patriarcal parishes in Italy were separated from the diocese of Chersonesus and "subordinated to the canonical jurisdiction of the Bishop who bears the title "of Bogorodsk"".

On April 15, 2008, the Holy Synod of the Russian Orthodox Church ordered to open an Orthodox Seminary in France near Paris. Bishop Innocent (Vasiliev) of Chersonesus was appointed Chancellor of the Seminary.

On December 25, 2013, after numerous approvals, a project was approved for the construction of an Orthodox Cathedral and a Russian spiritual and cultural center in Paris. The official opening of the spiritual and cultural center took place on October 19, 2016, and on December 4 of the same year Patriarch Kirill of Moscow and all Russia led the consecration of the Holy Trinity church in Paris.

On December 28, 2018, the Holy Synod of the Russian Orthodox Church formed the Spanish-Portuguese diocese which consists of Spain, Portugal and Andorra. At the same time, the diocese of Chersonesus and the newly created Spanish-Portuguese diocese became part of the newly established Patriarchal Exarchate in Western Europe (PEWE), and John (Roshchin) was appointed as primate of the PEWE and of the diocese of Chersonesus. Before that, the Diocese of Chersonesus took charge of the Orthodox communities of the Moscow Patriarchate in France, Switzerland, Portugal and Spain.

On May 30, 2019, the Holy Synod of the ROC decided to appoint archbishop Anthony (Sevryuk) of Vienna and Budapest as primate of the PEWE and of the diocese of Chersonesus. At the same time, John (Roshchin), who was until then the primate of the PEWE and of the diocese of Chersonesus, was appointed as primate of the ROC diocese of Vienna and Budapest to replace archbishop Anthony.

On May 31, 2019, archbishop Anthony was consecrated metropolitan because of his appointment as exarch of the PEWE.

== Ruling bishops ==
- Nicholas (Eryomin) (January 5, 1960 – January 14, 1963)
- Anthony (Bloom) (January 14, 1963 – September 12, 1968), administrator, Metropolitan of Sourozh
- Peter (L'Huillier) (September 12, 1968 – November 16, 1979)
- Philaret (Vakhromeyev) (November 16, 1979 – March 28, 1984), administrator, Metropolitan of Minsk
- Vladimir (Sabodan) (March 28, 1984 – February 20, 1990), administrator, Metropolitan of Rostov
- Kirill (Gundyaev) (February 20 – October 27, 1990), administrator, Archbishop of Smolensk
- Valentine (Mishchuk) (October 27, 1990 – February 18, 1992)
- Gurias (Shalimov) (January 14, 1993 – March 31, 1999)
- Kirill (Gundyaev) (March 31 – October 6, 1999), administrator Metropolitan of Smolensk
- Innocent (Vasiliev) (October 6, 1999 – December 24, 2010)
- Nestor (Sirotenko) (December 24, 2010 – December 28, 2018)
- John (Roshchin) (December 28, 2018 – May 30, 2019)
- Anthony (Sevryuk) (May 30, 2019–)

== See also ==
- Assembly of Canonical Orthodox Bishops of France
- Assembly of Canonical Orthodox Bishops of Switzerland and Lichtenstein
