= Mark Golovkov =

Russian Eastern Orthodox bishop (born 1964)

His Eminence Mark Golovkov
- Patriarchal Exarch of Western Europe; Metropolitan of Chersonesus and Western Europe; Administrator of the diocese of Budapest and Hungary; Administrator of the archdiocese of Madrid and Lisbon; Administrator of the Patriarchal parishes in Italy
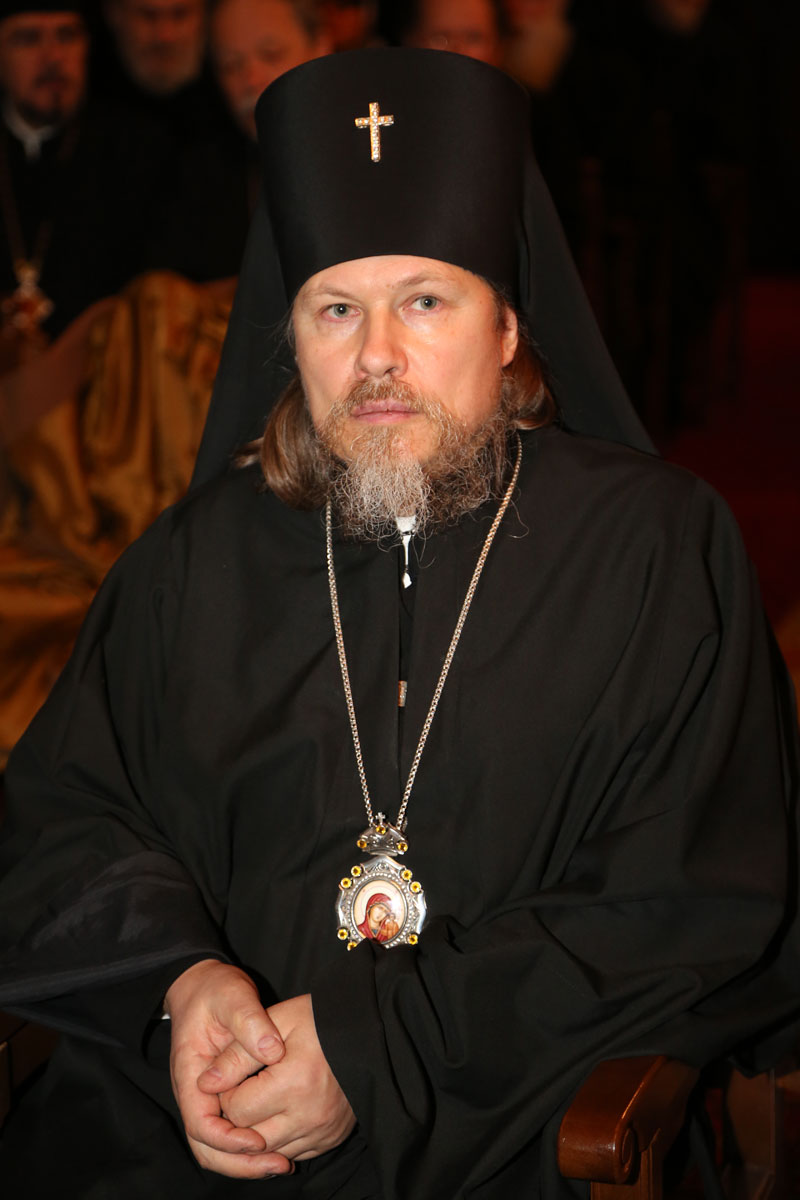
- Bishop Mark in February 2014
- Native name: Марк
- Church: Russian Orthodox Church
- Metropolis: Chersonesus and Western Europe
- Appointed: 12 March 2026
- Predecessor: Nestor (Sirotenko)

Orders
- Ordination: 14 January 2004 (bishop) by Patriarch Alexy II of Moscow
- Rank: Metropolitan

Personal details
- Born: Sergey Anatolievich Golovkov; March 31, 1964 (age 62) Perm, Russian SFSR, Soviet Union
- Denomination: Eastern Orthodox Church

Metropolitan Mark (Russian: Митрополит Марк, secular name Sergey Anatolievich Golovkov, Russian: Сергей Анатольевич Головков; born 31 March 1964), is a bishop in the Russian Orthodox Church. He is the incumbent Patriarchal Exarch of Western Europe, holding the title of Chersonesus and Western Europe.

In the past he was the metropolitan bishop of Ryazan.

== Early life ==
Graduating from high school in his hometown of Perm in 1981, Golovkov then enlisted in the Soviet Army. He served his mandatory time in the army from 1982 to 1984.

== Academic life ==
In 1984 he entered the Moscow Theological Seminary, after which in 1988 he entered the Moscow Theological Academy. In September 1990, he was appointed assistant head of the Church and Archaeological Cabinet at the academy. From 1990 to 1992 Golovkov taught courses relating to the scriptures of the New Testament at the academy. In 1992 he graduated from the Moscow Theological Academy with a Ph.D. in theology.

== Priest ==
On 19 October 1990 he was tonsured a monk at the famous Russian Orthodox monastery named Trinity Lavra of St. Sergius, and was ordained a hierodeacon in the same location on 21 November 1990. He was finally ordained a hieromonk on 7 January 1991.

August 12, 1992 Fr. Mark was assigned by the Holy Synod of the Moscow Patriarchate to be a member of the Russian Ecclesiastical Mission in Jerusalem.

On the Eastern Orthodox feast day of Pentecost in 1997, Golovkov was elevated to the rank of Hegumen, or leader of a major monastery, by Patriarch Alexy II of Moscow in the Holy Trinity Cathedral, Jerusalem.

In 1997 while an official in the Moscow-based Russian mission in Jerusalem, Mark (Golovkov) played a critical role along with then Patriarch Alexy II in convincing Yasser Arafat in expelling the owners of Mount of Olives Monastery, the only Eastern Orthodox monastery and church in the city of Hebron. The church had been under the property of the Russian Church Outside Russia (ROCOR), but after dispute over custody, the hierarchy of the Moscow Patriarchate asked the Palestinian authorities to forcibly remove the current contingent. Mark (Golovkov) spoke to the media, saying: "We're ready to receive them all, but for a long time, the Mount of Olives Monastery did not allow Russian priests to enter. Muslims, Jews, atheists, Buddhists can enter, but God forbid that a Russian priest enter. They must understand that they're not recognized by anyone, and that all the properties they call theirs were built and bought by Russia for Russian money to serve Russian pilgrims. Yet the Russian Patriarch cannot enter the monastery to pray."

December 28, 1999: Made deputy chairman of the Department of External Church Relations (DECR), with responsibility for caring for administrative and practical affairs of DECR, including cooperation with state institutions in various countries.

On 26 January 2000 he was appointed rector of the Holy Trinity Church in Khoroshev, Moscow. On 3 May 2000 he was elevated to the rank of archimandrite.

== Bishop ==
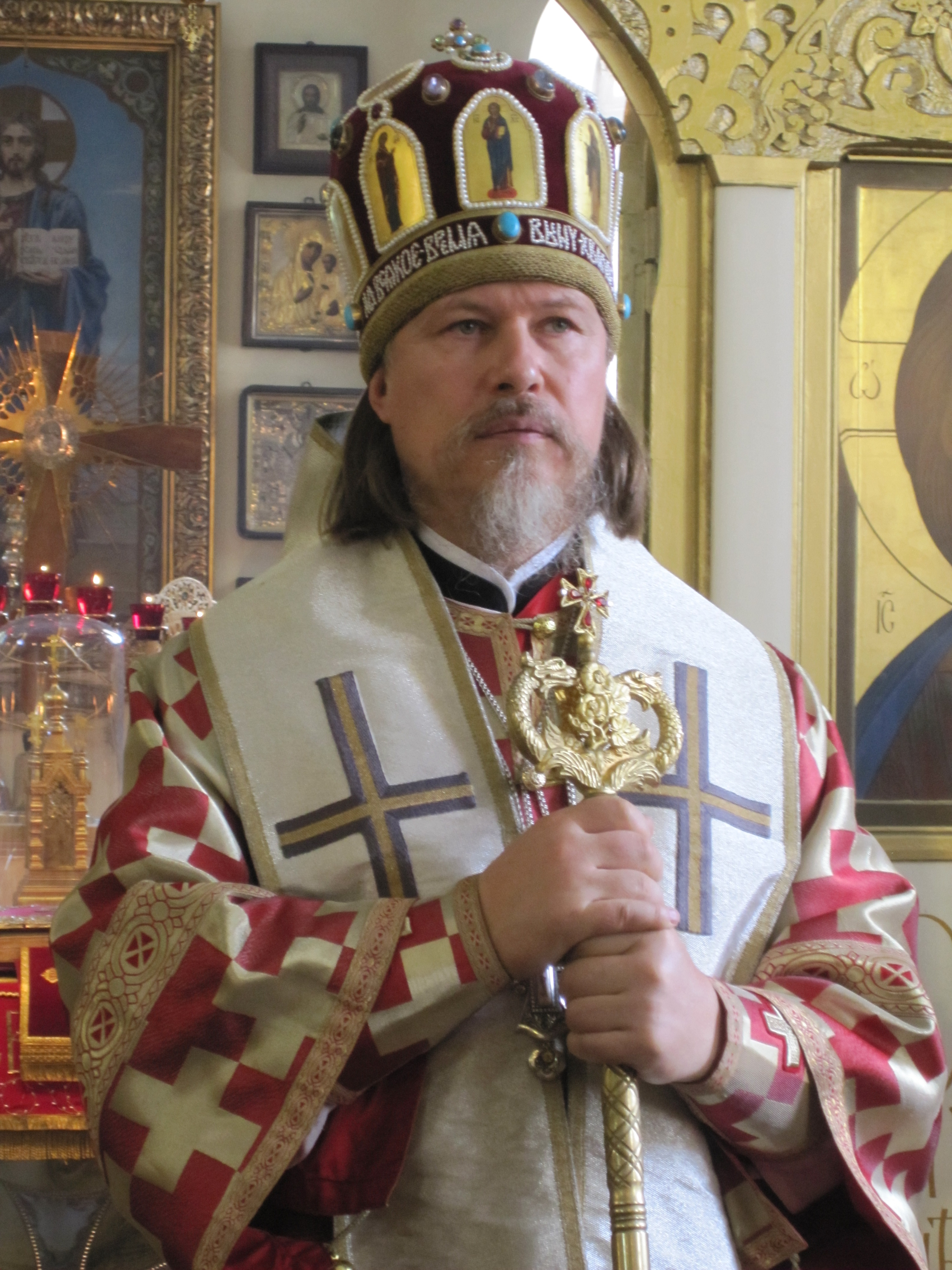
Bishop Mark in May 2012

On 26 December 2003 he was chosen by the Holy Synod of the Russian Orthodox Church to be bishop of Yegoryevsk and vicar of the Moscow diocese. On 14 January 2004, in the Cathedral of Christ the Saviour, he was consecrated bishop of Yegoryevsky and vicar of the Moscow diocese, he was also bestowed his apostolic name Mark by then Metropolitan Kirill (Gundyaev) of Smolensk and Kaliningrad, later Patriarch Kirill of Moscow. On 11 February 2009 he was appointed by Patriarch Kirill as temporarily chairman of the Department of external church relations. On 31 March 2009 the Holy Synod decided to appoint Mark (Golovkov) secretary of the Moscow Patriarchate for foreign institutions. He was also entrusted with the interim administration of the Russian Orthodox dioceses of Vienna-Austria and Budapest-Hungary.

From 16 July 2013 to 22 October 2015 Mark (Golovkov) served as the metropolitan archbishop of the Patriarchal parishes in Italy. He was succeeded by Anthony (Sevryuk) on 26 October 2015.

On 26 February 2019 Mark (Golovkov) was replaced by Ignatius (Deputatov) in the patriarchal administration of the Russian Orthodox church. Along with the resignation of the metropolitan of St. Petersburg, this was seen by some observers and journalists as part of an ongoing trend of Kirill removing old bishops mostly ordained and appointed by his predecessor and replacing them with younger bishops who reflect his personality and views.

On August 30, 2019, by the decision of the Holy Synod, he was appointed ruling hierarch of the diocese of Budapest Hungary with the title "Metropolitan of Budapest and Hungarу" within the specified diocese.

On June 7, 2022, by decision of the Holy Synod, he was released from his duties as administrator of the Budapest-Hungarian diocese. Hilarion (Alfeyev) replaced him

== Views ==
Mark (Golovkov) has written and spoken numerous times about the importance of architecture in the Orthodox church, both in modern times and historical. While supervising the restoration projects of Orthodox religious buildings primarily in Moscow Oblast and Russia as a whole, he spoke of the importance of preserving the historical appearance and atmosphere of these buildings, saying that the architectural traditions are important in Orthodox spirituality.

Mark (Golovkov) was one of many leaders of Christian denominations to express their opposition of Saudi Islamic scholar and cleric Abdul-Aziz ibn Abdullah Al ash-Sheikh, when the latter declared that all churches in the Arabian Peninsula must be destroyed. As then head of the department of Russian Orthodox churches abroad, Mark (Golovkov) called the sheikh's fatwa "alarming" and told the Interfax news agency he hoped that Saudi Arabia's neighbors in the region "will be surprised by the calls made by this sheikh and ignore them".

Mark (Golovkov) has publicly supported the Russian invasion of Ukraine on multiple occasions during visits to Russia. He has blessed military equipment before its dispatch to the front, delegated clergy from the Ryazan Diocese to minister to Russian servicemen fighting in the occupied territories, and encouraged citizens to forcibly mobilise to the front. He also referred disparagingly to Russians who had left the country following the start of the full-scale invasion as a "generation of freeloaders".

== Notes ==
Eastern Orthodox Church titles
Preceded by Veniamin (Zaritsky)	Metropolitan of Ryazan; Diocese of Ryazan and Kasimov; October 2015 —	Succeeded by Incumbent
Preceded by Tikhon (Zaitsev)	Chairman of the Financial and Economic Department of the Moscow Patriarchate; 25 July 2014 — 25 February 2019	Succeeded by Ignatius (Deputatov)
Preceded by Dionysius (Porubay)	Interim manager of the Kasimov diocese 14 July 2018 — 18 November 2018	Succeeded by Vasily (Danilov)
Preceded by Nestor (Sirotenko)	Bishop of Bogorodsk (Parishes of the Russian Orthodox Church in Italy); 16 July 2013 — 22 October 2015	Succeeded by Anthony (Sevryuk)
