= Nestor Sirotenko =

Ex-Archbishop of the Russian Orthodox Diocese of Madrid and Lisbon

- Ex-Archbishop of Spain and Portugal
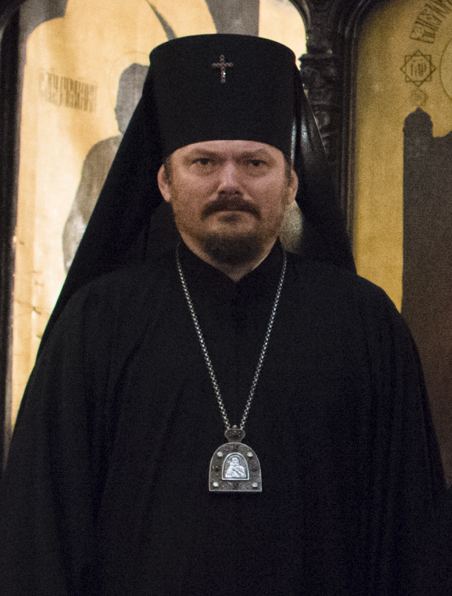
- Bishop Nestor in 2020
- Native name: Нестор
- Church: Russian Orthodox Church
- Successor: Metropolitan Mark of Ryazan and Mikhailov
- Previous posts: Bishop of Chersonesus (2010–2018) Metropolitan of Korsun and Patriarchal Exarch of Western Europe

Orders
- Rank: Archbishop

Personal details
- Born: Yevgeny Yuryevich Sirotenko; 4 September 1974 (age 52) Moscow, Russian SFSR, Soviet Union
- Denomination: Eastern Orthodox Church
- Education: Moscow Theological Academy

Archbishop Nestor (Russian: Архиепископ Нестор, secular name Yevgeny Yuryevich Sirotenko, Russian: Евгений Юрьевич Сиротенко; born 4 September 1974) is a bishop of the Russian Orthodox Church, Ex-Archbishop of Madrid and Lisbon and Patriarchal Exarch of Western Europe.

During 2010–2018 he was Bishop of Chersonesus, responsible for the administration parishes of the Moscow Patriarchate in France, Switzerland, Spain and Portugal. He was then appointed as Metropolitan of Korsun and Patriarchal Exarch of Western Europe, position from which he was deposed in November 2025 as an ecclesiastical trial was started against him. Metropolitan Mark of Ryazan and Mikhailov took his position temporarily.

== Biography ==
He graduated from high school in 1991. In 1991–1995 he studied at Faculty of Informatics of the Moscow State Institute for History and Archives (now Russian State University for the Humanities).

In 1991–1995 he worked at the Ministry of Foreign Economic Relations of the Russian Federation. At the same time, he was an altar boy in the Church of the Transfiguration of the Lord in the village of Peredelkino.

In 1995 he entered the Moscow Theological Seminary. 28 March 1998, Archbishop Eugene (Reshetnikov) of Vereya, rector of the Moscow Theological Academy, tonsured him a monk with the name Nestor in honor of the saint Nestor the Chronicler. On 24 April 1998, Archbishop Eugene of Vereya ordained him hierodeacon in the Pokrovsky church of the Moscow Theological Academy. In 1999 he graduated from the Moscow Theological Seminary and entered the Moscow Theological Academy. On 29 November 1999, Archbishop Eugene of Vereya ordained him hieromonk.

In 2000 he was sent to study at the St. Sergius Orthodox Theological Institute in Paris, and was under the pastoral responsibility of the Archdiocese of Russian Orthodox churches in Western Europe (then subordinated to Patriarchate of Constantinople). In 2001, he was appointed by Archbishop Sergius (Konovalov) of Evkarpia as rector of the Cathedral of Christ the Savior in the city of Asnières-sur-Seine, France. In 2004 he graduated both from the St. Sergius Theological Institute and, as an external student, from the Moscow Theological Academy.

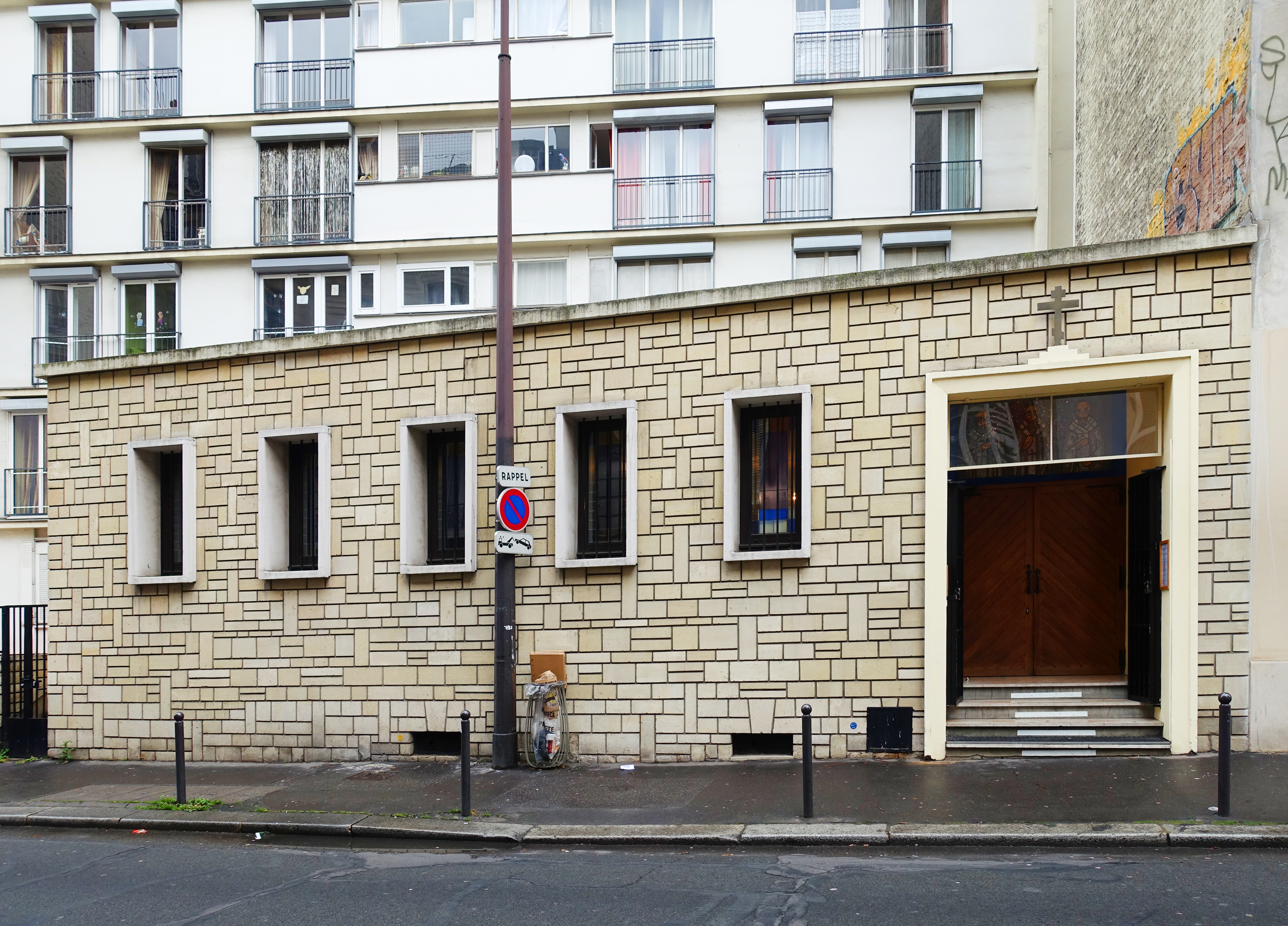
Church of the Three Saint Hierarchs in Paris

On 25 March 2004, by decision of the Holy Synod of the Russian Orthodox Church, he was placed at the disposal of the Archbishop Innocent (Vasilyev) of Chersonesus for appointment to the pastoral Ministry. 10 May of the same year, he was appointed acting rector of the Church of the Three Saints Hierarchs in Paris.

On 15 January 2008 he was appointed dean of the parishes of the Diocese of Chersonesus in France.

In February 2008 Archbishop Innocent of Chersonesus was appointed head of the working group of the diocese of Chersonesus for the construction of a new cathedral in Paris.

In Easter 2008 he was elevated to the rank of hegumen.

On 1 June 2008 he was appointed rector of the Cathedral Church of the Three Saints in Paris.

27–28 January 2009 he participated in Local Council of the Russian Orthodox Church.

In 2009 he was appointed chair of the Disciplinary Council and teacher of pastoral theology at the Paris Theological Seminary.

On 31 May 2010, by decision of the Holy Synod of the Russian Orthodox Church, he was elected vicar of the Diocese of Chersonesus with the title "of Caffa".

On 28 August 2010, in the Dormition Cathedral, Moscow, Patriarch Kirill of Moscow and all Russia elevated him to the rank of Archimandrite. On 4 September of the same year, at the Patriarchal Residence in Chisty Lane, Moscow, Archimandrite Nestor was nominated as Bishop of Caffa, vicar of the diocese of Chersonesus. On 5 September, in the Cathedral Church of Christ the Saviour, he was consecrated Bishop of Caffa, vicar of the diocese of Chersonesus.

On 24 December 2010 the Holy Synod appointed him as ruling hierarch to the Diocese of Chersonesus with the task of managing the Parishes of the Moscow Patriarchate in Italy.

On 16 July 2013, by the decision of the Holy Synod of the Russian Orthodox Church, he was released from the management of parishes of the Moscow Patriarchate in Italy.

On 28 December 2018, by a decision of the Holy Synod, he was appointed administrator of the then established Spanish-Portuguese diocese, which was then separated from the Diocese of Chersonesus, with the title "Bishop of Madrid and Lisbon".

On 3 January 2019 Patriarch Kirill elevated him to the rank of Archbishop in the Dormition Cathedral, Moscow.

In August 2019 he laid the foundation stone for the new Church of the Presentation of the Lord in Adeje (Tenerife, Canary Islands). Which is the third Russian Orthodox temple built in Spain. It is also expected to attend its planned opening for 2020.

It was announced in November 2025 that by Patriarch Kirill's order he was to be subjected to an ecclesiastical trial and deposed from his positions. His place was filled temporarily by Metropolitan Mark of Ryazan and Mikhailovsk.

== Published works ==
- Зерцало смирения // Встреча. 1996. – № 3. – С. 11–12.
- Радуйся, многия в разуме просвещающия // Встреча. 1997. – № 2 (5). – С. 12–14.
- «Мне хочется быть монахом». Жизнеописание Патриарха Алексия I // Встреча. 1997. – № 3 (6). – С. 15–26.
- Августин (Сахаров) // Православная энциклопедия. – М. : Церковно-научный центр «Православная энциклопедия», 2000. – Т. I. – С. 113–114. – 752 с. – 40 000 экз. – ISBN 5-89572-006-4.
- Слово архимандрита Нестора (Сиротенко) при наречении во епископа Кафского, викария Корсунской епархии // patriarchia.ru, 4 сентября 2010
- Ходатай о русском единстве – памяти архипастыря русских приходов в Западной Европе // e-vestnik.ru, 23 января 2013
- Avant propos // Leonide Ouspensky. Le mystere de l’Icône. 1987–2017. – Paris, 2017. – 284 p.
