= Hilarion Alfeyev =

Russian Orthodox bishop (born 1966)

His Eminence Hilarion
- Metropolitan of Budapest and Hungary
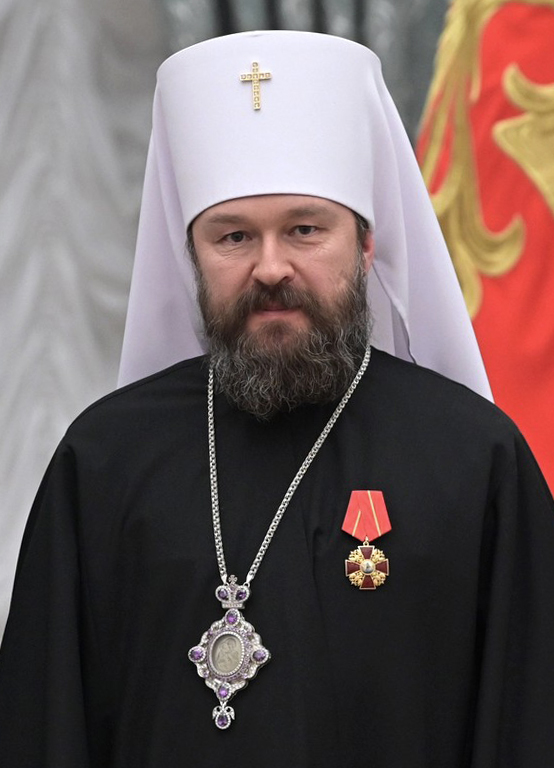
- Metropolitan Hilarion in 2022
- Native name: Иларион
- Church: Russian Orthodox Church
- Diocese: Budapest and Hungary
- Appointed: 7 June 2022
- Retired: 27 December 2024
- Predecessor: Mark (Golovkov)
- Successor: Mark (Golovkov)
- Other posts: Chairman of the Synodal Biblical and Theological Commission (2011‍–‍2024)
- Previous posts: Rector of the church of St. Peter and Paul in Karlovy Vary (2024‍–‍2026); Chairman of the Department for External Church Relations of the Moscow Patriarchate (2009‍–‍2022); Metropolitan of Volokolamsk (2009‍–‍2022); Bishop of Vienna and Austria (2003‍–‍2009)

Orders
- Ordination: 1987
- Consecration: 2002 by Alexy II

Personal details
- Born: Grigoriy Valerievich Alfeyev; Григо́рий Вале́риевич Алфе́ев; 24 July 1966 (age 60) Moscow, Russian SFSR
- Education: Moscow Theological Academy; Pembroke College, Oxford

Hilarion (secular name Grigory Valerievich Alfeyev, Russian: Григо́рий Вале́риевич Алфе́ев; 24 July 1966) is a retired bishop of the Russian Orthodox Church. He has published books on dogmatic theology, patristics and church history and composed music for choir and orchestra.

From 2009 to 2022, he was the titular metropolitan of Volokolamsk and the chairman of the Department for External Church Relations of the Moscow Patriarchate. He was an ex officio permanent member of the Holy Synod of the Russian Orthodox Church, and also served as a seminary administrator.

In June 2022, Hilarion was removed from his position as president of the Department of External Church Relations of the Patriarchate of Moscow and dismissed as Metropolitan of Volokolamsk. He was appointed to the Metropolis of Budapest and Hungary, then suspended from all positions in July 2024, and officially dismissed on 27 December 2024.

== Life ==
Grigory Valerievich Alfeyev was born on 24 July 1966 in Moscow. From 1972 to 1982 he studied violin, piano and composition at the Moscow Gnessins School and from 1983 to 1986 at the Moscow State Conservatoire. From 1984 to 1986 he served in the Soviet military.

In January 1987, after serving in the military, he became a monk (see below under Church activity). In 1989 he graduated from the Moscow Theological Seminary and in 1991 from the Moscow Theological Academy with the degree of Master of Theology.

From 1991 to 1993 he taught various subjects at the Moscow Theological Academy, St Tikhon's Theological Institute and St John the Theologian's Orthodox University.

From 1993 to 1995 he studied at the University of Oxford (UK) under the supervision of Bishop Kallistos Ware. In 1995 he completed his doctoral thesis on "St Symeon the New Theologian and Orthodox Tradition" and was awarded the degree of Doctor of Philosophy. In 1999 he was awarded a second doctorate, a Doctor of Theology, from the Saint Sergius Orthodox Theological Institute in Paris.

=== Church activity ===
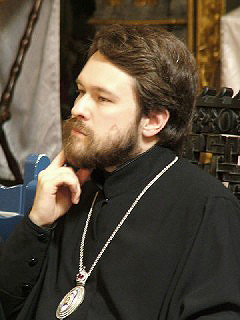
Hilarion (Alfeyev) in 2004

In January 1987 he entered the Monastery of the Holy Spirit in Vilnius, Lithuanian SSR, where he was tonsured as a monk on 19 June, ordained a deacon on 21 June and ordained priest on 19 August in the same year. Until 1991 he served as a parish priest in Lithuania, including two years as dean of Annunciation Cathedral in Kaunas.

On 27 December 2001 he was nominated bishop. On 14 January 2002 he was consecrated by Alexy II, Patriarch of Moscow and all Russia, and 10 other hierarchs.

Appointed Assistant (Vicar) Bishop in the Diocese of Sourozh in the UK, but as a result of an acute conflict situation around him and at Metropolitan Anthony's request, the Holy Synod decided, only a few months later, on 17 July 2002, that he was to be transferred and nominated as Head of the Representation of the Russian Orthodox Church to the European Institutions in Brussels.

On 7 May 2003 appointed Bishop of Vienna and Austria, administrator of the Diocese of Budapest and Hungary.

On 31 March 2009, appointed the Bishop of Volokolamsk, the Vicar to the Patriarch of Moscow and all Russia, the chairman of the Department of the External Church Relations (the position previously held by the current Patriarch Kirill), and a permanent member of the Holy Synod, ex officio.

On Easter Monday, 2009 was raised to an archbishop by Patriarch Kirill during the Divine Liturgy in The Dormition Cathedral of the Moscow Kremlin. On 1 February 2010, at a liturgy to celebrate the first anniversary of the enthronement of Patriarch Kirill of Moscow and All Russia, he was raised to the rank of metropolitan.

In late 2018, Alfeyev visited North Korea, meeting with officials and leading a service at the Church of the Life-Giving Trinity in Pyongyang.

=== Scholarly work ===
Alfeyev is the author of more than a thousand publications, including fourteen monographs in English: St Symeon the New Theologian and Orthodox Tradition (Oxford University Press, 2000), welcomed by the press, The Spiritual World of Isaac the Syrian (Cistercian Publications, Kalamazoo, MI, 2000), The Mystery of Faith. An Introduction to the Teaching and Spirituality of the Orthodox Church (Darton, Longman and Todd, 2002), Orthodox Witness Today (WCC Publications, 2006), Christ the Conqueror of Hell. The Descent into Hell in Orthodox Tradition (St Vladimir's Press, 2009), Orthodox Christianity, vol. 1-5 (St Vladimir's Press, 2011–19), Prayer: Encounter with the Living God (St Vladimir's Press, 2015), Jesus Christ, His Life and Teaching, vols. I-V (St Vladimir's Press, 2019–21). His books have also been widely translated.In 2021, he was awarded the State Prize of the Russian Federation in Literature and Art for his contribution to the development of national culture and educational activity.

=== Musical activity ===
Alfeyev is author of numerous musical compositions. His St Matthew Passion, grand oratorio for soloists, choir and orchestra, received a standing ovation at its performances at the Great Hall of Moscow Conservatory (27 March 2007), at the Auditorium Conciliazione, Rome (29 March 2007), and at St Patrick's Cathedral, Melbourne (28 September 2007). Equally well received was his Christmas Oratorio, performed in Washington, Boston and New York (18–20 December 2007) and later in Moscow (7 and 15 January 2008) and his Stabat Mater (world premiere in January 2012 under the direction of Vladimir Spivakov). On the other hand, a Washington Post review described a 2011 performance of the Oratorio as "banal music that seemed the Russian equivalent of the cheesy carol arrangements by John Rutter". Other critics, however, are more favorable to Alfeyev's music, noting that "while they're not on the level of Johann Sebastian Bach, the compositions are sophisticated, and they're easy on the ear." Some go even further by stating that "the music of composer Hilarion (Alfeyev) is bright, powerful and rigorous, but at the same time it is distinguished by the subtlest lyricism... His compositions penetrate a human soul; they are clear and accessible to everyone." It has also been repeatedly argued that Alfeyev is "one of the most widely performed of all living Russian composers". His music has been performed at concerts more than 300 times in 15 years, in Russia and abroad.

=== Ecumenical activity ===
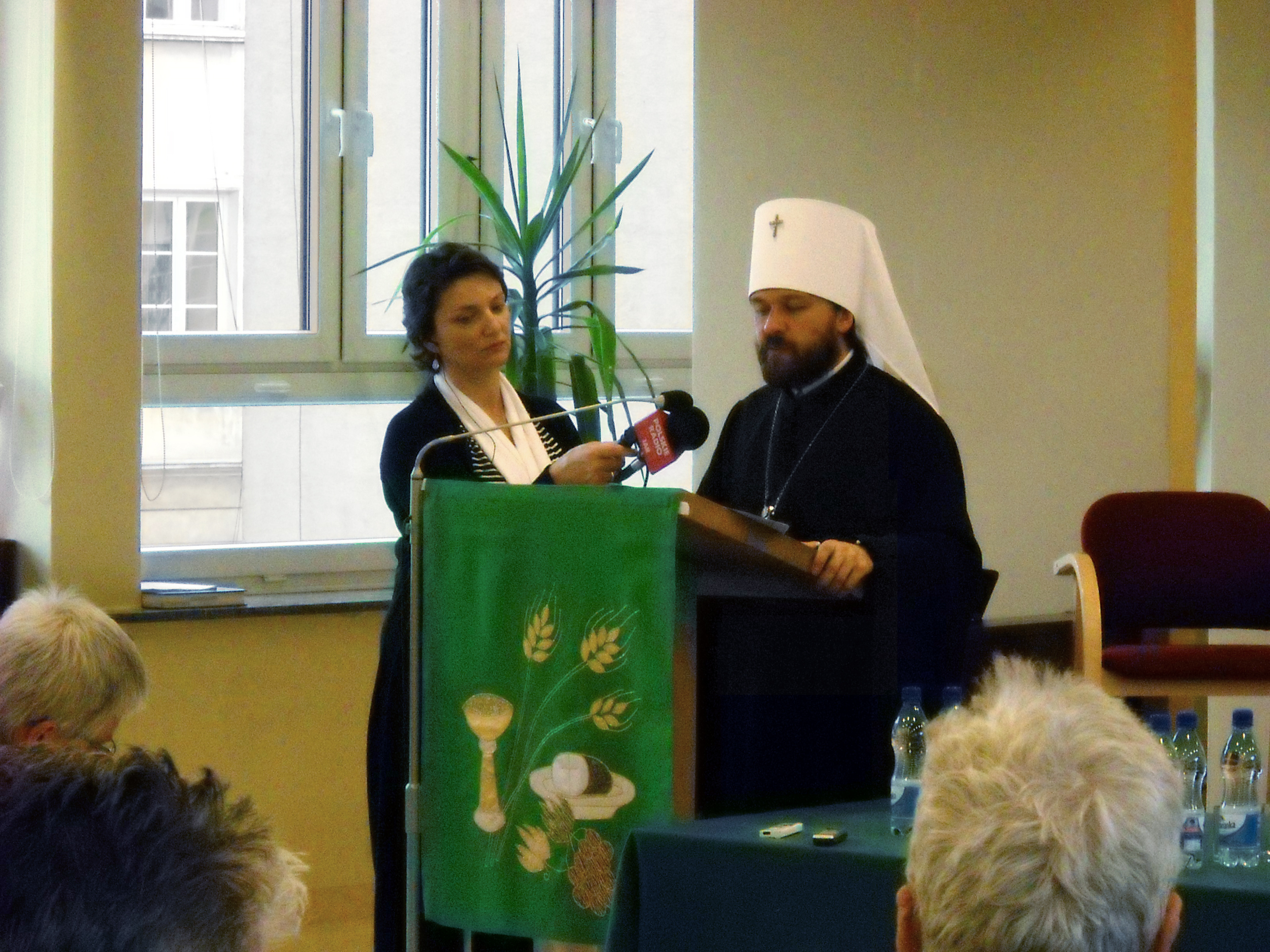
Metropolitan Hilarion speaking at the Christian Theological Academy in Warsaw in 2010

Alfeyev was a member of the Executive and Central Committees of the World Council of Churches, of the Presidium of 'Faith and Order' Commission, as well as of numerous bilateral theological dialogues.

Alfeyev was a member of the Joint International Commissions for the Theological Dialogue between the Eastern Orthodox Church and the Catholic Church, between the Eastern Orthodox Church and the Anglican Communion, and between the Eastern Orthodox Church and the World Alliance of Reformed Churches. He is also interested in interfaith dialogue among all major world religions, and currently sits on the Board of World Religious Leaders for the Elijah Interfaith Institute.

On 10 October 2007, Alfeyev walked out of an important meeting of the Orthodox–Catholic International Theological Commission in Ravenna in protest against the choice of delegates by the Ecumenical Patriarchate. His action was approved by the Holy Synod of the Russian Orthodox Church.

On 5 October 2008, Alfeyev took part in the "Bible marathon" organized by the Italian state TV channel RAI-Uno. He read Chapter Two from the Book of Genesis, immediately following Pope Benedict XVI, who read Chapter One.

Late in 2010, Alfeyev spoke to senior Anglican bishops and professors at the Nikean Club dinner at Lambeth Palace, criticizing proposals for the ordination of women as bishops and the toleration of homosexual activity by some Anglicans.

In April 2017, he expressed his approval of the Supreme Court of Russia's decision to ban Jehovah's Witnesses from worship anywhere in the Russian Federation. He claims that "they erode the psyche of people and the family" (e.g. disfellowshiping), and that those Witnesses' beliefs which do not coincide with those of the Orthodox Church, such as the rejection of the doctrine of the Trinity, are reason to outlaw their religion.

=== Dismissal, transfer and retirement ===
In March 2022, the Commission of the Bishops' Conferences of the European Union (COMECE) wrote a letter to Patriarch Kirill of Moscow, asking him to condemn the Russian invasion of Ukraine. In response, Hilarion responded, saying that "we call upon everyone to pray fervently for the cessation of every military confrontation between Russia and Ukraine". On 11 March 2022, the University of Fribourg suspended Hilarion from his academic positions due to his failure to condemn the invasion.

In June 2022, following a meeting of the Holy Synod of the Russian Orthodox Church, Hilarion was removed from his position as president of the Department of External Church Relations of the Patriarchate of Moscow and dismissed as Metropolitan of Volokolamsk. He was appointed to the Metropolis of Budapest-Hungary. Many Western media have speculated that his dismissal and transfer were due to pressure from the Russian government because of Hilarion's refusal to back the war.

In July 2024, the Holy Synod of the Russian Orthodox Church suspended Hilarion from his position as metropolitan of Budapest and Hungary, pending an investigation, following the 2024 accusations of sexual abuse by his cell-attendant, who is also referred to as an intern or sub-deacon. The accuser supported his allegations with audio recordings. He shared photographs showing Hilarion enjoying a luxurious lifestyle including yachting and skiing, and his ownership of an estate near Budapest. He also had a photograph of a Hungarian passport Hilarion had received within just three months of arriving there. On 27 December 2024, Hilarion was retired from his position as Metropolitan of Budapest and Hungary. Hilarion has denied the allegations, calling them part of an extortion plot. Rowan Williams, the former Archbishop of Canterbury, told the BBC: "Given the way Putin's regime operates, it would hardly be surprising if, in addition to his dramatic demotion in ecclesiastical terms, there had also been a determination to make sure that his reputation was damaged in whatever ways could be arranged. The full facts remain unclear, but there is a Kremlin modus operandi that seems recognisable here."

=== In the Czech Republic ===
He was the rector of the Church of Saint Peter and Paul in Karlovy Vary, Czech Republic, from December 2024 to May 2026.

In May 2026, he was arrested for having "white powder" in his car. He denied the accusations and was released two days after his arrest without bail, a travel ban, or any other restrictions. No charges were filed against him.

=== Back to Russia ===
By decree of Patriarch Kirill dated 3 June 2026, he was assigned to the Eparchy of Argentina and South America, to serve in Rio Grande do Sul, Brazil, as the rector of the Church of the Holy Apostles Peter and Paul in Santa Rosa as well as the Church of the Holy Apostle and Evangelist John the Theologian in Campina das Missões. This decree was temporarily suspended as of 31 July 2026 to allow him to care for his elderly mother.

== Selected discography ==
1. Metropolitan Hilarion Alfeyev. St Matthew Passion. Tchaikovsky Symphony Orchestra of Moscow Radio. Conductor Vladimir Fedoseyev. 2 CD. Relief Publisher (2011). CR 991094.
2. Metropolitan Hilarion Alfeyev. St Matthew Passion. Tchaikovsky Symphony Orchestra, Moscow Synodal Choir. Conductor Vladimir Fedoseyev. 2 CD. Vista Vera (2012). ASIN: B008J3ME8G.
3. Metropolitan Hilarion Alfeyev. St Matthew Passion. Tchaikovsky Symphony Orchestra, Moscow Synodal Choir. Conductor Vladimir Fedoseyev. 2 CD. Melodiya Recordings (2014).
4. Metropolitan Hilarion Alfeyev. De Profundis. Compositions for orchestra and choir. Stabat Mater, Concerto grosso, Fugue on the B-A-C-H motif, Canciones de la muerte, De profundis. Moscow Synodal Choir, Russian National Orchestra. Conducted by Metropolitan Hilarion Alfeyev. PENTATONE PTC 5186486 (2015).
5. Metropolitan Hilarion Alfeyev. Stabat Mater/A Song of Ascents/Christmas Oratorio. National Philharmonic Orchestra of Russia. Conductor Vladimir Spivakov. 2 CD. MEL CD 1002419. Melodiya Recordings (2016).
6. Metropolitan Hilarion Alfeyev. The Divine Liturgy. SVS Press (2016). ISBN 978-0-881-41062-4.
7. Bach. Ich ruf' zu Dir, Herr Jesu Christ. Russian National Orchestra. Conductor Metropolitan Hilarion Alfeyev. Soloist Stephan Genz. PENTATONE PTC 5186593 (2017).
8. Metropolitan Hilarion Alfeyev. Music for Orchestra and Choir. 6 CD. MEL CD 1002473. Melodiya Recordings (2017).
9. Metropolitan Hilarion Alfeyev. St Matthew Passion. English Version. Moscow Synodal Choir, Russian National Orchestra. Conductor Metropolitan Hilarion Alfeyev. 2 CD. MEL CD 1002531. Melodiya Recordings (2020).
10. Metropolitan Hilarion Alfeyev. Liturgical Chants. Masters of Choral Singing. Conductor Lev Kontorovich. MEL CD 1002681. Melodiya Recordings (2022).
11. Brahms. Variations on a Theme by Haydn & Symphony No. 4. The Moscow State Symphony Orchestra. Conductor Metropolitan Hilarion Alfeyev. MEL CD 1002683. Melodiya Recordings (2022).

== Bibliography ==
Books only:

=== In English ===
1. Alfeyev, Hilarion (2000), St Symeon the New Theologian and Orthodox Tradition, Oxford: Oxford University Press.
2. ——— (2000), The Spiritual World of Isaac the Syrian, Cistercian Studies, Kalamazoo, MI: Cistercian Publications.
3. ——— (2002), The Mystery of Faith. Introduction to the Teaching and Spirituality of the Orthodox Church, London: Darton, Longman & Todd.
4. ——— (2006), Orthodox Witness in a Modern Age, Geneva: WCC Publications.
5. ——— (2009), Christ the Conqueror of Hell. The Descent into Hell in Orthodox Tradition, New York: SVS Press.
6. ——— (2011), Orthodox Christianity, vol. I. The History and Canonical Structure of the Orthodox Church, New York: SVS Press.
7. ——— (2012), Orthodox Christianity, vol. II. Doctrine and Teaching of the Orthodox Church, New York: SVS Press.
8. ——— (2014), Orthodox Christianity, vol. III. The Architecture, Icons and Music of the Orthodox Church, New York: SVS Press.
9. ——— (2017), Orthodox Christianity, vol. IV. The Worship and Liturgical Life of the Orthodox Church, New York: SVS Press.
10. ——— (2018), Jesus Christ His Life and Teaching, vol. 1 The Beginning of the Gospel, New York: SVS Press.
11. ——— (2019), Orthodox Christianity, vol. V. Sacraments and Other Rites, New York: SVS Press.
12. ——— (2020), Jesus Christ His Life and Teaching, vol. 2 The Sermon on the Mount, New York: SVS Press.
13. ——— (2021), Jesus Christ His Life and Teaching, vol. 3 The Miracles of Jesus, New York: SVS Press.
14. ——— (2021), Jesus Christ His Life and Teaching, vol. 4 The Parables of Jesus, New York: SVS Press.
15. ——— (2022), Jesus Christ His Life and Teaching, vol. 5 The Lamb of God, New York: SVS Press.
- ——— (2024), Catechism: A Short Guide to Orthodox Christianity, New York: SVS Press, ISBN 978-0-88141-706-7.

== Musical compositions ==
1. Alfeyev, Grigory (1984), Four Poems by Federico Garcia Lorca (voice and piano).
2. Alfeyev, Hilarion (2006), The Divine Liturgy (mixed choir).
3. ——— (2006), The All-Night Vigil (soloists and mixed choir).
4. ——— (2006), St Matthew Passion (soloists, choir and orchestra).
5. ——— (2007), Christmas Oratorio (soloists, boys' choir, mixed choir and symphony orchestra).
6. ——— (2007), Memento (symphony orchestra).
7. ——— (2008), A Song of the Ascents (symphony on the Psalms; choir and orchestra).
8. ——— (2012), Stabat Mater; première under the direction of Vladimir Spivakov.
9. ——— (2012), Fugue on a BACH Motif (orchestra).
