= Eparchies and metropolitanates of the Russian Orthodox Church =

This is the list of the metropolitanates and eparchies (dioceses) of the Russian Orthodox Church.

== Russia ==
Eparchies and metropolitanates of the Russian Orthodox Church in the Russian Federation:

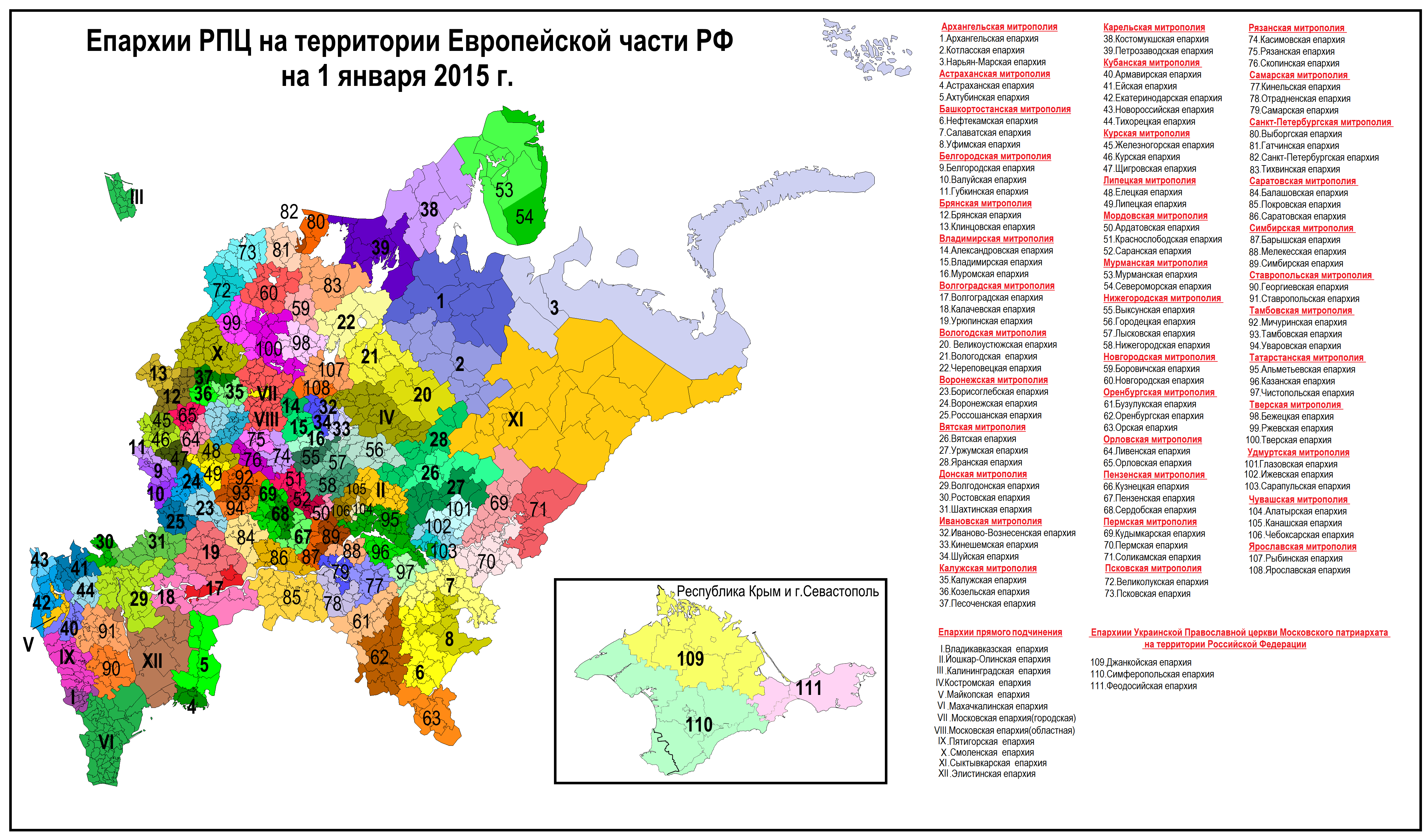
Eparchies in the European Russia as of 1 January 2015

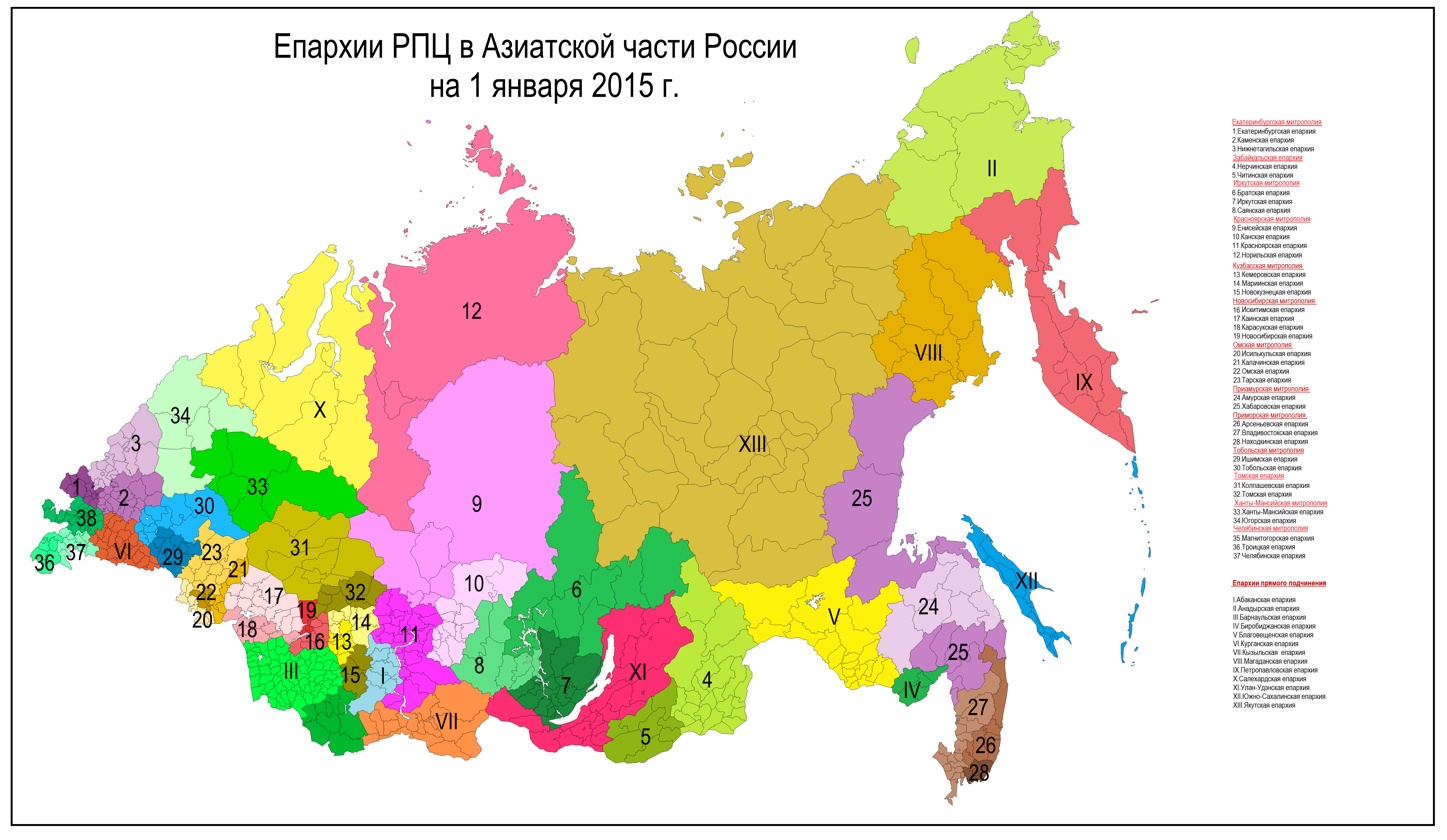
Eparchies in the Asian Russia as of 1 January 2015

Eparchy	See	Founded	Official site	Metropolitanate	See	Founded
Barnaul	Barnaul	1930		Altai	Barnaul	2015
Biysk	Biysk	1919		Altai	Barnaul	2015
Rubtsovsk	Rubtsovsk	2015		Altai	Barnaul	2015
Slavgorod	Slavgorod	2015		Altai	Barnaul	2015
Arkhangelsk	Arkhangelsk	1628		Arkhangelsk	Arkhangelsk	2011
Kotlas	Kotlas	2011		Arkhangelsk	Arkhangelsk	2011
Naryan-Mar	Naryan-Mar	2011		Arkhangelsk	Arkhangelsk	2011
Plesetsk	Plesetsk	2017		Arkhangelsk	Arkhangelsk	2011
Akhtubinsk	Akhtubinsk	2013		Astrakhan	Astrakhan	2013
Astrakhan	Astrakhan	1602		Astrakhan	Astrakhan	2013
Birsk	Birsk	2017		Bashkortostan	Ufa	2011
Neftekamsk	Neftekamsk	2011		Bashkortostan	Ufa	2011
Salavat	Salavat	2011		Bashkortostan	Ufa	2011
Ufa	Ufa	1799		Bashkortostan	Ufa	2011
Belgorod	Belgorod	1667		Belgorod	Belgorod	2012
Gubkin	Gubkin	2012		Belgorod	Belgorod	2012
Valuyki	Valuyki	2012		Belgorod	Belgorod	2012
Bryansk	Bryansk	1920		Bryansk	Bryansk	2013
Klintsy	Klintsy	2013		Bryansk	Bryansk	2013
Severobaykalsk	Severobaykalsk	2015		Buryatia	Ulan-Ude	2015
Ulan-Ude	Ulan-Ude	1933		Buryatia	Ulan-Ude	2015
Chelyabinsk	Chelyabinsk	1918		Chelyabinsk	Chelyabinsk	2012
Magnitogorsk	Magnitogorsk	2012		Chelyabinsk	Chelyabinsk	2012
Troitsk	Troitsk	2012		Chelyabinsk	Chelyabinsk	2012
Zlatoust	Zlatoust	2016		Chelyabinsk	Chelyabinsk	2012
Alatyr	Alatyr	2012		Chuvashia	Cheboksary	2012
Cheboksary	Cheboksary	1945		Chuvashia	Cheboksary	2012
Kanash	Kanash	2012		Chuvashia	Cheboksary	2012
Rostov and Novocherkassk	Rostov-on-Don	1919		Don	Rostov-on-Don	2011
Shakhty	Shakhty	2011		Don	Rostov-on-Don	2011
Volgodonsk	Volgodonsk	2011		Don	Rostov-on-Don	2011
Ivanovo-Voznesensk	Ivanovo	1920		Ivanovo	Ivanovo	2012
Kineshma	Kineshma	2012		Ivanovo	Ivanovo	2012
Shuya	Shuya	2012		Ivanovo	Ivanovo	2012
Bratsk	Bratsk	2011		Irkutsk	Irkutsk	2011
Irkutsk	Irkutsk	1721		Irkutsk	Irkutsk	2011
Sayansk	Sayansk	2011		Irkutsk	Irkutsk	2011
Chernyakhovsk	Chernyakhovsk	2016		Kaliningrad	Kaliningrad	2016
Kaliningrad	Kaliningrad	2009		Kaliningrad	Kaliningrad	2016
Kaluga	Kaluga	1799		Kaluga	Kaluga	2013
Kozelsk	Kozelsk	2013		Kaluga	Kaluga	2013
Pesochnya	Kirov	2013		Kaluga	Kaluga	2013
Kostomuksha	Kostomuksha	2013		Karelia	Petrozavodsk	2013
Petrozavodsk	Petrozavodsk	1828		Karelia	Petrozavodsk	2013
Khanty-Mansiysk	Khanty-Mansiysk	2011		Khanty-Mansiysk	Khanty-Mansiysk	2014
Yugorsk	Yugorsk	2014		Khanty-Mansiysk	Khanty-Mansiysk	2014
Galich	Galich	2016		Kostroma	Kostroma	2016
Kostroma	Kostroma	1744		Kostroma	Kostroma	2016
Kansk	Kansk	2011		Krasnoyarsk	Krasnoyarsk	2011
Krasnoyarsk	Krasnoyarsk	1861		Krasnoyarsk	Krasnoyarsk	2011
Minusinsk	Minusinsk	1923		Krasnoyarsk	Krasnoyarsk	2011
Norilsk	Norilsk	2014		Krasnoyarsk	Krasnoyarsk	2011
Yeniseysk	Yeniseysk	2011		Krasnoyarsk	Krasnoyarsk	2011
Armavir	Armavir	2013		Kuban	Krasnodar	2013
Novorossiysk	Novorossiysk	1919		Kuban	Krasnodar	2013
Sochi	Sochi	2018		Kuban	Krasnodar	2013
Tikhoretsk	Tikhoretsk	2013		Kuban	Krasnodar	2013
Yekaterinodar	Krasnodar	1919		Kuban	Krasnodar	2013
Yeysk	Yeysk	2013		Kuban	Krasnodar	2013
Kurgan	Kurgan	1993		Kurgan	Kurgan	2015
Shadrinsk	Shadrinsk	2015		Kurgan	Kurgan	2015
Kursk	Kursk	1833		Kursk	Kursk	2012
Shchigry	Shchigry	2012		Kursk	Kursk	2012
Zheleznogorsk	Zheleznogorsk	2012		Kursk	Kursk	2012
Kemerovo	Kemerovo	1993		Kuzbass	Kemerovo	2012
Mariinsk	Mariinsk	2012		Kuzbass	Kemerovo	2012
Novokuznetsk	Novokuznetsk	2012		Kuzbass	Kemerovo	2012
Lipetsk	Lipetsk	2003		Lipetsk	Lipetsk	2013
Yelets	Yelets	2013		Lipetsk	Lipetsk	2013
Volzhsk	Volzhsk	2017		Mari El	Yoshkar-Ola	2017
Yoshkar-Ola	Yoshkar-Ola	1993		Mari El	Yoshkar-Ola	2017
Blalashikha	Balashikha	2021		Moscow	Moscow	2021
Kolomna	Kolomna	1350		Moscow	Moscow	2021
Odintsovo	Odintsovo	2021		Moscow	Moscow	2021
Podolsk	Podolsk	2021		Moscow	Moscow	2021
Sergiyev Posad	Sergiyev Posad	2021		Moscow	Moscow	2021
Ardatov	Ardatov	2011		Mordovia	Saransk	2011
Krasnoslobodsk	Krasnoslobodsk	2011		Mordovia	Saransk	2011
Saransk	Saransk	1991		Mordovia	Saransk	2011
Murmansk	Murmansk	1995		Murmansk	Murmansk	2013
Severomorsk	Severomorsk	2013		Murmansk	Murmansk	2013
Gorodets	Gorodets	2012		Nizhny Novgorod	Nizhny Novgorod	2012
Lyskovo	Lyskovo	2012		Nizhny Novgorod	Nizhny Novgorod	2012
Nizhny Novgorod	Nizhny Novgorod	1672		Nizhny Novgorod	Nizhny Novgorod	2012
Vyksa	Vyksa	2012		Nizhny Novgorod	Nizhny Novgorod	2012
Borovichi	Borovichi	1934		Novgorod	Veliky Novgorod	2011
Novgorod and Staraya Russa	Veliky Novgorod	992		Novgorod	Veliky Novgorod	2011
Iskitim	Iskitim	2011		Novosibirsk	Novosibirsk	2011
Kainsk	Kuybyshev	2011		Novosibirsk	Novosibirsk	2011
Karasuk	Karasuk	2011		Novosibirsk	Novosibirsk	2011
Novosibirsk	Novosibirsk	1924		Novosibirsk	Novosibirsk	2011
Isilkul	Isilkul	2012		Omsk	Omsk	2012
Kalachinsk	Kalachinsk	2012		Omsk	Omsk	2012
Omsk	Omsk	1895		Omsk	Omsk	2012
Tara	Tara	2012		Omsk	Omsk	2012
Buzuluk	Buzuluk	2011		Orenburg	Orenburg	2011
Orenburg	Orenburg	1859		Orenburg	Orenburg	2011
Orsk	Orsk	2011		Orenburg	Orenburg	2011
Livny	Livny	2014		Oryol	Oryol	2014
Oryol	Oryol	1788		Oryol	Oryol	2014
Kuznetsk	Kuznetsk	1929		Penza	Penza	2012
Penza	Penza	1799		Penza	Penza	2012
Serdobsk	Serdobsk	2012		Penza	Penza	2012
Kudymkar	Kudymkar	2014		Perm	Perm	2014
Perm	Perm	1799		Perm	Perm	2014
Solikamsk	Solikamsk	2014		Perm	Perm	2014
Amur	Komsomolsk-on-Amur	2011		Priamurye	Khabarovsk	2011
Khabarovsk	Khabarovsk	1945		Priamurye	Khabarovsk	2011
Vanino	Vanino	2016		Priamurye	Khabarovsk	2011
Arsenyev	Arsenyev	2011		Primorye	Vladivostok	2011
Nakhodka	Nakhodka	2011		Primorye	Vladivostok	2011
Vladivostok	Vladivostok	1898		Primorye	Vladivostok	2011
Pskov and Porkhov	Pskov	1589		Pskov	Pskov	2014
Velikiye Luki	Velikiye Luki	1926		Pskov	Pskov	2014
Kasimov	Kasimov	2011		Ryazan	Ryazan	2011
Ryazan	Ryazan	1291		Ryazan	Ryazan	2011
Skopin	Skopin	2011		Ryazan	Ryazan	2011
Kinel	Kinel	2012		Samara	Samara	2012
Otradny	Otradny	2012		Samara	Samara	2012
Samara	Samara	1850		Samara	Samara	2012
Syzran	Syzran	2017		Samara	Samara	2012
Tolyatti	Tolyatti	2019		Samara	Samara	2012
Gatchina	Gatchina	2013		Saint Petersburg	Saint Petersburg	2013
Saint Petersburg	Saint Petersburg	1742		Saint Petersburg	Saint Petersburg	2013
Tikhvin	Tikhvin	2013		Saint Petersburg	Saint Petersburg	2013
Vyborg	Vyborg	1892		Saint Petersburg	Saint Petersburg	2013
Balashov	Balashov	2011		Saratov	Saratov	2011
Pokrovsk	Engels	2011		Saratov	Saratov	2011
Saratov and Volsk	Saratov	1828		Saratov	Saratov	2011
Barysh	Barysh	2012		Simbirsk	Ulyanovsk	2012
Melekess	Dimitrovgrad	2012		Simbirsk	Ulyanovsk	2012
Simbirsk	Ulyanovsk	1832		Simbirsk	Ulyanovsk	2012
Roslavl	Roslavl	2017		Smolensk	Smolensk	2015
Smolensk	Smolensk	1137		Smolensk	Smolensk	2015
Vyazma	Vyazma	2015		Smolensk	Smolensk	2015
Georgiyevsk	Georgiyevsk	2012		Stavropol	Stavropol	2012
Pyatigorsk	Pyatigorsk	1927		Stavropol	Stavropol	2012
Stavropol	Stavropol	1842		Stavropol	Stavropol	2012
Syktyvkar	Syktyvkar	1995		Syktyvkar	Syktyvkar	2025
Vorkuta	Vorkuta	2016		Syktyvkar	Syktyvkar	2025
Michurinsk	Michurinsk	2012		Tambov	Tambov	2012
Tambov	Tambov	1682		Tambov	Tambov	2012
Uvarovo	Uvarovo	2012		Tambov	Tambov	2012
Almetyevsk	Almetyevsk	2012		Tatarstan	Kazan	2012
Chistopol	Chistopol	2012		Tatarstan	Kazan	2012
Kazan	Kazan	1555		Tatarstan	Kazan	2012
Naberezhnye Chelny	Naberezhnye Chelny	2024		Tatarstan	Kazan	2012
Chita	Chita	1894		Transbaikal	Chita	2014
Nerchinsk	Nerchinsk	2014		Transbaikal	Chita	2014
Ishim	Ishim	2013		Tobolsk	Tobolsk	2013
Tobolsk	Tobolsk	1620		Tobolsk	Tobolsk	2013
Kolpashevo	Kolpashevo	2013		Tomsk	Tomsk	2013
Tomsk	Tomsk	1832		Tomsk	Tomsk	2013
Belyov	Belyov	2011		Tula	Tula	2011
Tula	Tula	1799		Tula	Tula	2011
Bezhetsk	Bezhetsk	2011		Tver	Tver	2011
Rzhev	Rzhev	2011		Tver	Tver	2011
Tver and Kashin	Tver	1271		Tver	Tver	2011
Glazov	Glazov	2013		Udmurtia	Izhevsk	2013
Izhevsk	Izhevsk	1921		Udmurtia	Izhevsk	2013
Sarapul	Sarapul	1918		Udmurtia	Izhevsk	2013
Alexandrov	Alexandrov	2013		Vladimir	Vladimir	2013
Murom	Murom	1198		Vladimir	Vladimir	2013
Vladimir	Vladimir	1214		Vladimir	Vladimir	2013
Kalach	Kalach-na-Donu	2012		Volgograd	Volgograd	2012
Uryupinsk	Uryupinsk	2012		Volgograd	Volgograd	2012
Volgograd	Volgograd	1918		Volgograd	Volgograd	2012
Cherepovets	Cherepovets	1931		Vologda	Vologda	2014
Veliky Ustyug	Veliky Ustyug	1682		Vologda	Vologda	2014
Vologda	Vologda	1556		Vologda	Vologda	2014
Borisoglebsk	Borisoglebsk	2013		Voronezh	Voronezh	2013
Rossosh	Rossosh	2013		Voronezh	Voronezh	2013
Voronezh	Voronezh	1682		Voronezh	Voronezh	2013
Urzhum	Urzhum	2012		Vyatka	Kirov	2012
Vyatka	Kirov	1657		Vyatka	Kirov	2012
Yaransk	Yaransk	2012		Vyatka	Kirov	2012
Pereslavl	Pereslavl-Zalessky	1744		Yaroslavl	Yaroslavl	2012
Rybinsk	Rybinsk	2012		Yaroslavl	Yaroslavl	2012
Yaroslavl and Rostov	Yaroslavl	991		Yaroslavl	Yaroslavl	2012
Alapayevsk	Alapayevsk	2018		Yekaterinburg	Yekaterinburg	2011
Kamensk	Kamensk-Uralsky	2011		Yekaterinburg	Yekaterinburg	2011
Nizhny Tagil	Nizhny Tagil	2011		Yekaterinburg	Yekaterinburg	2011
Serov	Serov	2018		Yekaterinburg	Yekaterinburg	2011
Yekaterinburg	Yekaterinburg	1885		Yekaterinburg	Yekaterinburg	2011
Abakan and Khakassia	Abakan	1995				
Anadyr	Anadyr	2000				
Birobidzhan	Birobidzhan	2002				
Blagoveshchensk	Blagoveshchensk	1858				
Elista	Elista	1995				
Gorno-Altaysk	Gorno-Altaysk	2013				
Grozny	Grozny	2025				
Kyzyl	Kyzyl	2011				
Magadan	Magadan	1991				
Makhachkala	Makhachkala	2012				
Maykop	Maykop	1994				
Moscow City	Moscow	1461				
Petropavlovsk and Kamchatka	Petropavlovsk-Kamchatsky	1922				
Salekhard	Salekhard	2011				
Vladikavkaz	Vladikavkaz	1885				
Yakutsk	Yakutsk	1870				
Yuzhno-Sakhalinsk	Yuzhno-Sakhalinsk	1993				

== Belarus ==
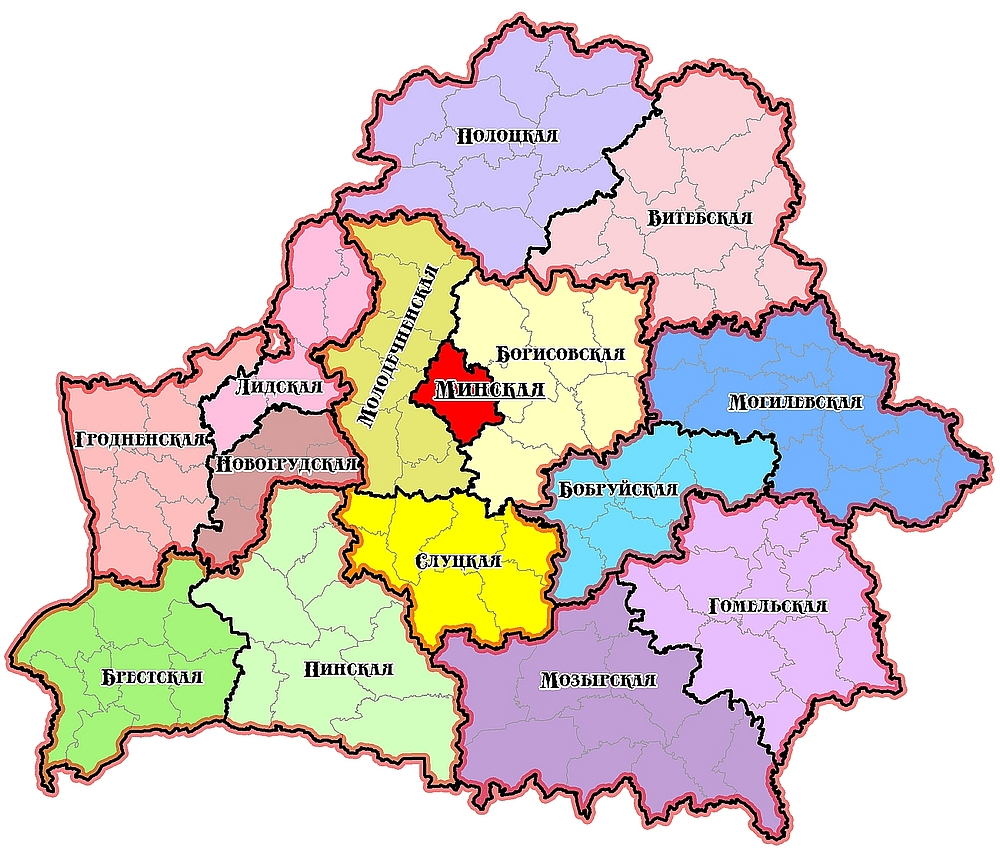
Eparchies of the Belarusian Orthodox Church

Eparchies of the Belarusian Exarchate of the Russian Orthodox Church in Belarus:

Eparchy	See	Founded	Official site	Metropolitanate	See	Founded	Official site
Barysaw	Barysaw	2014		Minsk	Minsk	2014	
Minsk	Minsk	1793		Minsk	Minsk	2014	
Maladzyechna	Maladzyechna	2014		Minsk	Minsk	2014	
Slutsk	Slutsk	2014		Minsk	Minsk	2014	
Babruysk and Bykhaw	Babruysk	2004					
Brest and Kobrin	Brest	1990					
Vitebsk and Orsha	Vitebsk	1563					
Gomel and Zhlobin	Gomel	1990					
Grodno and Vawkavysk	Grodno	1900					
Lida	Lida	1632					
Mogilev and Mstislavl	Mogilev	1632					
Novogrudok and Slonim	Navahrudak	1415					
Pinsk and Luninets	Pinsk	1328					
Polotsk and Hlybokaye	Polotsk	992					
Turov and Mazyr	Mazyr	1005					

== Ukraine ==
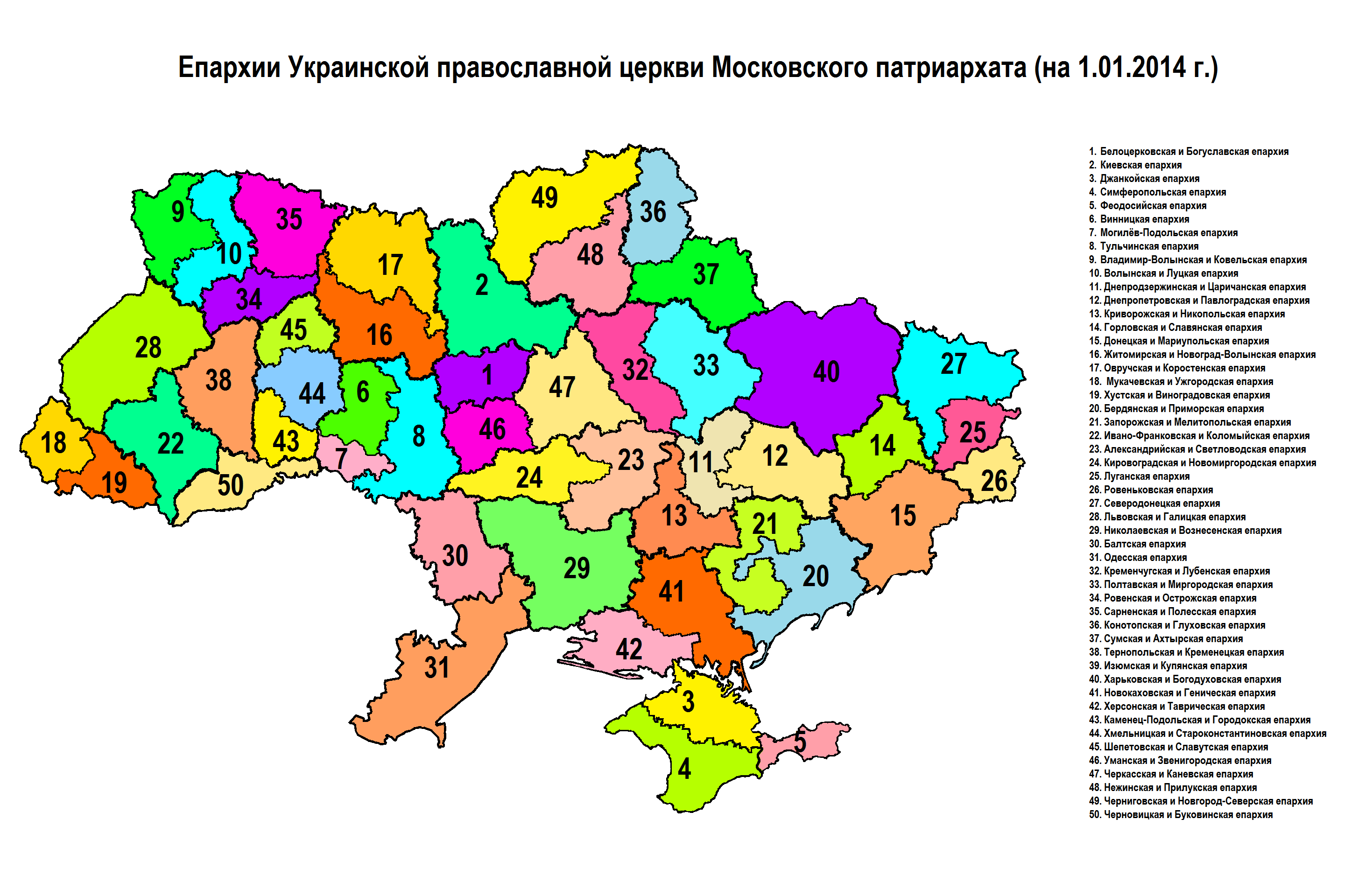
Eparchies of Ukrainian Orthodox Church (Moscow Patriarchate) as of a January 2014

Eparchies of Ukrainian Orthodox Church (Moscow Patriarchate) (and its predecessor Exarchate of Ukraine): In May 2022 the Ukrainian Orthodox Church (Moscow Patriarchate) itself announced its separation from the Moscow Patriarchate and excluded ‘any provisions that at least somehow hinted at or indicated the connection with Moscow’ (following the 2022 Russian invasion of Ukraine); the Russian Orthodox Church continues to claim jurisdiction over Ukraine.

Eparchy	See	Founded	Official site
Kyiv	Kyiv	1678–1770 1921–	
Lutsk and Volhynia	Lutsk	1678–1770 1921–	
Lviv and Galicia	Lviv	1678–1770 1921–	
Chernihiv and Novhorod-Siverskyi	Chernihiv	1678–1770 1921–	
Dnipropetrovsk and Pavlohrad	Dnipro	1921 (1775)	
Kamianets-Podilskyi and Horodok	Kamianets-Podilskyi	1921 (1795)	
Odesa and Izmail	Odesa	1921 (1837)	
Poltava and Myrhorod	Poltava	1921 (1799)	
Simferopol and Crimea	Simferopol	1921 (1859)–1936 1944–2022	
Kharkiv and Bohodukhiv	Kharkiv	1921 (1799)	
Kherson and Tavriisk	Kherson	1921 (1837)	
Vinnytsia	Vinnytsia	1933	
Zhytomyr and Novohrad-Volynskyi	Zhytomyr	1940	
Chernivtsi and Bukovina	Chernivtsi	1941	
Kirovohrad and Novomyrhorod	Kropyvnytskyi	1942	
Sumy and Okhtyrka	Sumy	1943	
Donetsk and Mariupol	Donetsk	1944	
Izmail and Bolhrad	Izmail	1945–1955	
Mukachevo and Uzhhorod	Mukachevo	1945	
Drohobych and Sambor	Drohobych	1946–1959	
Khmelnytskyi and Starokostiantyniv	Khmelnytskyi	1955	
Ivano-Frankivsk and Kolomyia	Ivano-Frankivsk	1957	
Ternopil and Kremenets	Ternopil	1988	
Rivne and Ostrog	Rivne	1990	
Luhansk and Alchevsk	Luhansk	1991	
Zaporizhzhia and Melitopol	Zaporizhzhia	1992	
Mykolaiv	Mykolaiv	1992	
Cherkasy and Kaniv	Cherkasy	1992	
Konotop and Hlukhiv	Konotop	1993	
Ovruch and Korosten	Ovruch	1993	
Bila Tserkva and Bohuslav	Bila Tserkva	1994	
Horlivka and Sloviansk	Horlivka	1994	
Tulchyn and Bratslav	Tulchyn	1994	
Khust and Vynohradiv	Khust	1994	
Volodymyr-Volynskyi and Kovel	Volodymyr-Volynskyi	1996	
Kryvyi Rih and Nikopol	Kryvyi Rih	1996	
Sarny and Poliske	Sarny	1999	
Berdyansk and Primorye	Berdyansk	2007	
Oleksandriia and Svitlovodsk	Oleksandriia	2007	
Kremenchuk and Lubny	Kremenchuk	2007	
Nizhyn and Pryluky	Nizhyn	2007	
Nova Kakhovka and Henichesk	Nova Kakhovka	2007	
Sievierodonetsk and Starobilsk	Sievierodonetsk	2007	
Shepetivka and Slavuta	Shepetivka	2007	
Dzhankoy and Rozdolne	Dzhankoy	2008–2022	
Uman and Zvenyhorodka	Uman	2008	
Kamianske and Tsarychanka	Kamianske	2010	
Balta and Ananyiv	Balta	2012	
Feodosia	Feodosia	2012–2022	
Izium and Kupiansk	Izium	2012	
Voznesensk	Voznesensk	2012	
Boryspil and Brovary	Boryspil	2013	
Mohyliv-Podilskyi	Mohyliv-Podilskyi	2013	
Rovenky	Rovenky	2013	
Romny	Romny	2013	

== Moldova ==
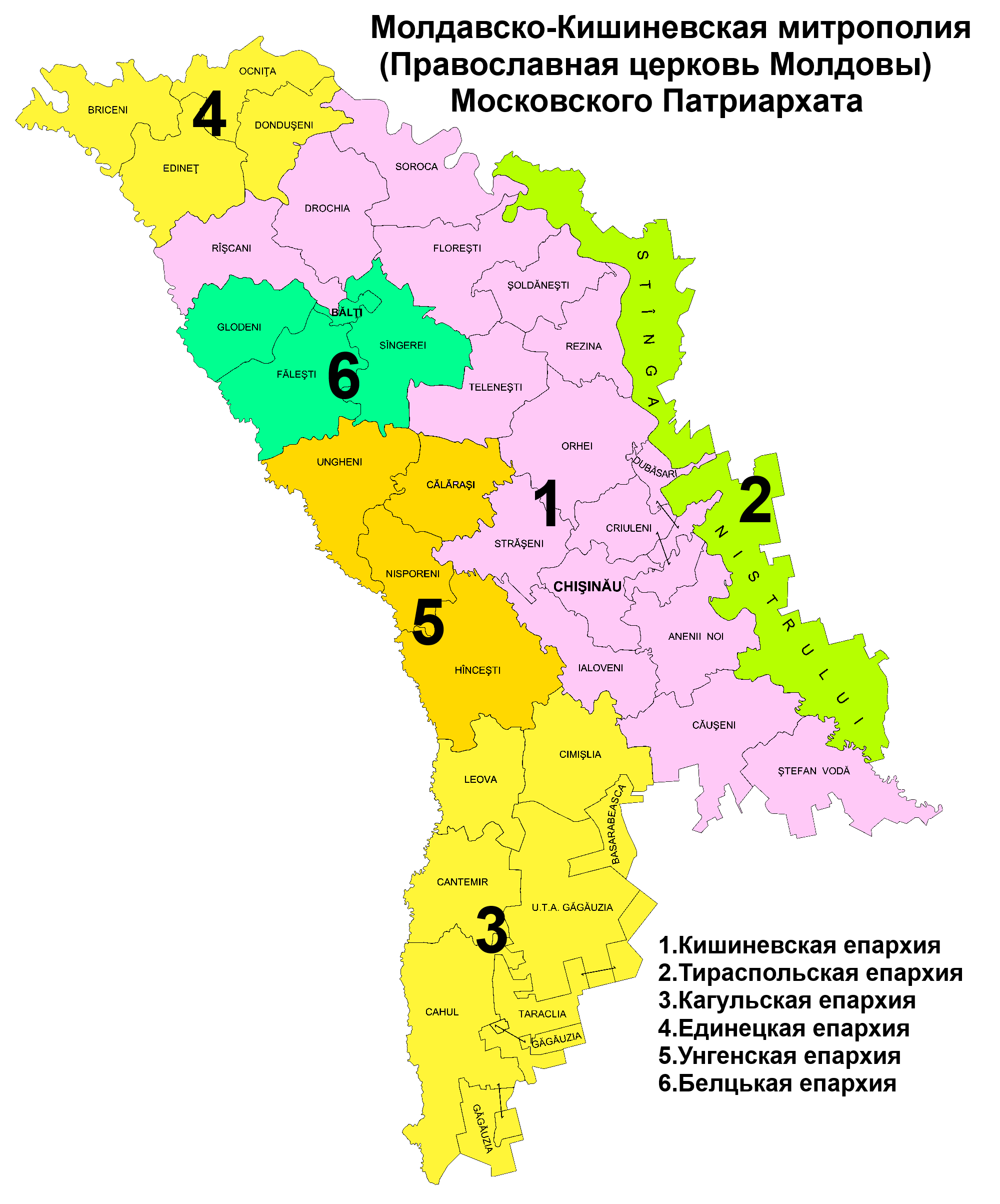
Eparchies of the Moldovan Orthodox Church

Eparchies of the Moldovan Orthodox Church:

Eparchy	See	Founded	Official site
Chișinău	Chișinău	1813	
Cahul and Comrat	Cahul	1998	
Ungheni and Nisporeni	Ungheni	2006	
Bălți and Făleşti	Bălți	2006	
Tiraspol and Dubăsari	Tiraspol	1998	
Edineț and Briceni	Edineț	1998	

== Former Soviet Republics ==
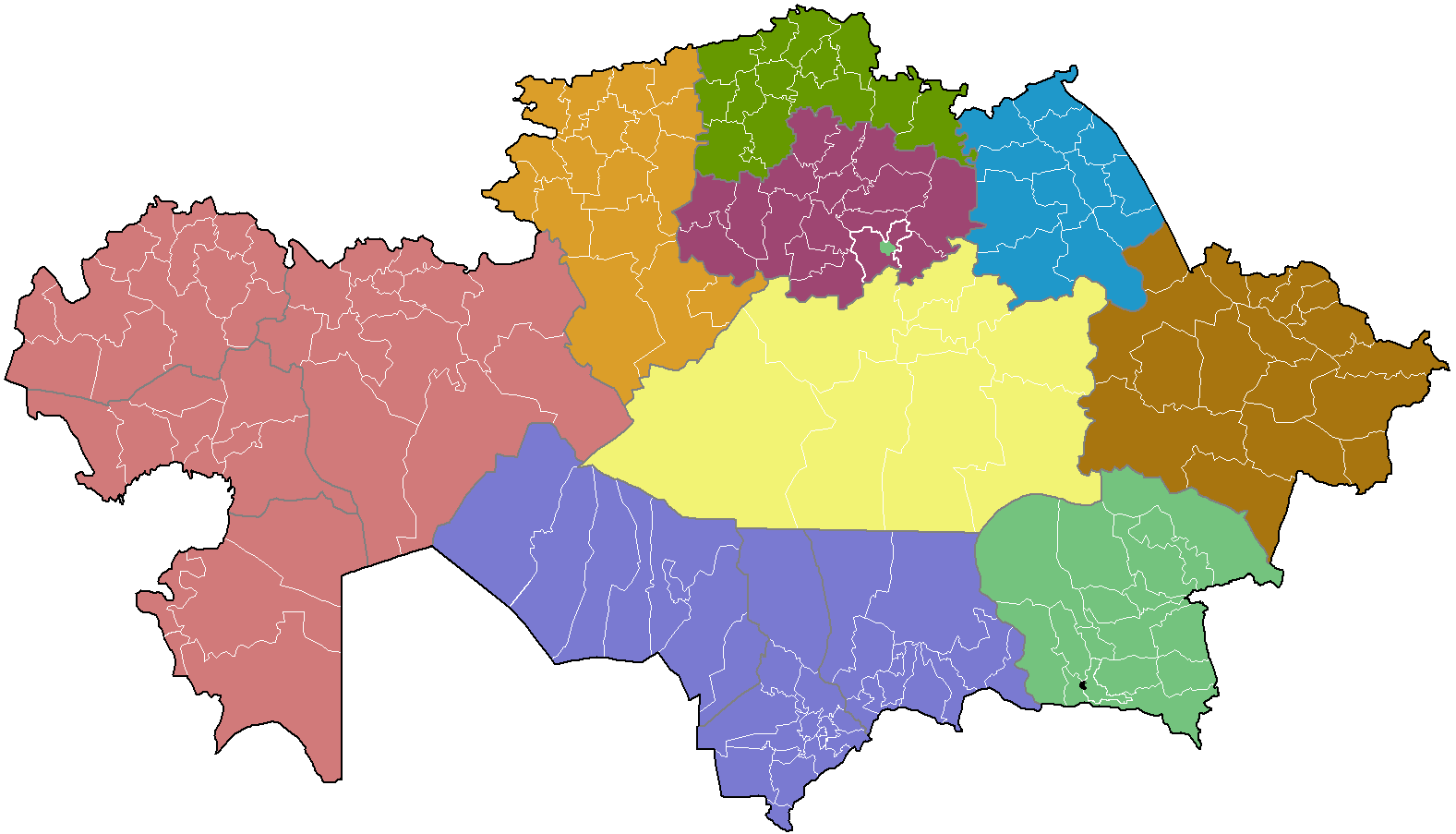
Eparchies of the Metropolitan District of the Russian Orthodox Church in Kazakhstan

Eparchies of the Russian Orthodox Church in Central Asia, Azerbaijan and Lithuania:

Eparchy	See	Founded	Official site	Metropolitan district	See	Founded
Astana and Alma-Ata	Astana	1945		Metropolitan District of the Russian Orthodox Church in Kazakhstan	Astana	2003
Karaganda	Karaganda	2010		Metropolitan District of the Russian Orthodox Church in Kazakhstan	Astana	2003
Kokshetau	Kokshetau	2011		Metropolitan District of the Russian Orthodox Church in Kazakhstan	Astana	2003
Kostanay	Kostanay	2010		Metropolitan District of the Russian Orthodox Church in Kazakhstan	Astana	2003
Pavlodar	Pavlodar	2010		Metropolitan District of the Russian Orthodox Church in Kazakhstan	Astana	2003
Petropavlovsk and Bulayevo	Petropavl	2011		Metropolitan District of the Russian Orthodox Church in Kazakhstan	Astana	2003
Uralsk and Guryev	Oral	1991		Metropolitan District of the Russian Orthodox Church in Kazakhstan	Astana	2003
Ust-Kamenogorsk	Oskemen	2011		Metropolitan District of the Russian Orthodox Church in Kazakhstan	Astana	2003
Shymkent and Taraz	Shymkent	1991		Metropolitan District of the Russian Orthodox Church in Kazakhstan	Astana	2003
Bishkek	Bishkek	2011		Central Asian metropolitan district of the Russian Orthodox Church	Tashkent	2011
Dushanbe	Dushanbe	2011		Central Asian metropolitan district of the Russian Orthodox Church	Tashkent	2011
Tashkent and Uzbekistan	Tashkent	1871		Central Asian metropolitan district of the Russian Orthodox Church	Tashkent	2011
Baku and Azerbaijan	Baku	1919				
Vilnius and Lithuania	Vilnius	1839				

== Japan ==
Eparchies of the Japanese Orthodox Church:

Eparchy	See	Founded	Official site
Kyoto and Western Japan	Kyoto	1970	
Sendai and Eastern Japan	Sendai	1970	
Tokyo	Tokyo	1906	

== Eparchies in the diaspora ==
Eparchies of the Russian Orthodox Church in the diaspora:

Eparchy	See	Founded	Official site	Patriarchal Exarchate	See	Founded
Argentina and South America	Buenos Aires	1946				
Berlin and Germany	Berlin	1921				
Budapest and Hungary	Budapest	2000				
Vienna and Austria	Vienna	1962				
Archdiocese of Russian Orthodox churches in Western Europe	Paris	1921				
Brussels and Belgium	Brussels	1936		Patriarchal Exarchate in Western Europe	Paris	2018
The Hague and the Netherlands	The Hague	1972		Patriarchal Exarchate in Western Europe	Paris	2018
Khersones	Paris	1960		Patriarchal Exarchate in Western Europe	Paris	2018
Sourozh	London	1962		Patriarchal Exarchate in Western Europe	Paris	2018
Spain and Portugal	Madrid	2018		Patriarchal Exarchate in Western Europe	Paris	2018
Singapore	Singapore	1936		Patriarchal Exarchate in South-East Asia	Singapore	2018
Korea	Seoul	2019		Patriarchal Exarchate in South-East Asia	Singapore	2018
Diocese of Thailand	Bangkok	2019		Patriarchal Exarchate in South-East Asia	Singapore	2018
Philippines and Vietnam	Manila	2019		Patriarchal Exarchate in South-East Asia	Singapore	2018

== Russian Orthodox Church Outside Russia ==
Eparchies of the Russian Orthodox Church Outside Russia:

Eparchy	See	Founded	Official site
Berlin and Germany	Berlin	1926	
Caracas and South America	Buenos Aires	1957	
Diocese of Great Britain and Western Europe	London	1954	
Eastern America and New York	New York City	1964	
Montreal and Canada	Montreal	1936	
San Francisco and Western America	San Francisco	1927	
Sydney, Australia and New Zealand	Sydney	1946	
Chicago and Mid-America	Chicago	1954	

== See also ==
- Edinoverie
- Eparchies and metropolitanates of the Serbian Orthodox Church
- Eparchies and metropolitanates of the Romanian Orthodox Church
- Eparchies of the Georgian Orthodox Church
