= Russian Orthodox Church in Malaysia =

Orthodox Christians in Malaysia

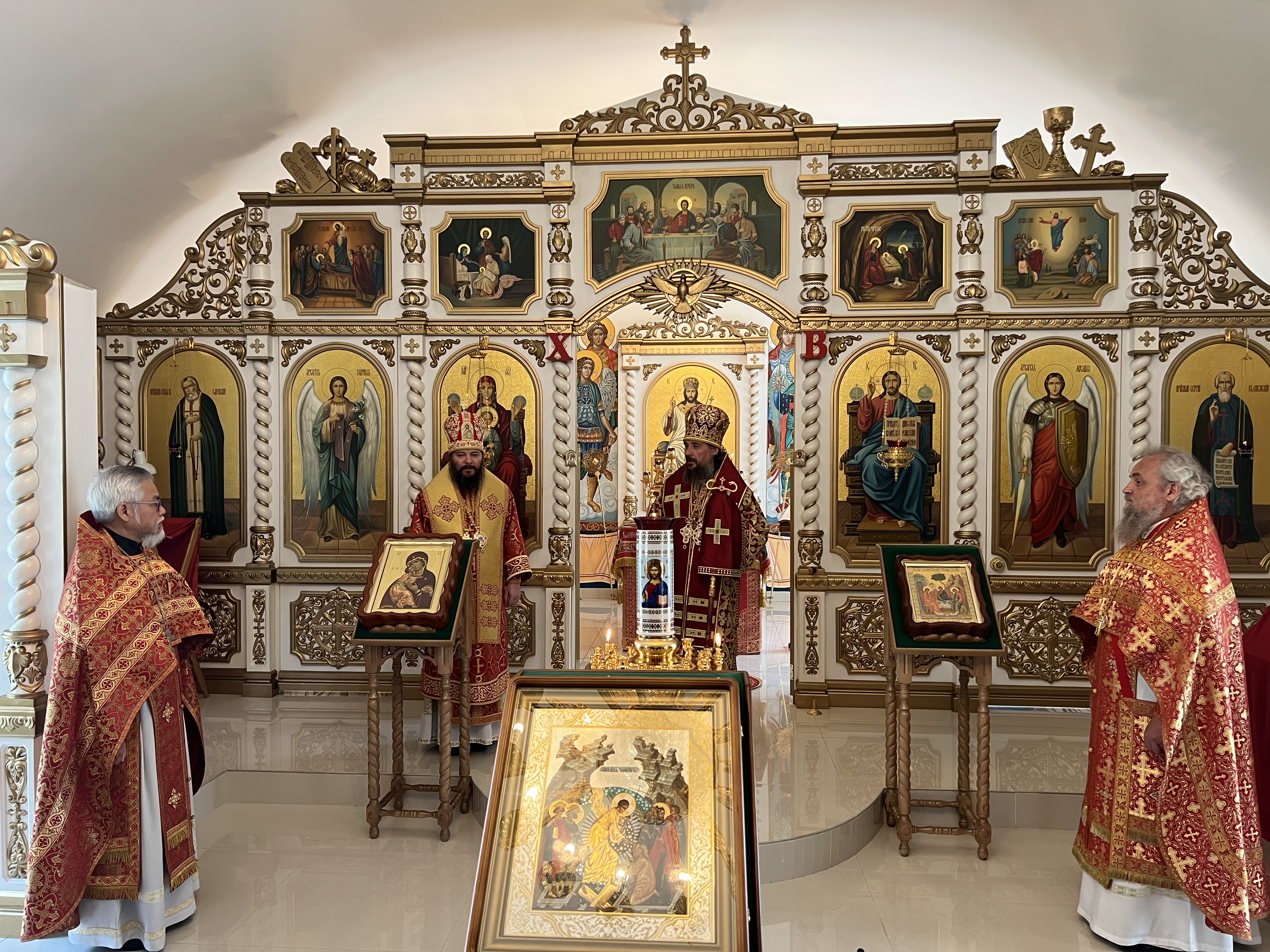
- Church of Saint Michael in Kuala Lumpur
- Primate: Metropolitan Sergius (Chashin)
- Parishes: 1
- Chapels: At least 4
- Recognition: Part of the Diocese of Singapore

The Russian Orthodox Church in Malaysia (Russian: Русская Православная Церковь в Малайзии) (Malay: Gereja Ortodoks Rusia di Malaysia) is represented by a single parish church, named after Saint Michael the Archangel and is located in the Federal Territory of Kuala Lumpur. However, there are reportedly smaller chapels in the Malayan peninsula operated by the Russian Orthodox Church.

== Organization ==
As part of the wider Russian Orthodox Church, the supreme authority falls upon Holy Synod of the Russian Orthodox Church, with Patriarch Kirill of Moscow serving as Primate of the Patriarchate of Moscow and chairman of the Holy Synod. The Malaysian churches of the Russian Orthodox Church fall under the Diocese of Singapore, headed by Metropolitan Sergius (Chashin), who is also Primate of the whole Patriarchal Exarchate in South-East Asia. The diocese has an auxiliary bishop, bishop Pitirim of Jakarta.
