= Diocese of Anadyr =

Diocese of Russian Orthodox Church, Moscow, Russia

Diocese of Anadyr Анадырская епархия
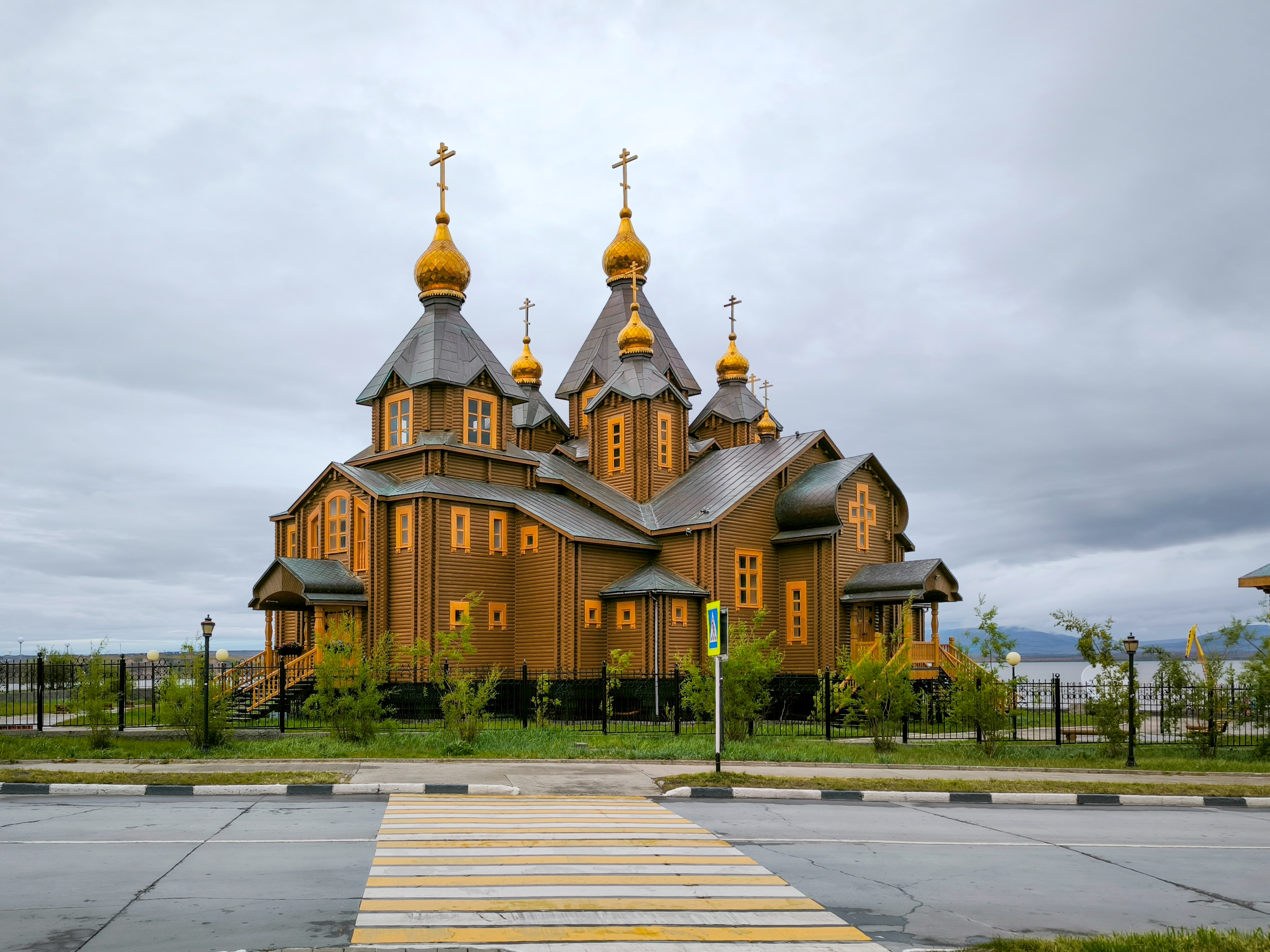
- Holy Trinity Cathedral in Anadyr

Location
- Country: Russia
- Territory: Chukotka Autonomous Okrug
- Subdivisions: 6 deaneries

Statistics
- Area: 737.700 km^{2} (284.828 sq mi)
- Parishes: 10

Information
- Established: 19 July 2000
- Cathedral: Holy Trinity Cathedral

Current leadership
- Archbishop: Hypatius (Golubev)

Website
- pravchukotka.ru/

The Diocese of Anadyr (Анадырская епархия) is a diocese of the Russian Orthodox Church, the centralized religious organization headed by Moscow Patriarchate. The diocese operates churches within the borders of the Chukotka Autonomous Okrug.

The cathedral church and the official seat of a diocesan bishop are located in the town of Anadyr.

== History ==
The Anadyr diocese of the Russian Orthodox Church was founded by the resolution of the Holy Synod of the Russian Orthodox Church on 19 July 2000, by separating parishes in the territory of the Chukotka Autonomous Okrug from the Eparchy of Magadan.

== Bishops ==
- Diomid (Dzyuban) (9 August 2000 - 28 June 2008)
- Mark (Tuzhikov) (28 June 2008 - 31 March 2009) acting, archbishop of Khabarovsk
- Nicodemus (Chibisov) (31 March 2009 - 30 May 2011)
- Seraphim (Glushakov) (30 May 2011 - 24 December 2015, acting from 24 December 2015 - 3 January 2016)
- Matthew (Kopylov) (3 January 2016 - 14 July 2018, acting from 14 July - 21 August 2018)
- Hypatius (Golubev) (since 21 August 2018)

== See also ==
- Russian Orthodox Church
- Eparchies and Metropolitanates of the Russian Orthodox Church
