= Diocese of Singapore =

Diocese of Singapore may refer to one of the following:

- Anglican Diocese of Singapore
- Anglican Diocese of Singapore (1909)
- Archdiocese of Singapore (Latin Catholic)
- Eastern Orthodox Metropolitanate of Singapore and South Asia
- Diocese of Singapore (Russian Orthodox Church)
