= Diocese of the Philippines and Vietnam =

Diocese of the Russian Orthodox Church

Location
- Territory: Philippines; Vietnam
- Ecclesiastical province: Patriarchal Exarchate in South-East Asia
- Metropolitan: Sergius (Chashin)

Information
- Denomination: Eastern Orthodox Church
- Established: 2014 (as its precursor, a diocese of the Philippines, the Philippine Orthodox Church (Moscow Patriarchate)), 2019 (as the Philippine-Vietnamese diocese of the PESEA)
- Language: Cebuano, English, Church Slavonic, Tagalog

Current leadership
- Parent church: Russian Orthodox Church
- Bishop of Manila and Hanoi: Paul (Fokin)

Website
- https://phvieparchy.org/en/

The Diocese of the Philippines and Vietnam (also known as the Philippine–Vietnamese Diocese or the Filipino-Vietnamese Diocese, Russian: Филиппинско-Вьетнамская епархия, romanized: Filippinsko-Vyetnamskaya yeparhiya) is a diocese of the Patriarchate of Moscow created on 26 February 2019, directly under the Patriarchal Exarchate in Southeast Asia (PESEA).

== History ==
=== Philippine Orthodox Church ===
==== Overview ====
In March 2014, the five diocesan provinces of Sarangani, South Cotabato, Sultan Kudarat, Cotabato and Maguindanao of the Philippine Independent Church (also known as Aglipayans), led by their two bishops Esteban Valmera and Rogelio Ringor together with thirteen other Aglipayan clergy petitioned Patriarch Kirill of Moscow and All Rus’ to accept their dioceses, totaling 28 parishes, into the Orthodox Church. Inspired by their moves and motives, another Aglipayan group called the Aglipayan Christian Church under the leadership of their eight bishops and superiors, also petitioned to the Patriarch of Moscow that they also wished to bring their entire group to embrace the Orthodox faith.

The Moscow Patriarchate then responded by sending Russian Orthodox missionaries in order to catechize the groups wishing to convert. Among the missionaries who came to the Philippines were Fr. Kirill Shkarbul from Taiwan, Fr. Stanislav Rasputin and Fr. George Maksimov from Russia, as well as lay missionaries Aleksei, Timothy and Sergei, from Russia, the United States and Ukraine, respectively.

==== Organization ====
The eparchy is one of the two canonical jurisdictions in the Philippines under the Patriarchate of Moscow, the other being the Philippine Mission of the Russian Orthodox Church outside Russia under the semiautonomous Russian Orthodox Church outside Russia.

On February 26, 2019, the Holy Synod formed the Diocese of Korea, the Diocese of Singapore, the Diocese of Thailand, and the Diocese of the Philippines and Vietnam within the Patriarchal Exarchate in South-East Asia and appointed Metropolitan Sergius as the ruling Bishop of the Singapore diocese and locum tenens of the other three dioceses.

==== Relations with the Philippine government ====
On 18 September 2014, the Moscow Patriarchate was registered with the government of the Philippines as the Philippine Orthodox Church (Moscow Patriarchate). On 26 September 2014, the Philippine Orthodox Church Deanery of St. John the Baptist based in Ladol, Alabel, Sarangani was registered and on 29 September 2014, the Philippine Orthodox Church Deanery of the Mother of God and Ever Virgin Mary based in Aglipayan Village, Sto. Niño, Tugbok, Dávao was also registered.

In a meeting with Archbishop Sergius Chashin of Solnechnogorsk on 19 June 2017, Foreign-Affairs Secretary Alan Peter Cayetano pledged to help revive, through state power, services at the Ivī́rōn Church on Taft Avenue in Manila.

=== Diocese of the Philippines and Vietnam of the PESEA ===
On 28 December 2018, in response to the Ecumenical Patriarchate's actions in Ukraine, the Holy Synod of the Russian Orthodox Church decided to create "a Patriarchal Exarchate in South-East Asia [PESEA] with the center in Singapore." The "sphere of pastoral responsibility" of the PESEA is Singapore, Vietnam, Indonesia, Cambodia, North Korea, South Korea, Laos, Malaysia, the Myanmar, the Philippines, and Thailand. Archbishop Sergius (Chashin), was appointed as primate of the newly created PESEA, with the title "of Singapore and South-East Asia" On the same day, in an interview with Russia-24 channel, Metropolitan Hilarion, spokesman of the ROC, declared the ROC "will now act as if they [Constantinople] do not exist at all because our purpose is missionary, our task is to educate, we are creating these structures for ministerial care about our flock, there can be no such deterring factors here", and that the ROC will take charge of the Orthodox faithfuls of its diaspora instead of the Eumenical Patriarchate. The Moscow Patriarchate aims to establish parallel jurisdictions all over the world without consultations with the Ecumenical Patriarchate, effectively competing with the latter.

On 7 January 2019, during the evening service in the Church of Christ the Savior in Moscow, Patriarch Kirill elevated Archbishop Sergius (Chashin) to the rank of Metropolitan in connection with the latter's appointment as exarch of the PESEA.

On 26 February 2019, the PESEA was divided into four dioceses that were created, of which the Diocese of the Philippines and Vietnam.

30 August 2019, Paul (Fokin) was appointed as bishop Bishop of Manila and Hanoi.

20 September 2019, ROCOR mission in the Philippines was received to Diocese of the Philippines and Vietnam

On February 22, 2020, Metropolitan Paul of Manila and Hanoi celebrated the great consecration of the Church of St. Seraphim of Sarov in Makalangot on the island of Mindanao, which became the first full-fledged church building in the diocese. On the same day, a first Diocesan Assembly of the clergy and laity of the Philippine-Vietnamese diocese was held was held there. Five deaneries within the diocese were established: deanery of Manila, deanery of Davao City, deanery of General Santos, deanery of Vietnam, and deanery of Davao del Sur.

On February 12, 2023, meeting of the clergy of the diocese decided to separate the North Kotobato deanery from the Davaovo deanery, and also to include the Davao del Sur deanery to the Davao deanery. A diocesan Department for Prison Service and a Youth Department were also established.

== Ruling bishops of the diocese ==
The bishop of the diocese bears the title of Bishop of Manila and Hanoi.

- Sergius (Chashin) (26 February 2019 – 30 August 2019) locum tenens
- Paul (Fokin) (30 August 2019-)
