= Philippine Mission of the Russian Orthodox Church outside Russia =

The ROCOR (Russian Orthodox Church Outside of Russia) Canonical and Official Representation in the Philippines is a jurisdiction of the Eastern Orthodox Church under the Russian Orthodox Church Outside Russia (also called the Russian Orthodox Church Abroad, ROCA, ROCOR, the Karlovsty Synod, or the Synod), a semi-autonomous jurisdiction of the Moscow Patriarchate under Metropolitan Nicholas (Olhovsky), First Hierarch of the ROCOR. As of August 2013, there are four missions in the country.

It is one of the two canonical jurisdictions in the Philippines under the Patriarchate of Moscow, the other being the Eparchy of the Philippines and Vietnam, administered by the Patriarchal Exarchate of Southeast Asia.

== History ==
During the American colonial regime, some Russian émigrées fleeing the Russian Civil War arrived in the Philippines. In 1935, the Russian Orthodox Church established the first Orthodox parish in Manila, and the Patriarch of Moscow and All Russia appointed Father Mikhail Yerokhin as vicar. The Episcopal Church then permitted Fr. Mikhail to use the north transept of their Cathedral of Saint Mary and Saint John for worship. In 1937, the Russian Orthodox Church built the first Orthodox church in the Philippines, dedicated and named after the Iberian Icon of the Mother of God, or Ivī́rṓn. Both the Episcopal Cathedral and the Russian Orthodox church in Manila were destroyed in 1945 by Allied bombardment during the city's liberation at the end of the Second World War.

In 1949, Archbishop John Maximovitch and 5,500 Russian Orthodox from China were relocated to Tubabao (now part of Guiuan, Eastern Samar) in the Visayas, by the International Refugee Organization, with the permission of the newly-sovereign Republic of the Philippines. Archbishop Maximovitch then established a wooden church, orphanage, and other buildings in Tubabao exclusively for the Russian refugees.

Tubabao, however, was and still a small, underdeveloped island which is humid, prone to typhoons, and at times inaccessible due to the sea state conditions. When a Russian commented that they feared a typhoon would destroy their camp, Filipinos replied that there was nothing to worry about because "your holy man blesses your camp from four directions every night." Anecdotally, there were no typhoons or floods while Archbishop Maximovitch was there.

Archbishop Maximovitch did not preach the Orthodox faith to locals, and no Filipino was baptized, chrismated, ordained or consecrated during his stay. Through the persistent lobbying of Archbishop Maximovitch to the United States Congress, the refugees were allowed to settle in the United States and Australia beginning in 1951.

=== Rededication ===
In August 2013, Metropolitan Hilarion, First Hierarch of the Russian Church Abroad, sent Archpriest Seraphim Bell and Fr. Dcn. Silouan (Thompson) to help re-establish the Russian Orthodox Church Outside of Russia (Canonical and Official Representation in the Philippines) and made the first Divine Liturgy, baptism of catechumens, trained chanters and the blessing of the first ROCOR mission in the Municipality of Sta. Maria, Davao del Sur. The chapel was dedicated to St. John Maximovitch in honor of the first Russian Orthodox saint who lived in the country sometimes in the 1950s. Before departing Davao, Fathers Seraphim, Philip (Felipe Balingit) and Silouan visited the ROCOR Mission Center in Davao City, the second ROCOR mission in the Philippines. The Mission Center is dedicated to the "Holy Royal Martyrs". Fr. Seraphim then went to Tubabao Island where the Russian Refugees took and camp. Before departing for Tubabao, Fr. Seraphim served Divine Liturgy in Palo, Leyte at the ROCOR mission dedicated to St. Nikolai Velimirovich, the third ROCOR mission in the Philippines. They performed baptism in Palo to 10 catechumens, and finally they went to Tubabao Island. On the day of the Feast of the Vladimir icon of the Theotokos, a Divine Liturgy was served in the chapel of the Theotokos on Tubabao Island. The new chapel is located on the site of the previous chapel of the Mother of God, built by the Russian refugees who lived on the island from 1949–51; the same chapel in which St. John Maximovitch concelebrated during his stay there. This was the first Liturgy to be served on the island in 62 years.

A small group of Orthodox pilgrims made their way from the city of Leyte to the town of Guian. Included in the group were the 10 newly baptized Christians from the ROCOR parish of St. Nikolai Velimirovich in Palo together with Fr. Sava Salinas, a priest of the Antiochian Archdiocese in Leyte, Fr. Philip Balingit, administrator of the ROCOR parishes in the Philippines, Fr. Dn. Silouan Thompson, a young journalist and TV presenter, the head of the local tourist association, and Fr. Seraphim who was blessed to be the celebrant of the liturgy.

They arrived in Guian on Saturday evening. Early Sunday morning at 05:45, they made their way to the docks and took a small boat across the water to the island of Tubabao. From the landing on Tubabao, it is a short walk of about 1.6 kilometers. They walked down the same road that was used by the Russian refugees during their stay, passing the bamboo huts of the islanders on their way. Finally they turned off the road and walked into the bush until they came to the new chapel (the fourth ROCOR mission in the Philippines). The Divine Liturgy was served.

=== 2020s ===
In 2026, the Dean of Mission is Hieromonk Felipe.

== Missions ==
- St. John Maximovitch Orthodox Mission, Davao del Sur
- St. Nikolai Orthodox Community, Manila
- Church of St. Nikolai of Zicha, Leyte
- Mission of the Iveron Icon of the Mother of God, Samar
