= Anatolie Botnari =

Moldovan bishop

Bishop Anatolie (Botnari)
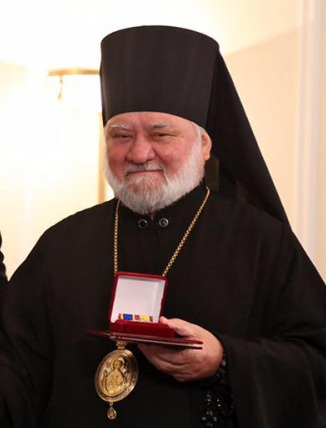
- Born: August 18, 1952 (age 73); Pituşca, Moldovan SSR
- Education: Moscow Theological Academy
- Church: Moldovan Orthodox Church
- Ordained: 1974 (deacon/priest), 1998 (monk/bishop)
- Title: Bishop of Cahul and Comrat

Anatolie (Botnari), born Gheorghe Tomici Botnari on May 3, 1950, is a bishop of the Moldovan Orthodox Church under the Moscow Patriarchate. He serves as Bishop of Cahul and Comrat, a diocese of the Russian Orthodox Church in Moldova.

== Life ==
Gheorghe Botnari was born into a cantor's family in Pituşca, Moldova, in 1952. In 1971 he entered the Odessa Theological Seminary, graduating in 1974. He was ordained a deacon and priest in March 1974 and served as a parish priest in Moldova from 1974 until 1998, being elevated to the rank of archpriest in 1990.

On August 28, 1998, Fr. Gheorghe was tonsured a monk with the name of Anatolie and two days later elevated to the rank of archimandrite. On September 12, 1998, Archimandrite Anatolie was consecrated to the episcopacy at Moscow's Danilov Monastery and enthroned as Bishop of Cahul and Comrat in southern Moldova. He continues to serve as the diocesan bishop of the Cahul and Comrat Eparchy.
