= Diocese of Arkhangelsk =

Diocese of the Russian Orthodox Church

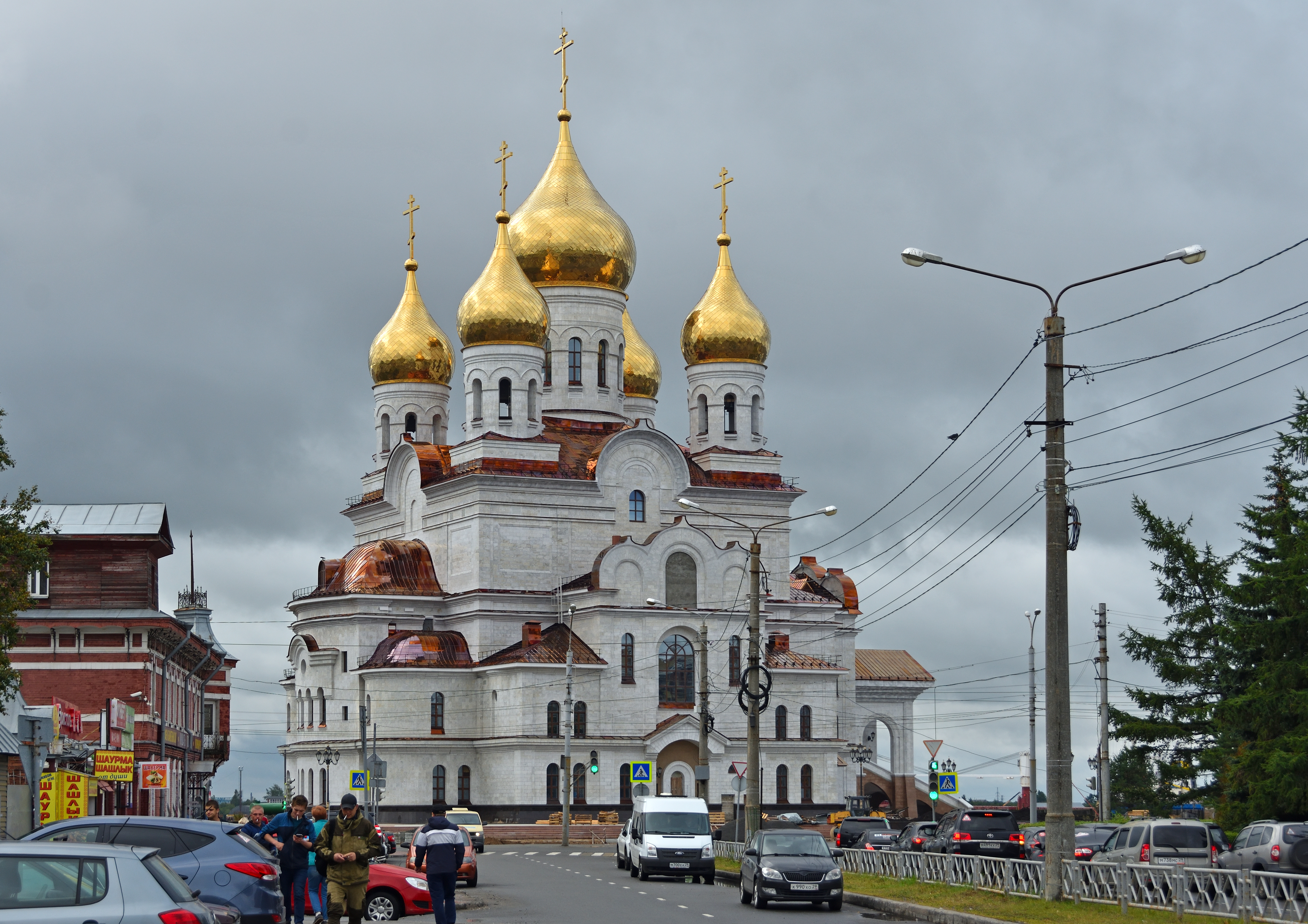
- St. Michael Archangel Cathedral

Location
- Deaneries: 7
- Headquarters: Arkhangelsk

Statistics
- Parishes: 104

Information
- Denomination: Eastern Orthodox
- Sui iuris church: Russian Orthodox Church
- Established: 18 March 1682
- Cathedral: Saint Michael Archangel Cathedral
- Language: Old Church Slavonic

Current leadership
- Governance: Eparchy
- Bishop: Kornilii Sinyaev since 30 August 2019

Website
- www.yareparhia.ru

Diocese of Arkhangelsk and Kholmogory (Russian: Архангельская и Холмогорская епархия) is an eparchy of the Russian Orthodox Church.

== History ==
Kholmogory and Vazhsky Diocese Council established by decree in 1682, was composed of the north-eastern part of the territory of the Novgorod metropolis, the city of Arkhangelsk and Holmogory with counties, Kevrol, Mezen, Kola, Pustozersk, Vaga, a quarter Vazhsky to award a Ustyanovskimi parishes, the Solovetsky monastery.

Originally the see was in Kholmogory (1682–1762 gg.), The first head of the diocese was St. Athanasius (Lyubimov) (March 1682 – September 1702).

In 1732 the diocese was renamed Arkhangelsk and Kholmogory.

In 1762 the bishop's diocesan administration and authorities were transferred to Arkhangelsk (a voivodship from 1702 and provincial capital from 1708).

By state in 1764 the diocese was ranked 8th among the 15 class III dioceses.

On October 6, 1995, by the decision of the Holy Synod of the Russian Orthodox Church, the Syktyvkar diocese was established. On December 27 the Diocese of Murmansk was established, later called Arkhangelsk and Kholmogory.

On December 27, 2011, the Kotlas and Naryan-Mar diocese was established, and the Arkhangelsk diocese became part of the newly formed Metropolis of Arkhangelsk.

== Bishops ==
- Athanasius (Lyubimov) (March 18, 1682 – September 6, 1702)
- Parthenius (Neboza) (December 3, 1703 – January 2, 1704) died before he could be ordained as bishop
- Sylvester (Kraysky) (March 11, 1705 – September 1707)
- Raphael (Krasnopolsky) (March 21, 1708 – November 5, 1711)
- Barnabas (Volatkovsky) (August 24, 1712 – October 8, 1730)
- Herman (Koptsevich) (May 2, 1731 – July 25, 1735)
- Aaron (December 28, 1735 – May 7, 1738)
- Sabbas (Shpakovsky) (February 18, 1739 – June 30, 1740)
- Barsanuphius (Schenykov) (July 13, 1740 – November 8, 1759)
- Joasaph (Lisyansky) (December 2, 1761 – May 1, 1769)
- Anthony (Gerasimov-Zabelin) (October 10, 1770 – July 9 1773)
- Arsenius (Vereshchagin) (December 22, 1773 – April 1, 1775)
- Benjamin (Krasnopevkov-Rumovsky) (April 1, 1775 – October 26, 1798)
- Apollos (Baibakov) (October 26, 1798 – May 14, 1801)
- Eulampius (Vvedensky) (June 29, 1801 – April 16, 1809)
- Parthenius (Petrov) (June 6, 1809 – July 22, 1819)
- Joseph (Velichkovsky) (November 9, 1819 – July 3, 1821)
- Neophyte (Dokuchayev-Platonov) (August 15, 1821 – June 8, 1825)
- Aaron (Nartsissov) (February 14, 1826 – August 16, 1830)
- George (Yashchurzhinsky) (August 16, 1830 – June 30, 1845)
- Barlaam (Uspensky) (June 30, 1845 – December 4, 1854)
- Anthony (Pavlinsky) (December 18, 1854 – July 20, 1857)
- Alexander (Pavlovich) (November 17, 1857 – September 13, 1860)
- Nathanael (Savchenko) (September 13, 1860 – August 16, 1871)
- Juvenal (Karyukov) (August 17, 1871 – December 25, 1876)
- Macarius (Mirolyubov) (December 25, 1876 – May 23, 1879)
- Nathanael (Soborov) (May 23, 1879 – March 6, 1882)
- Serapion (Mayevsky) (March 6, 1882 – February 16, 1885)
- Nathanael (Soborov) (February 16, 1885 – June 3, 1890)
- Alexander (Zaķis) (June 3, 1890 – April 16, 1893)
- Sergius (Sokolov) (September 30, 1892 – January 1893) locum tenens
- Nicanorus (Kamensky) (April 16, 1893 – February 10, 1896)
- Joannicius (Nadezhdin) (February 10, 1896 – February 7, 1901)
- Joannicius (Kazansky) (February 7, 1901 – October 31, 1908)
- Mikhei (Alekseyev) (October 31, 1908 – April 17, 1912)
- Nathanael (Troitsky) (April 17, 1912 – 1921)
- Anthony (Bystrov) (March 1921 – August 11, 1931)
- Sophrony (Arefyev) (1924 – December 27, 1927)
- Apollos (Rzhanitsyn) (August 11, 1931 – January 1933)
- Nicephorus (Nikolsky) (January – October 19, 1933)
- Nikon (Purlevsky) (November 1, 1933 – June 5, 1937)
- John (Sokolov) (June 5, 1937 – November 1941)
- Michael (Postnikov) (February 12 – May 6, 1944) refused the appointment
- Leontius (Smirnov) (May 6, 1944 – January 22, 1953)
- Gabriel (Ogorodnikov) (January 28 – July 24, 1953) locum tenens
- Theodosius (Koverninsky) (November 16, 1953 – February 17, 1956)
- Nicander (Viktorov) (March 8, 1956 – March 16, 1961)
- Innocent (Zelnitsky) (March 16, 1961 – November 16, 1962)
- Polikarp (Priymak) (November 16, 1962 – January 27, 1966)
- Nikon (Fomichev) (January 27, 1966 – June 11, 1977)
- Isidore (Kirichenko) (June 19, 1977 – May 12, 1987)
- Panteleimon (Dolganov) (May 17, 1987 – December 27, 1995)
- Tikhon (Stepanov) (February 4, 1996 – October 20, 2010)
- Manuel (Pavlov) (October 20 – December 24, 2010) locum tenens
- Daniel (Dorovskikh) (December 24, 2010 – September 30, 2019)
- Cornelius (Sinyaev) (from September 30, 2019)

== See also ==
- Russian Orthodox Church
- Eparchies and Metropolitanates of the Russian Orthodox Church
