= Nicodim Vulpe =

Moldovan Orthodox bishop

Bishop Nicodemus
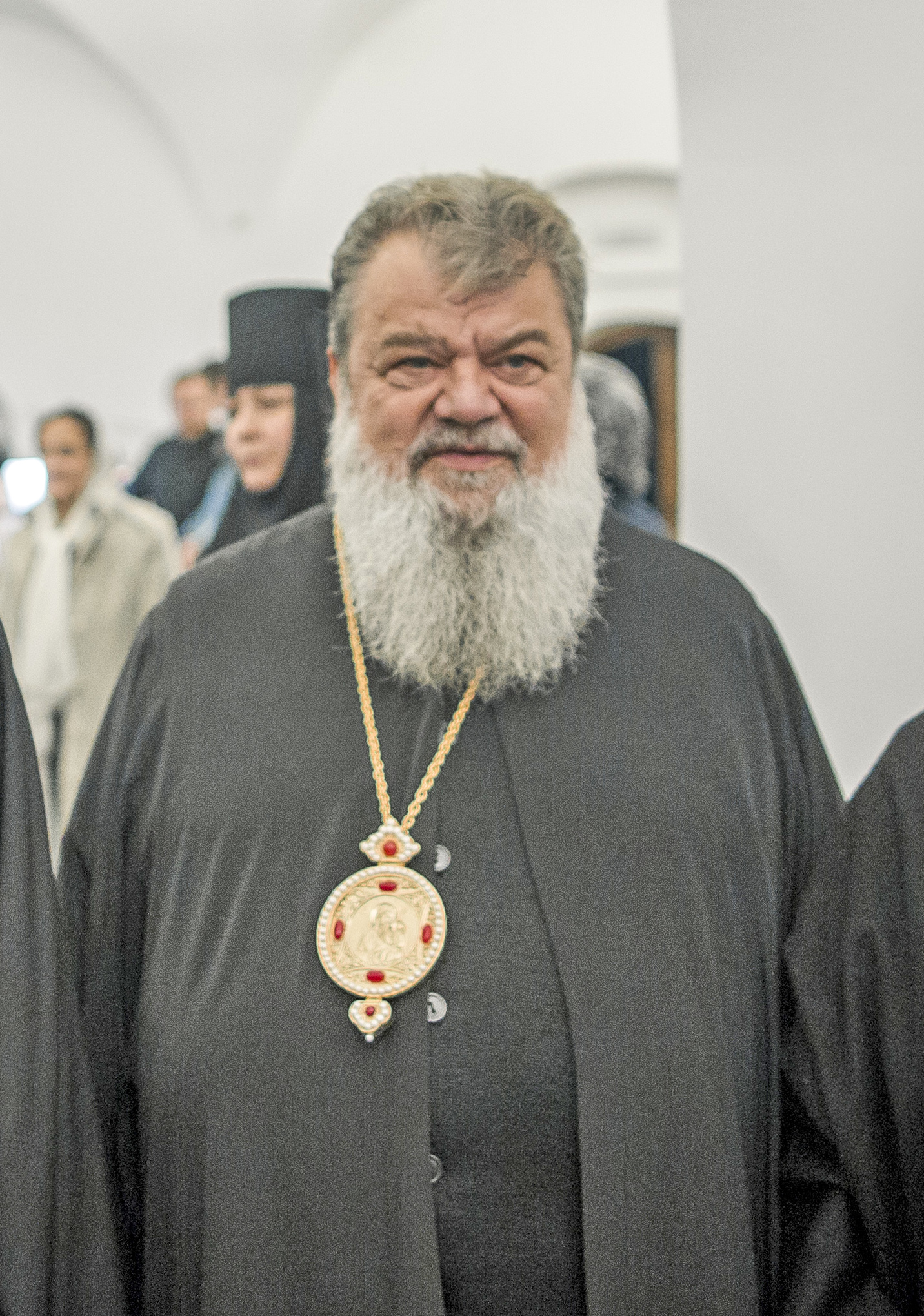
- Nicodemus in 2017
- Born: September 4, 1956 (age 69); Chiperceni, Moldovan SSR
- Education: Moscow Theological Academy
- Church: Moldovan Orthodox Church
- Ordained: 1981 (deacon/priest), 2009 (monk), 2010 (bishop)
- Title: Bishop of Edineț and Briceni

Bishop Nicodemus or Nicodim (born Ioan Vulpe, Russian: Иоанн Васильевич Вулпе; born 4 September 1956), is a bishop of the Moldovan Orthodox Church under the Moscow Patriarchate. He serves as Bishop of Edineț and Briceni, a diocese of the Russian Orthodox Church in Moldova.

== Life ==
Born to a peasant family in 1956, Ioan graduated from secondary school in 1973, going on to serve in the Soviet Army from 1974 to 1976. After being discharged from the armed forces Ioan entered the St. Petersburg Theological Seminary in 1977 and then the St. Petersburg Theological Academy. on March 18, 1981, Ioan was ordained a deacon at Holy Transfiguration Cathedral in St. Petersburg by Archbishop Meliton (Soloviev) of Tikhvin. Two months later Archbishop Cyril (Gundyayev) of Vyborg ordained Fr. Dn. Ioan to the priesthood. He went on to serve various parishes in Moldova.

On January 23, 2009, Fr. Ioan was tonsured a monk with the name of Nicodim and elevated to the rank of igumen a month later. In April he was elevated to the rank of archimandrite. On December 24, 2010, the Holy Synod of the Russian Orthodox Church elected Archimandrite Nicodim as Bishop of Edineț and Briceni. He was consecrated to the episcopacy on December 26, 2010, by Patriarch Cyril (Gundyayev) at Moscow's Cathedral of Christ the Saviour.

Bishop Nicodim continues to serve as diocesan bishop of the Edineț and Briceni Eparchy.
