= Seraphim Glushakov =

Bishop of Anadyr' and Chukotka, Russian Orthodox church (1969–2020)

Seraphim, born Fyodor Mikhailovich Glushakov (19 March 1969 – 9 June 2020) was a Bishop of the Russian Orthodox Church, who headed the Diocese of Anadyr and Chukotka from 2011 to 2015.

== Biography ==
He was born in 1969 in Karaganda into an Orthodox family, exiled to Kazakhstan during the repressions of the 1930s. In 1986 he graduated from a secondary school and entered the Moscow Theological Seminary. After graduation, he entered the Holy Dormition Pskov-Pechersky Monastery as a novice. In 1992 he graduated from the Kuibyshev State Pedagogical Institute. On 16 February 1992, he was ordained a deacon by Archbishop Proclus of Ulyanovsk and Melekess. On 5 July 1992, he was ordained a presbyter by Archbishop Eusebius of Samara and Syzran and appointed rector of the Resurrection Cathedral under construction in the city of Samara, which was consecrated in 1993. In the 1990s, the Resurrection Cathedral became the first Orthodox church on the working-class outskirts of Samara - Bezymyanka. Under the leadership of Glushakov, the building of the Resurrection Cathedral itself was reconstructed and significantly expanded, the adjacent territory being improved.

On 23 June 1998, with the blessing of Archbishop Sergius of Samara and Syzran, he took monastic vows. By Easter 2000 he was elevated to the rank of hegumen. In 2002, he graduated from the Moscow Theological Academy with a PhD in Theology; he supervised two diocesan commissions of the Samara diocese (for external relations and for monasteries). On 6 October 2003, by the decision of the Holy Synod, the Resurrection Cathedral was transformed into the Resurrection Monastery, and Abbot Seraphim was appointed the abbot of this monastery.

In 2004, he graduated with honors from the Law Faculty of the Stolypin Volga Academy of Public Administration. He taught at the Samara Theological Seminary and the Samara State Economic University. By Easter 2010, he was elevated to the rank of archimandrite.

On 22 March 2011, by decision of the Holy Synod, he was elected Bishop of the Resurrection, vicar of the Moscow diocese. On 21 May, the day of the Council of New Martyrs, Patriarch Kirill led the rite of naming Archimandrite Seraphim (Glushakov) as Bishop of the Resurrection in the Church of the New Martyrs and Confessors of Russia. On 22 May, at the Transfiguration Cathedral of the Nikolo-Ugreshsky Monastery, he was consecrated Bishop of the Resurrection, Vicar of the Moscow Diocese. The consecration was performed by the Patriarch of Moscow and All Russia Kirill, Metropolitan of Krutitsky and Kolomna Yuvenally (Poyarkov), Archbishop Proklus (Khazov) of Simbirsk and Melekess, Archbishop Sergius of Samara and Syzran (Poletkin), Archbishop of Istra Arseny of Istra (Kipyarov), Archbishop Eugene of Vereya (Reshetnikov), Archbishop of Sergiev Posad Feognost (Guzikov), Bishop of Penza and Kuznetsk Veniamin (Zaritsky), Bishop of Solnechnogorsk Sergiy (Chashin), Bishop of Elistinsky and Kalmytsky Zinovy.

On 30 May 2011, by decision of the Holy Synod he was appointed Bishop of Anadyr and Chukotka. On 27 July 2011, by the decision of the Holy Synod, he was relieved of his duties as the governor of the Resurrection Monastery in Samara.

From 12 to 23 December 2011, he attended a two-week advanced training course for newly elected bishops of the Russian Orthodox Church in the general church postgraduate and doctoral studies named after Saints Equal to the Apostles Cyril and Methodius.

On 24 December 2015, the Holy Synod, having discussed the state of affairs in the Anadyr and Chukotka dioceses, ordained Bishop Seraphim to retirement and sent him at the disposal of Metropolitan Sergius of Samara and Syzran, having designated Samara as his place of residence.

He died on 9 June 2020, in a hospital in Samara, from the consequences of a stroke, at the age of 51. On 11 June 2020, a funeral service for Bishop Seraphim took place at the Resurrection Monastery in Samara, headed by Metropolitan Sergius of Samara and Novokuibyshevsk (Poletkin), who was co-served by Bishop Sophrony of Kinelsk and Bezenchuksk, Bishop of Otradnensk and Pokhvistriki Metropolitan Narikhvistnevskiy Narikhvistriki.
