= Spanish–Portuguese diocese =

Diocese of the Russian Orthodox Church

Spanish-Portuguese diocese
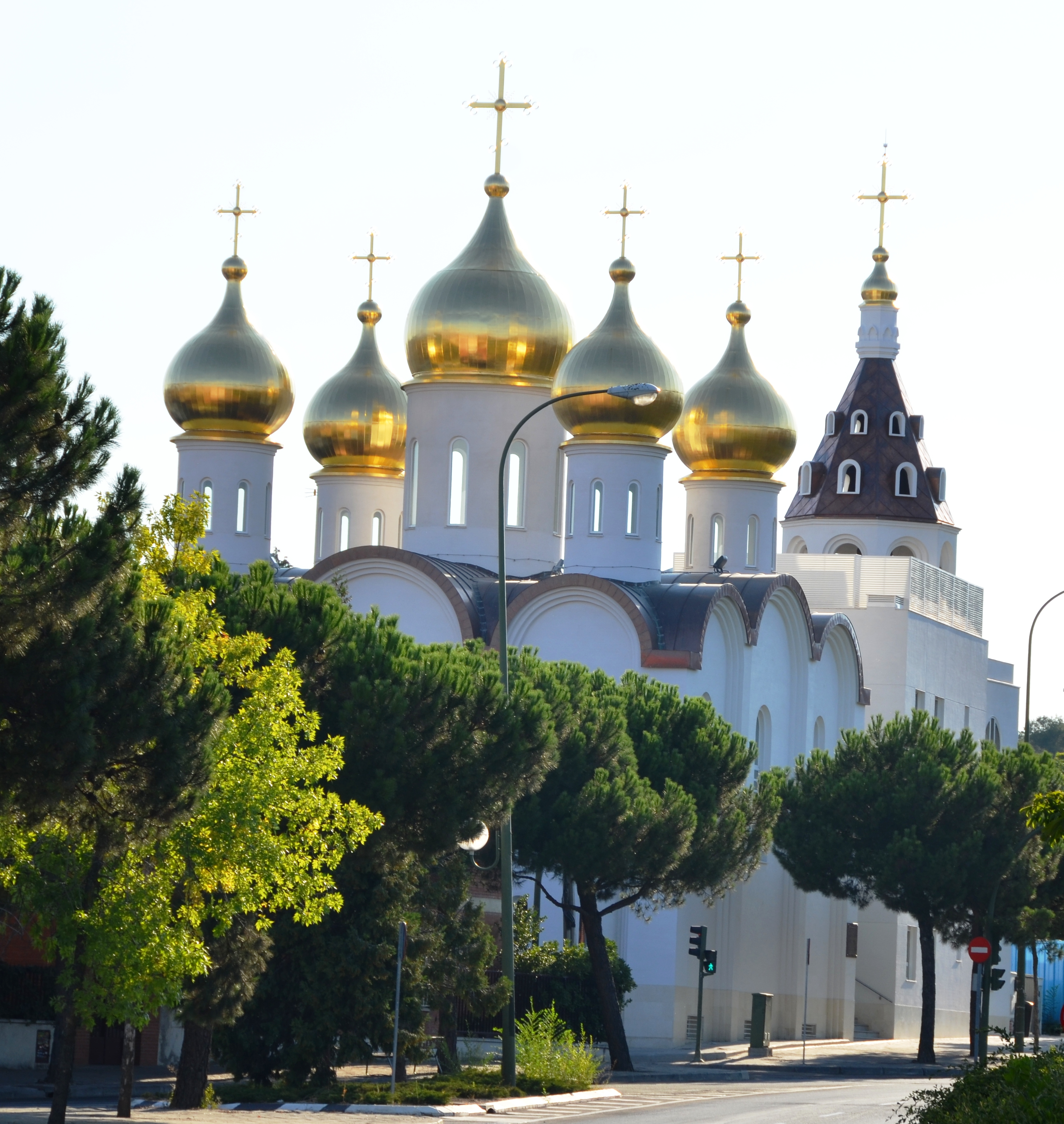
- Russian Orthodox church of Mary Magdalen, Madrid

Location
- Territory: Spain; Portugal; Andorra; Gibraltar
- Ecclesiastical province: Patriarchal Exarchate in Western Europe (Moscow Patriarchate)
- Metropolitan: Anthony (Sevryuk)
- Headquarters: Madrid

Information
- Denomination: Eastern Orthodox Church
- Established: 28 December 2018

Current leadership
- Parent church: Russian Orthodox Church
- Bishop of Madrid and Lisbon: Nestor (Sirotenko)

Website
- http://orthodoxspain.com/

The Spanish-Portuguese diocese (SPD) (Russian: Испанско-Португальская епархия) or Diocese of Madrid and Lisbon (Russian: Мадридская и Лиссабонская епархия, Spanish: Diócesis de Madrid y Lisboa) is a diocese of the Russian Orthodox Church (ROC) created on 28 December 2018. The diocese is part of the Patriarchal Exarchate in Western Europe.

The primate of the SPD is Nestor (Sirotenko) who holds the title of "Archbishop of Madrid and Lisbon".

== History ==
On 28 December 2018, in response to the Ecumenical Patriarchate's actions in Ukraine, the Holy Synod of the Russian Orthodox Church decided to create "a Patriarchal Exarchate in Western Europe [PEWE] with the center in Paris" as well as "a diocese of the Russian Orthodox Church in Spain and Portugal with the center in Madrid" During the same synod, the decision was also taken to create "a Patriarchal Exarchate in South-East Asia [PESEA] with the center in Singapore."

Bishop Nestor (Sirotenko), who was at the time primate of the Russian Orthodox Diocese of Chersonesus, was appointed as primate of the newly created Spanish-Portuguese diocese, with the title of "of Madrid and Lisbon" Bishop John (Roschchin) of Bogorodsk was appointed to replace Bishop Nestor (Sirotenko) as primate of the Russian Orthodox Diocese of Chersonesus and was also appointed as primate of the newly created Patriarchal Exarchate in Western Europe. On the same day, in an interview with Russia-24 channel, Metropolitan Hilarion, head of the Synodal Department for External Church Relations of the ROC of the ROC, declared the ROC "will now act as if they [Constantinople] do not exist at all because our purpose is missionary, our task is to educate, we are creating these structures for ministerial care about our flock, there can be no such deterring factors here", and that the ROC will take charge of the Orthodox faithfuls of its diaspora instead of the Eumenical Patriarchate.

By that time, 73 thousand Russian citizens and 106 thousand Ukrainian ones lived in Spain. 17 priests in 25 parishes of the Russian Orthodox Church served in Spain. 11 parishes and communities were in Portugal. Madrid-based Archpriest Andrei Kordochkin explained: "Parishes are often located several hundred kilometers from each other, it is hardly possible to coordinate its ministry from France. The creation of a new diocese is intended to overcome this isolation and strengthen unity among priests who serve far from each other. In addition, there are a number of issues related to the legal existence of parishes, which can be resolved only if their administration is in the capital"

Bishop Nestor (Sirotenko) was granted the title of archbishop on 3 January 2019 by Patriarch Kirill at Moscow's Dormition Cathedral.

== Notable temples ==
=== Spain ===
There are three Russian Eastern Orthodox temples in Spain co-built as such:

The Cathedral of Saint Mary Magdalene in Madrid (seat of the diocese), the Church of the Michael the Archangel in Altea (Valencian Community) and the Orthodox Church of the Presentation of the Lord in Adeje (Canary Islands).

== Ruling bishops ==
- Nestor (Sirotenko) (28 December 2018 -)

== See also ==
- Eastern Orthodoxy in Spain
- Serbian Orthodox Eparchy of Western Europe
- Assembly of Canonical Orthodox Bishops of Spain and Portugal

Exarchates of the Russian Orthodox Church created for the same reasons and during the same synod:

- Patriarchal Exarchate in Western Europe (Moscow Patriarchate)
- Patriarchal Exarchate in South-East Asia (Moscow Patriarchate)
