= Diocese of Cahul and Comrat =

Moldovan Orthodox diocese

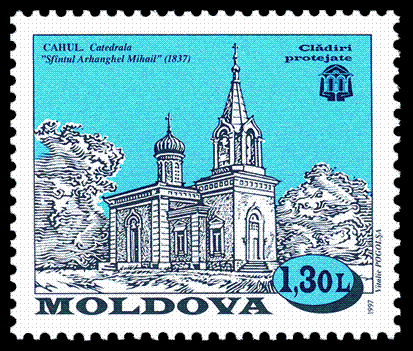
Stamp of Moldova 407

The Diocese of Cahul and Comrat (Romanian: Eparhia de Cahul și Comrat, Russian: Кагульская и Комратская епархия) is a diocese of the Metropolis of Chișinău and All Moldova under the Moscow Patriarchate with its seat in the city of Cahul, Moldova.

== History ==
The Diocese of Cahul and Comrat was established on July 17, 1998, by the Holy Synod of the Russian Orthodox Church to shepherd the Orthodox Church in southern Moldova.

As of 2010 the Eparchy consisted of 138 parishes and 5 monasteries served by 155 full-time priests and 8 deacons. Its current bishop is Anatolie (Botnari).
