= Sergius Chashin =

Russian Orthodox bishop (born 1974)

- Metropolitan and of Singapore and South-East Asia
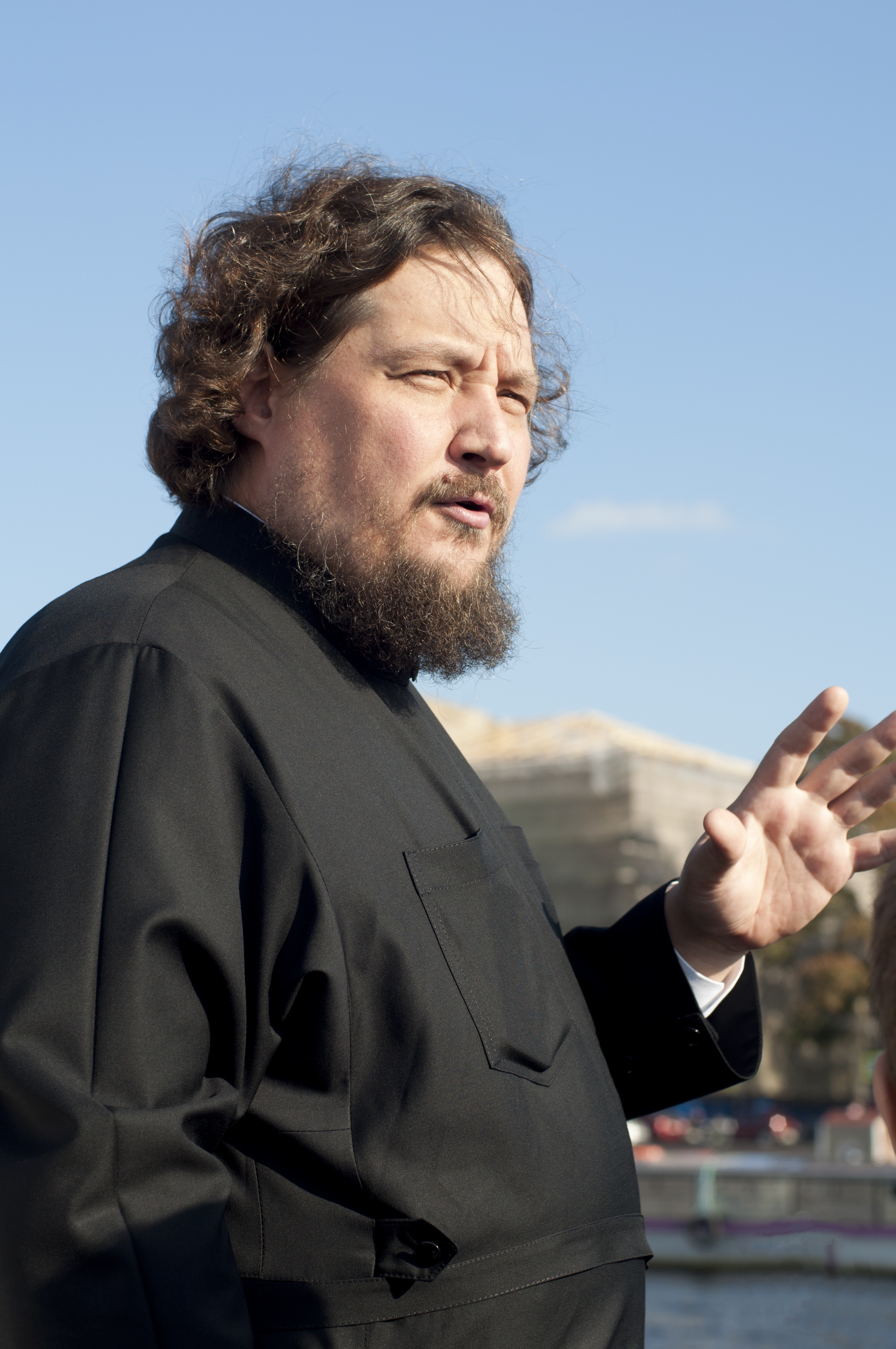
- Bishop Sergius in St. Petersburg. 13 September 2013
- Native name: Сергий
- Church: Russian Orthodox Church
- Metropolis: Patriarchal Exarchate in South-East Asia
- Diocese: Diocese of Singapore
- Appointed: 28 December 2018
- Predecessor: Office established
- Successor: Incumbent

Orders
- Ordination: 7 April 1993 (deacon) by Bishop Benjamin (Pushkar) of Vladivostok and Primorye
- Rank: Metropolitan

Personal details
- Born: Nikolay Nikolayevich Chashin; June 19, 1974 (age 51) Komsomolsky, Russian SFSR, Soviet Union
- Denomination: Eastern Orthodox Church

Metropolitan and Exarch Sergius (Note: Also romanized as Sergy, Sergiy, Sergey or Sergei.) of Singapore and South-East Asia (Russian: Митрополит Сергий, secular name Nikolay Nikolayevich Chashin, Russian: Николай Николаевич Чашин; born June 19, 1974) is a bishop of the Russian Orthodox Church, primate of the Patriarchal Exarchate in South-East Asia (since 2018), head of the Administrative Secretariat of the Moscow Patriarchy (2009-2019), and member of the Inter-Council presence of the Russian Orthodox Church (2009-2019).

== Biography ==
=== Early life ===
In 1991 he graduated from the secondary school of the village of Narovchat in the Penza Oblast.

=== Deacon, priest and vicar bishop of Vladivistok diocese ===
On March 16, 1993, Bishop Benjamin (Pushkar) of Vladivostok and Primorye tonsured him a monk and named him Sergius in honor of St. Sergius of Radonezh. The same Bishop ordained him a deacon on April 7, 1993.

Since August 9, 1993, he was appointed Secretary of the Diocese of Vladivostok.

On September 1, 1995 he was appointed also Vice-rector of the Vladivostok theological college

On February 17, 1996, Bishop Benjamin (Pushkar) of Vladivostok and Primorye ordained Sergius (Chashin) to the priesthood.

On April 2, 1997 he was appointed rector of the Assumption Church in Vladivostok.

In 2000 he was elevated to the rank of hegumen. In May 2005 he was elevated to the rank of archimandrite.

On December 26, 2006, by the decision of the Holy Synod of the Russian Orthodox Church, Archimandrite Sergius was appointed Bishop of Ussuriysk, vicar of the Diocese of Vladivostok. 14 February 2007 he was nominated as bishop. On 15 February 2007 he was ordained bishop.

On July 12, 2007, Bishop Sergius, who arrived in Singapore at the invitation of Russian Orthodox people, celebrated the liturgy at the Armenian Church of Gregory the Illuminator. On October 12, 2007, the Holy Synod accepted into the jurisdiction of the Russian Orthodox Church a newly formed parish in honor of the assumption of the mother of God in the Republic of Singapore; the Holy Synod entrusted Bishop Sergius with the Episcopal care of that parish.

=== Vicar bishop of Moscow diocese ===
On March 31, 2009, at the first 2009 session of the Holy Synod, chaired by newly-enthroned Patriarch Kirill, he was appointed Bishop of Solnechnogorsk, vicar of the Moscow (city) diocese. On April 1, by order of Patriarch Kirill, he was appointed head of the Administrative Secretariat responsible for resolving administrative, economic, personnel, legal, protocol and information issues within the Moscow Patriarchate. On April 9, 2009 by the decree of Patriarch Kirill № 34 he was appointed rector of the Church of the Holy Trinity in Ostankino, Moscow. On May 27, 2009 he was appointed a member of the newly formed Award commission under the Patriarch of Moscow and all Russia. On July 27, 2009, by the decision of the Holy Synod of the ROC, he was included in the newly formed Inter-Council presence of the Russian Orthodox Church.

March 22, 2011 by the decision of the Holy Synod of the ROC he was included into the Supreme Church Council of the Russian Orthodox Church.

On December 26, 2012, by the decision of the Holy Synod of the ROC, Bishop Sergius was entrusted with the archpastoral care of the Michael the Archangel parish in Kuala Lumpur.

On October 21, 2016, by the decision of the Holy Synod of the ROC, he was appointed administrator of Moscow Patriarchate parishes in Vietnam, Indonesia, Cambodia, Laos, Malaysia, Singapore, the Philippines, North and South Korea, keeping the position head of the Administrative Secretariat of the Moscow Patriarchate.

On November 20, 2016 at the Cathedral of Christ the Saviour in Moscow, during the 70th anniversary of Patriarch Kirill, bishop Sergius was elevated to the rank of Archbishop "for the diligent service of the Church of God".

On February 1, 2017, by the decision of the Holy Synod of the ROC, he was included in the then-established Organizational Committee for the implementation of the programme of Church events for the 100th anniversary of the beginning of the era of persecution of the Russian Orthodox Church.

=== Primate of the Patriarchal Exarchate in South-East Asia ===
On December 28, 2018, he was appointed head of the then-created Patriarchal Exarchate in South-East Asia with title the title of "Metropolitan of Singapore and Southeast Asia". On January 7, 2019 during the Great Vespers in the Church of Christ the Savior in Moscow Patriarch Kirill elevated him to the rank of Metropolitan in connection with his appointment as Exarch.

On February 26, 2019, the Holy Synod of the ROC formed Korean, Singaporean, Thailand, and Filipino-Vietnamese dioceses within the Patriarchal Exarchate in South-East Asia and appointed Metropolitan Sergius as the ruling Bishop of the Singapore diocese and locum tenens of the other three dioceses. On April 4 of the same year, Metropolitan Segius was dismissed from the administration of the Korean diocese due to the appointment of Archbishop Theophanes (Kim) as ruling hierarch of that diocese.

On July 23, 2019, he was relieved of the post of head of the Administrative Secretariat of the Moscow Patriarchate, expressing gratitude for the conscientious and effective performance of official duties.

On September 30, 2019, by decision of the Holy Synod of the ROC, he was excluded from the Supreme Church Council.

== Notes ==
Eastern Orthodox Church titles
| Preceded by Position established | Metropolitan of Singapore and South-East Asia, Patriarchal Exarch of South-East Asia; Since 28 December 2018 | Succeeded by Incumbent |
| Preceded by Position established | ruling hierarch of the Diocese of Singapore; Since 26 February 2019 | Succeeded by Incumbent |
| Preceded by Position established | locum tenens of the Diocese of Korea; 26 February – 4 April 2019 | Succeeded by Theophanes (Kim) |
| Preceded by Position established | locum tenens of the Diocese of Thailand; Since 26 February 2019 | Succeeded by Incumbent |
| Preceded by Position established | locum tenens of the Diocese of the Philippines and Vietnam; 26 February – 30 August 2019 | Succeeded by Paul (Fokin) |
