= Diocese of Edineț and Briceni =

Moldovan Orthodox diocese

The Diocese of Edineț and Briceni (Russian: Единецкая и Бричанская епархия, Romanian: Eparhia de Edineț și Briceni) is an eparchy or diocese of the Metropolis of Chișinău and All Moldova under the Moscow Patriarchate with its seat in the city of Edineț, Moldova.

== History ==
The Diocese of Edineț and Briceni was established on October 6, 1998, by the Holy Synod of the Russian Orthodox Church to organize the Orthodox Church in northern Moldova.

As of 2010 the Eparchy consisted of 130 parishes and 4 monasteries served by 130 full-time priests and 10 deacons. Its current bishop is Nicodim (Vulpe).
