= Russian Orthodox Eparchy of Magadan =

Eparchy of Russian Orthodox Church

Diocese of Magadan and Sinegorye
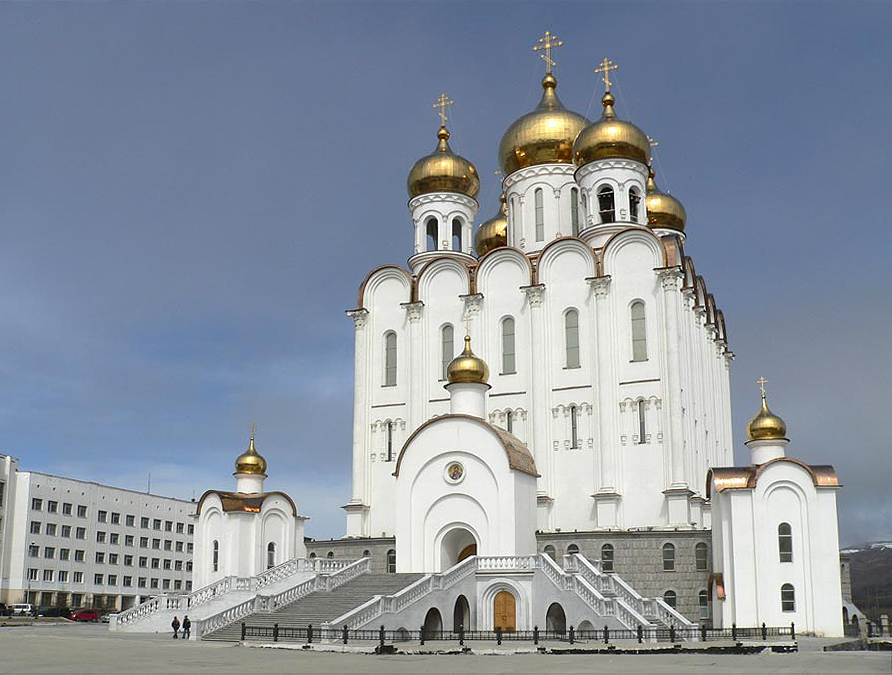
- Cathedral of the Holy Trinity in Magadan, built in 2001-2008

Location
- Deaneries: 2
- Headquarters: Magadan

Statistics
- Parishes: 25
- Churches: 49

Information
- Denomination: Eastern Orthodox
- Sui iuris church: Russian Orthodox Church
- Established: 31 January 1991
- Cathedral: Cathedral of the Holy Trinity
- Language: Old Church Slavonic
- Governance: Eparchy

Website
- magadan-eparchy.ru

The Diocese of Magadan and Sinegorye (Russian: Магаданская и Синегорская епархия) is an eparchy of the Russian Orthodox Church. The Eparchy Cathedral is the Holy Trinity Cathedral in Magadan.

== History ==
The Magadan Diocese was part of the Irkutsk diocese until 1831, when most of it became part of Kamchatka. In 1858, the land was divided into Magadan and the Yakut Kamchatka dioceses, and in 1900, the territory of the latter was transferred to the newly established Diocese of Vladivostok.

In a decision blessed by Patriarch Tikhon on September 11, 1912, the Supreme Church Authority created an independent Department of Kamchatka. The first parish was opened in 1989.

Magadan diocese, which includes Magadan Oblast and Chukotka Autonomous District, was formed by the Holy Synod of the Russian Orthodox Church on February 26,1961.

On July 19, 1999, two further parishes, Anadyr and Chukotka, were added; these are located in the Chukotka Autonomous District.

In 2000, by decision of the Holy Synod of the Russian Orthodox Church, Feofan (Ashurkov) was appointed the new Bishop of Magadan and Sinegorsk. Through his efforts, the first and then subsequent Christmas readings were held with the participation of Alexei Osipov, deacon Andrei Kuraev, and director Nikolai Burlyaev. The religious procession in Gertner Bay on the feast of the Epiphany has also become traditional. Cooperation agreements were concluded with the Department of Education of the Magadan Oblast, and soon electives “Fundamentals of Orthodox Culture” began to operate in city schools. Prayer rooms were opened in the Department of Internal Affairs of the Magadan Oblast and in special regime colonies in the village of Uptar. The most notable event in the life of the Magadan and Sinegorsk diocese was the beginning of construction of the cathedral in honor of the Holy Life-Giving Trinity on the square in the very center of the city. On May 7, 2003, Bishop Gury (Shalimov) was appointed Bishop of Magadan and Sinegorsk. In a short period of time, he visited all the parishes of the diocese, where he performed divine services and communicated with local leadership, the flock and residents of the oblast. On the initiative of Bishop Gury, a shrine of the Far Eastern region - the miraculous Icon of the Mother of God of Albazin - “The Word became Flesh” (Russian: Слово плоть бысть) visited Magadan.

On September 14, 2003, the first Divine Liturgy was celebrated in the Holy Trinity Cathedral, which was under construction. On July 10, 2004, the consecration of the Church of St. Nicholas the Wonderworker in the 3rd microdistrict of Magadan took place. On September 7, 2005, Bishop Gury performed the rite of consecration of the Church of the Icon of the Mother of God of Vladimir in one of the regional centers of the Magadan Oblast - the village of Seymchan.

On August 28, 2006, on the feast of the Dormition of the Blessed Virgin Mary, the ruling bishop and a council of clergy travelled to the coast of the Sea of Okhotsk in the village of Nyuklya, Olsk district, where the consecration of a newly built chapel in honor of St. Apostle Andrew the First-Called, which was erected on the site of the landing in the 20s of the last century of the first geological exploration expedition, which marked the beginning of the industrial development of the territory of Kolyma.

On October 12, 2011, Bishop John (Pavlikhin) became the ruling bishop. He was faced with new tasks to improve all existing churches and build new ones in the Magadan region, to increase the number of clergy, to modernize and revive the Magadan and Sinegorsk diocese.

After the new bishop visited all the parishes of the diocese, the prospects for the construction of churches were discussed in each of them and agreements were reached on their construction. Currently, 20 churches are being built in the Magadan diocese.

As of 2012, the diocese had 12 parishes served by 24 clerics.
