= Russian Orthodox Diocese of Thailand =

Diocese of Thailand

Location
- Territory: Thailand; Cambodia; Laos; Myanmar
- Ecclesiastical province: Patriarchal Exarchate in South-East Asia
- Metropolitan: Sergius (Chashin)

Statistics
- Parishes: 10 in Thailand, 3 in Cambodia, 1 in Myanmar, 1 in Laos

Information
- Denomination: Eastern Orthodox Church
- Rite: Byzantine
- Established: 2019
- Language: Church Slavonic, English, Thai, Khmer

Current leadership
- Parent church: Russian Orthodox Church
- Bishop of Bangkok and Phnom Penh: Sergius (Chashin) locum tenens

Website
- https://dioceseofthailand.org/

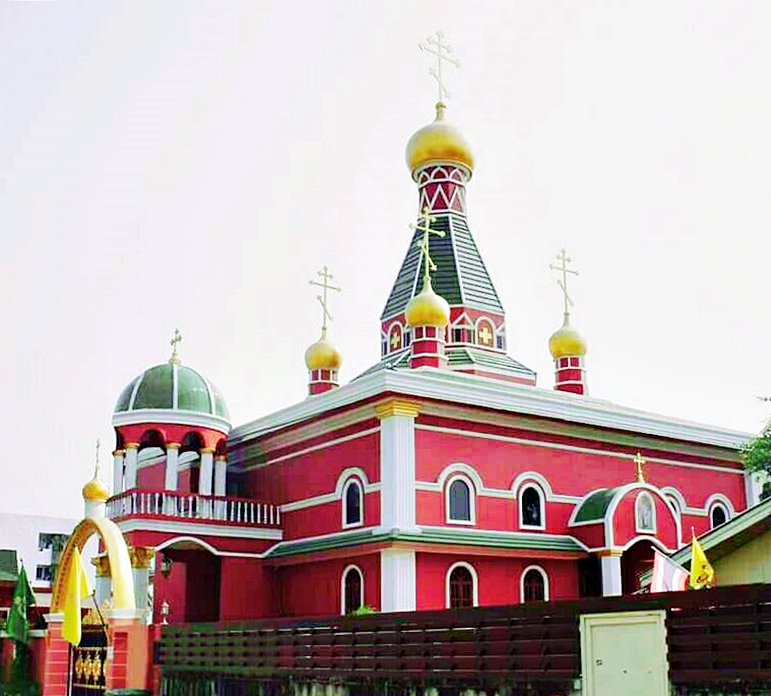
St. Nicholas Cathedral in Bangkok

The Diocese of Thailand (Russian: Таиландская епархия) is a diocese of the Russian Orthodox Church which covers the territory of Thailand, Cambodia, Laos, and Myanmar. It is part of the Patriarchal Exarchate in South-East Asia.

== History ==
=== Eastern Orthodoxy in the region ===
Since the mid-1990s, a large number of immigrants from the former Soviet Union came to Thailand. At that time, there was no Orthodox parishes in the entire territory of the Kingdom. As recalled about the beginning of his service in the Kingdom, Archimandrite Oleg (Cherepanin) said: "this was the end of the 1990s; then in Thailand came Russians to engage business. In Russia back then it was very hard, and in Thailand it was possible to live well. But we had no churches in the vast expanses of the South-East — from Russia to Australia [...] There was only one Orthodox Church in Hong Kong, and it was not under the jurisdiction of the Moscow Patriarchate. The opening of the parish in Thailand is an initiative of Russians who lived in this country." In response to numerous appeals of Russian Orthodox believers, mostly citizens of the former USSR countries, the Holy Synod of the Russian Orthodox Church on December 28, 1999 decided to open the Nicholas parish in Bangkok. By the same decision, the first rector of the newly formed parish was appointed: hegumen Oleg (Cherepanin).

On December 27, 2001, having considered the activities of St. Nicholas parish in Bangkok, the Holy Synod of the Russian Orthodox Church decided to open a Representative Office of the Russian Orthodox Church (Moscow Patriarchate) in the Kingdom of Thailand. Hegumen Oleg (Cherepanin) was chosen to be the representative of the Russian Orthodox Church in Thailand, he was also blessed to carry out spiritual care of Orthodox believers in the Kingdom of Cambodia and the Lao People's Democratic Republic. The mission carried out control and administrative supervision and spiritual care of Orthodox parishes of the Moscow Patriarchate in Thailand, Cambodia and Laos, and determined the General concept of the development of Orthodoxy in these countries on the basis of instructions and directions of the authorities of the Russian Orthodox Church.

=== Russian Orthodox Church in Thailand ===
After the registration of the Russian Orthodox Church in Thailand in 2008, it became possible to open parishes throughout the country, which became 10 by 2018, and for all of them permanent churches were built. In addition, a Theological College was built and opened on the island of Phuket to train clergy from the native people of South-East Asia who converted to Eastern Orthodoxy. Three parishes in Cambodia were established, with permanent churches were built for two of them. Attempts were made to begin missionary work in Laos.

On 21 October 2016, the Holy Synod of the Russian Orthodox Church established the Patriarchal deanery within the Kingdom of Thailand, appointing Archimandrite Oleg (Cherepanin) as Dean of these parishes. At the same time, parishes in Cambodia and Laos, fell under the jurisdiction of Bishop Sergius (Chashin) of Solnechnogorsk.

=== Creation of the PESEA ===
28 December 2018 Holy Synod of the Russian Orthodox Church established the Patriarchal Exarchate in South-East Asia (PESEA) with Sergius (Chashin) as its primate. On February 26, 2019, the Holy Synod abolished the Deanery of the Moscow Patriarchate parishes in Thailand and established the Diocese of Thailand comprising the Kingdom of Thailand, the Kingdom of Cambodia, the Lao People's Democratic Republic and the Republic of the Union of Myanmar. The bishop of the diocese of Thailand bears the title of bishop "of Bangkok and Phnom Penh".

In March 2019, Eastern Orthodox believers in Myanmar formed an Eastern Orthodox community in the country.

== Ruling bishops ==
- Sergius (Chashin) (since 14 February 2019) locum tenens
