= Diocese of Singapore (Russian Orthodox Church) =

Diocese of the Russian Orthodox Church

Location
- Territory: Singapore; Indonesia; Malaysia; East Timor; Papua New Guinea
- Ecclesiastical province: Patriarchal Exarchate in South-East Asia
- Metropolitan: Sergius (Chashin)

Information
- Denomination: Eastern Orthodox Church
- Established: 2019

Current leadership
- Parent church: Russian Orthodox Church
- Metropolitan of Singapore and South-East Asia: Sergius (Chashin)

The Diocese of Singapore (Russian: Сингапурская епархия) is a diocese of the Russian Orthodox Church (ROC) which covers the territory of Singapore, Indonesia, Malaysia, East Timor and Papua New Guinea. It is part of the Patriarchal Exarchate in South-East Asia (PESEA).

The primate of the diocese of Singapore is also the primate of the PESEA.

== History ==
=== Russian Eastern Orthodoxy in the region ===
After the visit of Metropolitan Kirill (Gundyaev) of Smolensk and Kaliningrad to Malaysia and Singapore in 2003, the development of Russian Orthodox communities in these countries begun. In 2009, Bishop Sergius (Chashin) noted: "Patriarch Kirill of Moscow and all Russia, while still Chairman of the Department for External Church Relations, visited many countries of Southeast Asia a few years ago: Malaysia, Indonesia, Singapore and others. During this trip, he repeatedly met with our compatriots. Each time they asked him to create Eastern Orthodox communities where they could gather and pray. Metropolitan Kirill understood perfectly well how important it was to not forget and support Russians living outside their home country in every possible way. But, apparently, the time has not yet come at that time. It was unclear what to do first and what to do next"

On October 12, 2007, the newly formed parish in honor of the Assumption of the Mother of God in Singapore was accepted into the jurisdiction of the Russian Orthodox Church. The Holy Synod of the Russian Orthodox Church entrusted archpastoral care of the parish to Bishop Sergius (Chashin) of Ussuriysk, vicar of the Vladivostok diocese.

Since 2009, the clergy of the Assumption parish in Singapore began to celebrate regular services in the premises of the Russian Center for Science and Culture in Kuala Lumpur. In 2012, the parish of the Russian Orthodox Church, named after Archangel Michael moved to its permanent place in the center of the Malaysian capital. On December 26, 2012, by the decision of the Holy Synod, Bishop Sergius was entrusted with the archpastoral care of that parish.

On November 13, 2018, in Singapore, a solemn ceremony was held for the laying of the first foundation stone of the Church of the Dormition of the Virgin which will be built on the territory of the Russian Cultural Center.

=== Creation within the PESEA ===
On December 28, 2018, the Holy Synod of the Russian Orthodox Church formed the Patriarchal Exarchate in South-East Asia (PESEA), with its headquarter in Singapore. Archbishop Sergius (Chashin), was appointed as primate of the newly created Exarchate, with the title "of Singapore and South-East Asia" On 7 January 2019, he was elevated to the rank of Metropolitan in connection with the latter's appointment as exarch.

The newly established PESEA was not divided into dioceses until February 2019 and therefore de facto was until February 2019 a single diocese. On February 26, 2019, the Holy Synod of the ROC formed the diocese of Singapore within the Republic of Singapore, the Republic of Indonesia and Malaysia, 3 other dioceses of the PESEA were also created.

On 2 November 2019, the clergy of the Indonesian mission of the ROCOR, formerly part of the ROCOR Diocese of Australia and New Zealand, decided to come under the unified spiritual leadership of the Diocese of Singapore due to the lack of ROCOR diocesan structures in Indonesia and on the basis of pastoral considerations. Remainder of ROCOR mission who refused transference into Moscow Patriarchate became Indonesian Orthodox Church (Old Calendarist).

On August 25, 2020, the Holy Synod of the Russian Orthodox Church decided to include the states of East Timor and Papua New Guinea in the sphere of pastoral responsibility of the Diocese of Singapore. Pitirim (Dondenko) was consecrated as auxiliary Bishop of Jakarta with jurisdiction over Indonesia, East Timor and Papua New Guinea on September 1, 2020 by Patriarch Kirill on Donskoy Monastery.

== Ruling bishops ==
- Sergius (Chashin) (28 December 2018/14 February 2019-)
