= Patriarchal Exarchate in South-East Asia =

Exarchate of the Moscow Patriarchate in Southeast Asia

- Патриарший экзархат в Юго-Восточной Азии
- Abbreviation: PESEA
- Classification: Eastern Orthodox Church
- Theology: Eastern Orthodox theology
- Primate: Metropolitan Sergius of Singapore and South-East Asia
- Headquarters: Church of the Dormition of the Most Holy Theotokos, Singapore
- Territory: Singapore, Vietnam, Indonesia, Cambodia, North Korea, South Korea, Laos, Malaysia, Myanmar, the Philippines, and Thailand, East Timor
- Founder: Holy Synod of the Russian Orthodox Church
- Origin: 28 December 2018; Moscow
- Recognition: by the Russian Orthodox Church (28 December 2018), as an exarchate

The Patriarchal Exarchate in South-East Asia (PESEA, Russian: Патриарший экзархат в Юго-Восточной Азии) is an exarchate created by the Russian Orthodox Church (ROC) on 28 December 2018.

The primate of the PESEA is Metropolitan Sergius (Chashin) who holds the title of "Metropolitan of Singapore and South-East Asia".

== History ==
=== Background ===
In East Asia, Eastern Orthodoxy initially developed in Korea in connection with the activities of the Korean spiritual mission of the Russian Orthodox Church in the early 20th century. After the Russian revolution of 1917, in conditions of turmoil and unprecedented dispersion of the flock of the Russian Orthodox Church in different countries of the world, the first Russian parishes appeared in Southeast Asia: in the Philippines and in the Dutch East Indies (now Indonesia), which at that time were subordinate to the Russian Orthodox Church Outside Russia. Missionary activity at that time was not carried out, so the departure of Russian refugees from Southeast Asia led to the disappearance of these parishes. Russian spiritual mission in South Korea in 1955 was transferred to the Patriarchate of Constantinople.

After the collapse of the Soviet Union, immigrants from the former Soviet Union and other traditionally Orthodox countries began to arrive in Southeast Asia. However, there were practically no Eastern Orthodox parishes on this area, and the Moscow Patriarchate did not have any at all. Gradually the situation began to change. In 1999, hegumen Oleg (Cherepanin) founded the St. Nicholas parish in Bangkok. In 2001, hegumen Oleg was appointed head of the then established Representation of The Russian Orthodox Church in the Kingdom of Thailand, which was also responsible for Laos and Cambodia. After the registration of the Russian Orthodox Church in Thailand in 2008, it became possible to open parishes across the country. As of 2018, there were 10, and all of them had permanent churches built. In addition, a theological college was built and opened on the island of Phuket to train people of South-East Asia who converted to Orthodoxy. Three parishes in Cambodia were established, with churches were built for two of them. Since 2014, the Russian Orthodox mission in the Philippines began to develop. In 2018, there were 16 parishes of the Moscow Patriarchate in the Philippines, mainly on the island of Mindanao. Two Russian Orthodox communities were created in Vietnam, one in Vũng Tàu (since 2002) and the other in Hanoi (since 2016). In Indonesia, the parishes of the Moscow Patriarchate were opened in Bekasi, Surabaya, and Bali. In 2007, Act of Canonical Communion with the Moscow Patriarchate which regularized ROCOR as semi-autonomous church within Russian Orthodox Church entails indirect incorporation of pre-existing ROCOR parishes in Indonesia and Philippines into Moscow Patriarchate. Thus, Russian Orthodoxy had both direct and indirect presence in the region.

On October 21, 2016, the Holy Synod of the Russian Orthodox Church appointed Bishop Sergius (Chashin) of Solnechnogorsk as the administrator for the parishes of the Moscow Patriarchate in Southeast and East Asia. He took care of parishes in Cambodia, Indonesia, Laos, Malaysia, Singapore, the Philippines, the DPRK, the Republic of Korea and Viet Nam. A separate structure was formed for Thailand: the Patriarchal Parishes in Thailand, subordinated directly to the Patriarch of Moscow and all Rus'.

=== Creation of the PESEA ===
On 28 December 2018, in response to the Ecumenical Patriarchate's actions in Ukraine, the Holy Synod of the Russian Orthodox Church decided to create "a Patriarchal Exarchate in Western Europe with the center in Paris", as well as "a Patriarchal Exarchate in South-East Asia [PESEA] with the center in Singapore." The "sphere of pastoral responsibility" of the PESEA is Singapore, Vietnam, Indonesia, Cambodia, North Korea, South Korea, Laos, Malaysia, the Myanmar, the Philippines, and Thailand. On the same day, in an interview with Russia-24 channel, Metropolitan Hilarion, spokesman of the ROC, declared the ROC "will now act as if they [Constantinople] do not exist at all because our purpose is missionary, our task is to educate, we are creating these structures for ministerial care about our flock, there can be no such deterring factors here", and that the ROC will take charge of the Eastern Orthodox faithful of its diaspora instead of the Ecumenical Patriarchate.

Archbishop Sergius (Chashin), was appointed as primate of the newly created PESEA, with the title "of Singapore and Southeast Asia". On 7 January 2019, during the evening service in the Church of Christ the Savior in Moscow, Patriarch Kirill elevated Archbishop Sergius (Chashin) to the rank of Metropolitan in connection with the latter's appointment as exarch of the PESEA.

The newly established PESEA was not divided into dioceses until February 2019 and therefore de facto was until February 2019 a single diocese. On February 26, 2019, the Holy Synod of the ROC formed the diocese of Singapore within the Republic of Singapore, the Republic of Indonesia and Malaysia, along with 3 other dioceses of the PESEA namely, Diocese of Korea, Diocese of Thailand, and Diocese of Philippines and Vietnam were also created.

In August 2019, Metropolitan Sergius of Singapore and Southeast Asia said that "today we speak not of the establishment of a 'parallel Church' but of the restoration of the ecclesiastical mission of the Russian Orthodox Church. It is conditioned by the need to provide pastoral care to our compatriots in all parts of the globe including Asia, as well as by the impossibility of our flock at present to partake of the Mysteries in the Church of Constantinople as it has entered into communion with schismatics and invaded the canonical bounds of the Moscow Patriarchate in Ukraine."

On 30 August 2019, Paul (Fokin) was appointed as bishop Bishop of Manila and Hanoi. On 20 September 2019, ROCOR mission in the Philippines was received to Diocese of the Philippines and Vietnam

On 2 November 2019, the clergy of the Indonesian mission of the ROCOR, formerly part of the ROCOR Diocese of Australia and New Zealand, decided to come under the unified spiritual leadership of the Diocese of Singapore due to the lack of ROCOR diocesan structures in Indonesia and on the basis of pastoral considerations. Remainder of ROCOR mission who refused transference into Moscow Patriarchate became Indonesian Orthodox Church (Old Calendarist).

On August 25, 2020, the Holy Synod of the Russian Orthodox Church decided to include the states of East Timor and Papua New Guinea in the sphere of pastoral responsibility of the Diocese of Singapore. Pitirim (Dondenko) was consecrated as auxiliary Bishop of Jakarta with jurisdiction over Indonesia, East Timor and Papua New Guinea on September 1, 2020, by Patriarch Kirill on Donskoy Monastery.

== Structure ==
Since 26 February 2019, the exarchate is divided in four dioceses:

- Diocese of Singapore (comprising Singapore, Indonesia, Malaysia, East Timor and Papua New Guinea), always headed by the primate of the PESEA
- Diocese of Korea (comprising North and South Korea)
- Diocese of Thailand (comprising Cambodia, Laos, Thailand and the Myanmar)
- Diocese of Philippines and Vietnam (comprising the Philippines and Vietnam)

On the same day, Metropolitan Sergius (Chashin) was appointed as ruling bishop of the Singapore diocese, as well as locum tenens of the other 3 dioceses.

On 4 April 2019 Archbishop Theophanes was appointed by the Holy Synod as primate of the diocese of Korea.

== Ruling bishops ==
- Sergius (Chashin) (28 December 2018 -)

== See also ==
- Eastern Orthodox Metropolitanate of Singapore and South Asia
- Philippine Orthodox Church (Moscow Patriarchate) – a church within the PESEA
- Exarchate of the Philippines – an exarchate of the Ecumenical Patriarchate of Constantinople under Metropolis of Hong Kong and Southeast Asia
- Patriarchal Exarchate in Western Europe (Moscow Patriarchate) – exarchate of the Russian Orthodox Church created for the same reasons and during the same synod
