= Nicholas Olhovsky =

Russian Orthodox bishop (born 1974)

His Eminence Nicholas
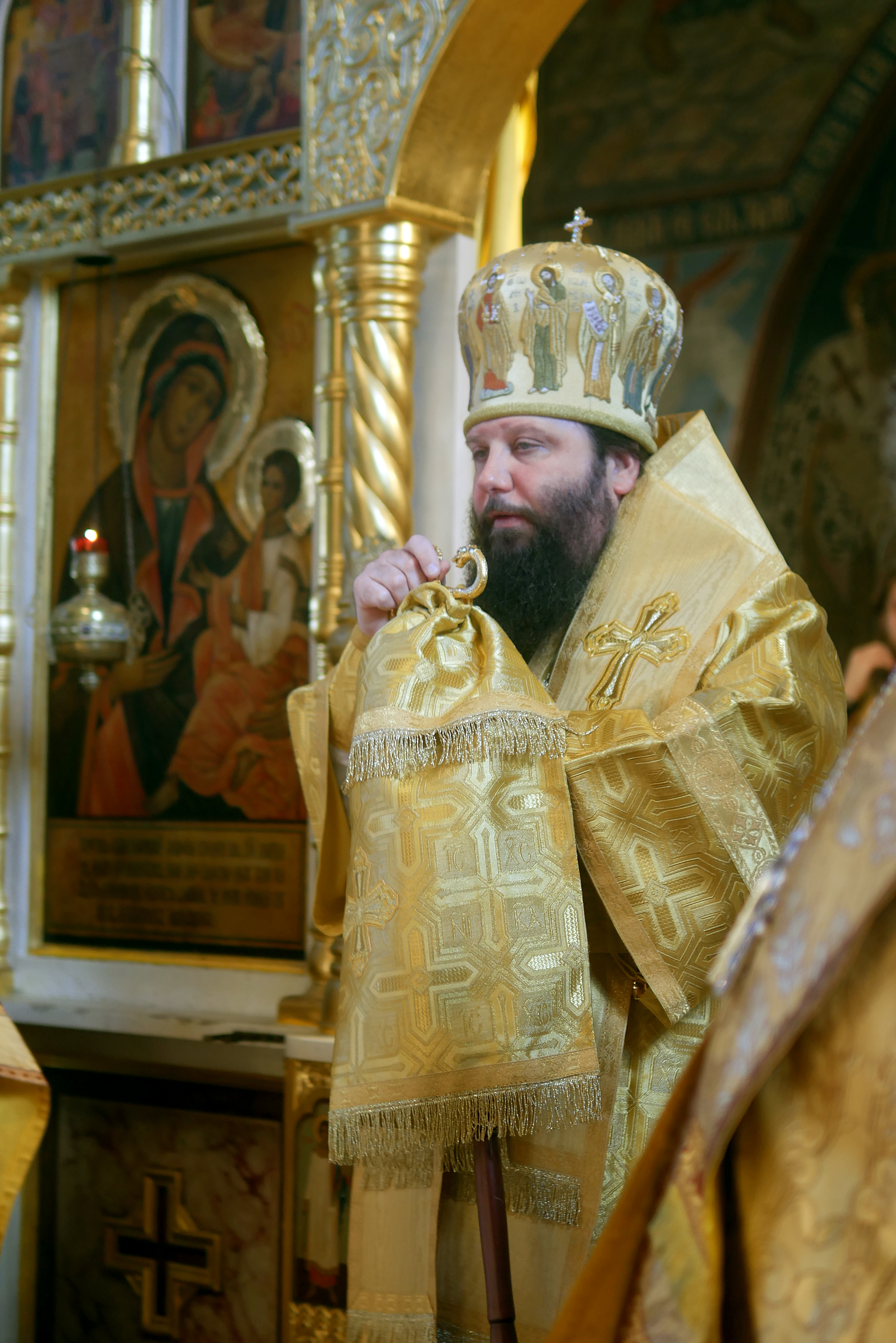
- Nicholas in 2022
- Church: Russian Orthodox Church Outside Russia
- See: First Hierarch of the Russian Orthodox Church Outside of Russia, Eastern American & New York Diocese
- Appointed: 14 September 2022
- Predecessor: Hilarion (Kapral)

Orders
- Ordination: 11 June 2006 (deacon); 1 August 2012 (priest)
- Consecration: 29 June 2014 by Hilarion (Kapral)

Personal details
- Born: Nikolay Alexandrovich Olhovsky; 17 December 1974 (age 51) Trenton, New Jersey, USA
- Profession: 4 April 2014

Metropolitan Nicholas (born Nikolay Alexandrovich Olhovsky, (Note: Russian: Николай Александрович Ольховский) 17 December 1974) is the First Hierarch of the Russian Orthodox Church Outside of Russia and Metropolitan of Eastern America and New York since 14 September 2022.

== Early life ==
He was born on December 17, 1974, in Trenton, New Jersey to Soviet refugees Alexander Nikolaevich Olhovsky and Evdokia Grigorievna (née Rusinovich) fleeing the USSR during World War II. The Olhovsky family were parishioners of the Church of the Holy Dormition. He graduated from the St. Alexander Nevsky Parochial School in Howell, New Jersey, in 1991; and from Hamilton High School West in 1993.

In 1994, Nicholas was tonsured a reader by Bishop Hilarion (Kapral) of Manhattan on the feast of the Dormition of the Theotokos in Trenton.

He received a Bachelor of Theology degree from Holy Trinity Orthodox Seminary in Jordanville, New York, in 1998, during which time he executed obediences in book-binding, iconography, and typography until 2002; meanwhile, he received a bachelor's degree in Communication & Information Design from the State University of New York Institute of Technology in 2000.

== Cell-attendant ==
Reader Nicholas served as the cell-attendant for Archbishop Laurus (Škurla) of Syracuse from March 1999 to March 2008. He accompanied him in May 2004 on the first official visit of ROCOR delegation to Russia.

On 14 November of the same year he married the granddaughter of Mitrophan (Znosko-Borovsky) of Boston, Elizabeth Panteleymonovna Shohov. Metropolitan Laurus ordained him to a subdeacon on January 8, 2005. In May, they visited Metropolitan Laurus's homeland of Carpathian Ruthenia in Slovakia. In May 2006, Subdeacon Nicholas served as a delegate to the IV All-Diasporan Church Council and on Pentecost of that year, June 11, was ordained to the diaconate and assigned to Holy Trinity Monastery in Jordanville, NY. Fr. Nicholas participated in the celebrations of the Act of Canonical Union with the Moscow Patriarchate in Moscow, Russia, and accompanied Metropolitan Laurus on a pilgrimage to the Diocese of Kursk and Ukrainian Orthodox Church. He was awarded the double orarion on June 16, 2006.

== Kursk-Root Icon ==
From July 9–11, 2008 he accompanied the reliquary of the hand of Sts. Elizabeth the New Martyr in the capacity of its caretaker to the Diocese of Australia and New Zealand. In September 2008, Fr. Nicholas was assigned to the staff of the Synod of Bishops in Manhattan, New York.

Fr. Nicholas was appointed in May 2009 to the organizing committee for the first return visit of the Kursk-Root Icon to Russia since the Revolution, and formed part of the official delegation with the icon in September. He again accompanied the icon in 2010, visiting Kiev and Sumy in Ukraine, and finally Kursk, Russia. On 8 September, his spouse, Elizabeth, unexpectedly died, and a memorial fund was set up in her name to assist the frescoing of her home parish of St. Seraphim of Sarov in Sea Cliff, NY.

In December 2010, Fr. Nicholas was appointed Caretaker of the Kursk Root Icon, and in January 2011, appointed a cleric of the Synodal Cathedral of the Mother of God of the Sign in Manhattan and granted residence in the Synod building. He again accompanied the icon to the Diocese of Kursk and also the Metropolia of Kazakhstan in September 2011, traveling in November again to Australia, and on December 11 was elevated to protodeacon.

Within a year on August 1, 2012, Fr. Nicholas was ordained to the priesthood by Metropolitan Hilarion at the dedication of the Church of St. Seraphim of Sarov as a Memorial Church to the Re-Establishment of Unity in the Russian Church and was awarded the nabedrennik.

The Kursk-Root icon traveled a third time to Ukraine and Russia in September 2012 with Fr. Nicholas, visiting with Archbishop Mark (Arndt) of Berlin the Dioceses of Samara, Kursk and Perm; and in December to Seattle and Hawaii of the Diocese of San Francisco and Western America. He was awarded the kamilavka and gold pectoral cross on January 6, 2013, by the Synod of Bishops, and a few months later accompanied the Kursk-Root Icon to the Montreal and Canadian Diocese. In November 2013, was a delegate accompanying the Icon to Japan and to the Primorye Metropoliate of the Russian Orthodox Church. In 2013, he accompanied Archbishop Kyrill (Dmitrieff) of San Francisco and the Kursk Root Icon to the Diocese of Montreal and Canada, the Orthodox Church in Japan, and the Metropolia of Primorye.

== Vicar Bishop ==
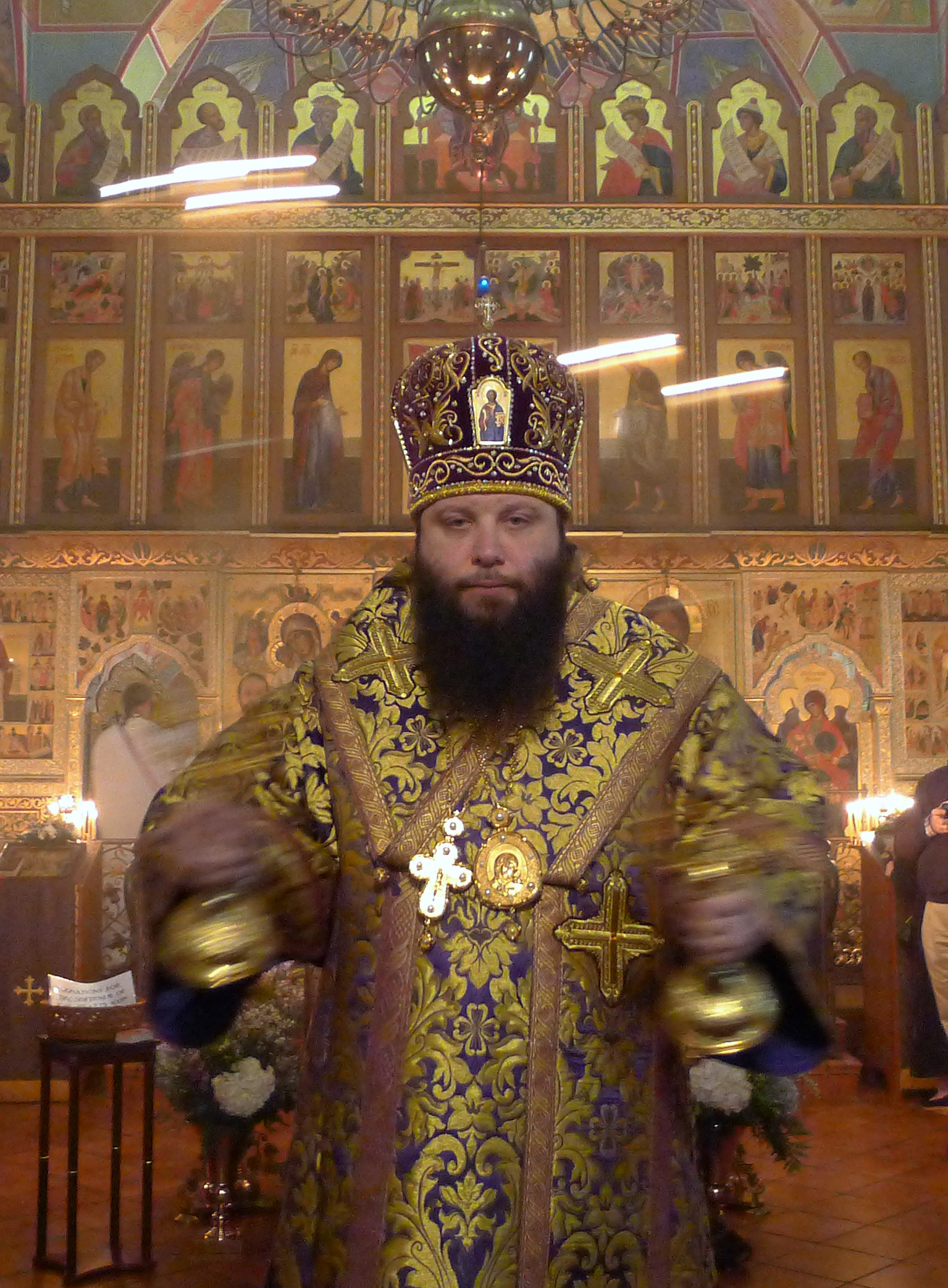
Metropolitan Nicholas in 2016

After the retirement of Bishop Jerome (Shaw) from the See of Manhattan on July 10, 2013, the Synod of Bishops of ROCOR deliberated during a meeting that December and on the eve of the feast of the Kursk-Root icon, decided upon the candidacy of Fr. Nicholas Olhovsky to become the next vicar bishop of Manhattan. On March 19, 2014, the Holy Synod of the Russian Orthodox Church confirmed this election.

On April 4, 2014 at Holy Trinity Monastery in Jordanville, New York, after co-serving an akathist before the icon of the Protection of the Mother of God containing a relic of the Theotokos's belt, Archimandrite Luke (Murianka) tonsured him a monk (into the little schema) and although not changing his name, his patron saint was changed to St. Nicholas of Japan.

On April 27 of the same year, at the Cathedral of the Holy New Martyrs and Confessors of Russia in Munich, Archbishop Mark (Arndt) of Berlin and Germany elevated him to the rank of Archimandrite.

On June 28 of the same year at the Joy of All Who Sorrow in San Francisco, he was nominated Bishop of Manhattan. The nomination ceremony was led by Metropolitan Hilarion of Eastern America and New York, in the concelebration of members of the Bishops' Council of the Russian Church Abroad and hierarchs who arrived at the celebrations dedicated to the 20th anniversary of the glorification of St. John (Maximovich) of Shanghai and San Francisco.

On June 29 of the same year at the Cathedral of Joy of All Who Sorrow in San Francisco, he was consecrated Bishop of Manhattan. The consecration was performed by: Metropolitan Hilarion (Kapral) of Eastern America and New York, Archbishop Mark (Arndt) of Berlin-Germany and Great Britain, Archbishop Kyrill (Dmitrieff) of San Francisco and Western America, Archbishop Justinian (Ovchinnikov) of Naro-Fominsk, Archbishop Gabriel (Chemodakov) of Montreal and Canada, Archbishop Michael (Donskoff) of Geneva and Western Europe, Bishop Peter (Loukianoff) of Cleveland, Bishop John (Bērziņš) of Caracas and South America, Bishop George (Schaefer) of Mayfield, Bishop Theodosius (Ivashchenko) of Seattle, Bishop Panteleimon (Shatov) of Orekhovo-Zuyevo, Bishop Jonah (Cherepanov) of Obukhiv and Bishop Nicholas (Soraich).

On May 17, 2022, after the death of Metropolitan Hilarion (Kapral), by the decision of the Synod of Bishops of the ROCOR, he was appointed acting administrator of the Eastern American Diocese.

== First Hierarch of ROCOR ==
On September 13, 2022, the ROCOR Council of Bishops, which met in the Cathedral of Our Lady the Sign in New York, elected him the seventh First Hierarch of the Russian Orthodox Church Outside of Russia. He also remains Metropolitan of Eastern America and New York.

On September 14, 2022, the Holy Synod of the Russian Orthodox Church approved the decision of the Council of Bishops of the Russian Church Abroad on the election of Bishop Nicholas of Manhattan as the First Hierarch of ROCOR and Metropolitan of Eastern America and New York.

On 17 September, 2022, at the end of all-night vigil at the Synodal Cathedral of Our Lady “of the Sign” in New York, Bishop Nicholas of Manhattan, newly-elected First Hierarch of the ROCOR, emerged through the Royal Doors to the ambo in his black klobuk and common episcopal mantle. Metropolitan Mark of Berlin and all Germany and Archbishop Kyrill of San Francisco and Western America then endowed the blue mantle and white klobuk to him, which he donned with the aid of attending subdeacons.

On 18 September 2022, ceremonies surrounding the enthronement of Metropolitan Nicholas of Eastern America and New York, newly-elected Primate of the Russian Orthodox Church Outside of Russia, took place.
