= George Schaefer (bishop) =

Bishop of the Russian Orthodox Church Outside of Russia

His Eminence George of Sydney, Australia and New Zealand
- Church: Russian Orthodox Church Outside of Russia
- Diocese: Diocese of Australia and New Zealand
- Elected: May 15, 2008
- Predecessor: Metropolitan Hilarion of New York

Orders
- Consecration: December 7, 2008 by Gabriel (Chemodakov), Peter (Loukianoff), John (Bērziņš)

Personal details
- Born: Paul Macarius Schaefer; May 25, 1950 (age 76) Belleville, Illinois
- Denomination: Eastern Orthodox Christianity
- Occupation: Ruling Bishop of the Australia and New Zealand Diocese of ROCOR
- Education: Southern Illinois University

Archbishop George (secular name Paul Macarius Schaefer; May 25, 1950) is a bishop of the Russian Orthodox Church Outside of Russia, archbishop of Sydney, Australia and New Zealand, and former abbot of the Holy Cross Monastery in Wayne, West Virginia.

== Biography ==
=== Early life ===
Paul Schaefer was born on May 25, 1950, in Belleville, Illinois to Francis and Claire Schaefer, a devout Catholic family of German descent. While at a Roman Catholic elementary school, he attended mass daily, served as an altar boy and sang in the church choir.

In 1968 he graduated from a Roman Catholic secondary school and then attended Southern Illinois University from 1968 to 1972.

After graduating, he saw problems in the Roman Catholic Church; he stopped attending services and began to search for the truth, including in Buddhist and other eastern sources.

In 1974, he moved to San Jose, California, and found out about Orthodox Christianity through a Greek man. He was baptised that year at the Greek Orthodox Church in Modesto, California, and given the name Makarios (or Macarius) in honor of Saint Macarius the Great. He started attending St. Nicholas Church, San Jose, before moving to the Greek Orthodox Cathedral in San Francisco, as well as a Russian church.

His brother, Rev. Edward Schaefer, is a Catholic priest serving in the Diocese of Belleville, Illinois.

=== Monastic life ===
In January 1975, Makarios visited Mount Athos, where he decided to become a monk. He later visited the St. Herman of Alaska Monastery, Platina, California, where he met Seraphim (Rose) and Herman (Podmoshensky) and was immersed in the monastic life. They suggested he enrol in seminary, which he did, entering Holy Trinity Orthodox Seminary in September 1975.

On Christmas, January 7, 1976, Makarios was made a novice by Archbishop Averky (Taushev). As a novice, his obediences in the monastery were working in the farm and cemetery.

He spent the next summer in Platina, California, and helped Fr. Seraphim and Fr. Herman to print books and do other jobs. Divine services were in English unlike Jordanville: "I understood every word, which touched my heart".

On Friday of the First Week of Great Lent, 1979, after a few years in Holy Trinity Monastery in Jordanville, he was tonsured a rassophore monk. On Friday of the First Week of Great Lent, 1980, he was tonsured into the small schema and given the name Mitrophan in honor of Saint Mitrophan of Voronezh. On Palm Sunday of 1980, he was ordained a subdeacon and a couple of months thereafter, he graduated from Holy Trinity Seminary.

In June 1981, he was given a blessing by Archbishop Laurus (Škurla) to relocate to Mount Athos. Initially, he lived in the Skete of Prophet Elijah for several months, a strict skete which was then connected with ROCOR.

On the advice of elder Nicodemus of Karoulia, he then moved to an English-speaking cell within Koutloumousiou monastery with four other ROCOR monks, which was one that other monasteries would often send American visitors to. He became acquainted with St. Paisios the Athonite while there. He was tonsured to the great schema by Hieromonk Chrysostomos of Koutloumousiou monastery and given the name George in honor of Saint George the Great-Martyr.

In February 1986, he returned to Holy Trinity Monastery and started working on the Print Shop of Saint Job of Pochaev in 1986, where he worked until 1998. He assumed editorial duties on "Orthodox Life", an English-language religious publication of the monastery, from 1992 to his consecration as a bishop in 2008.

On the feast of St. Michael, 1986, he was ordained a hierodeacon. On Palm Sunday, 1987 he was ordained a hieromonk.

In 1994, he was appointed as economos of Holy Trinity Monastery.

In September 1998, he was elevated to the rank of hegumen.

On September 5, 2005, at the Holy Trinity Monastery in Jordanville, during the celebration of the 75th anniversary of the monastery, Metropolitan Laurus (Škurla) elevated him to the rank of archimandrite.

He is the author of several articles and translations published in "Orthodox Life". He translated several sayings of the Optina Elders published in the book "Living Without Hypocrisy", published in 2006 by Holy Trinity Monastery Press. He also served as confessor and spiritual father of the Hermitage of the Holy Cross in Wayne, West Virginia, the largest English-language monastery of the Russian Orthodox Church Outside of Russia.

=== Life as a Bishop ===
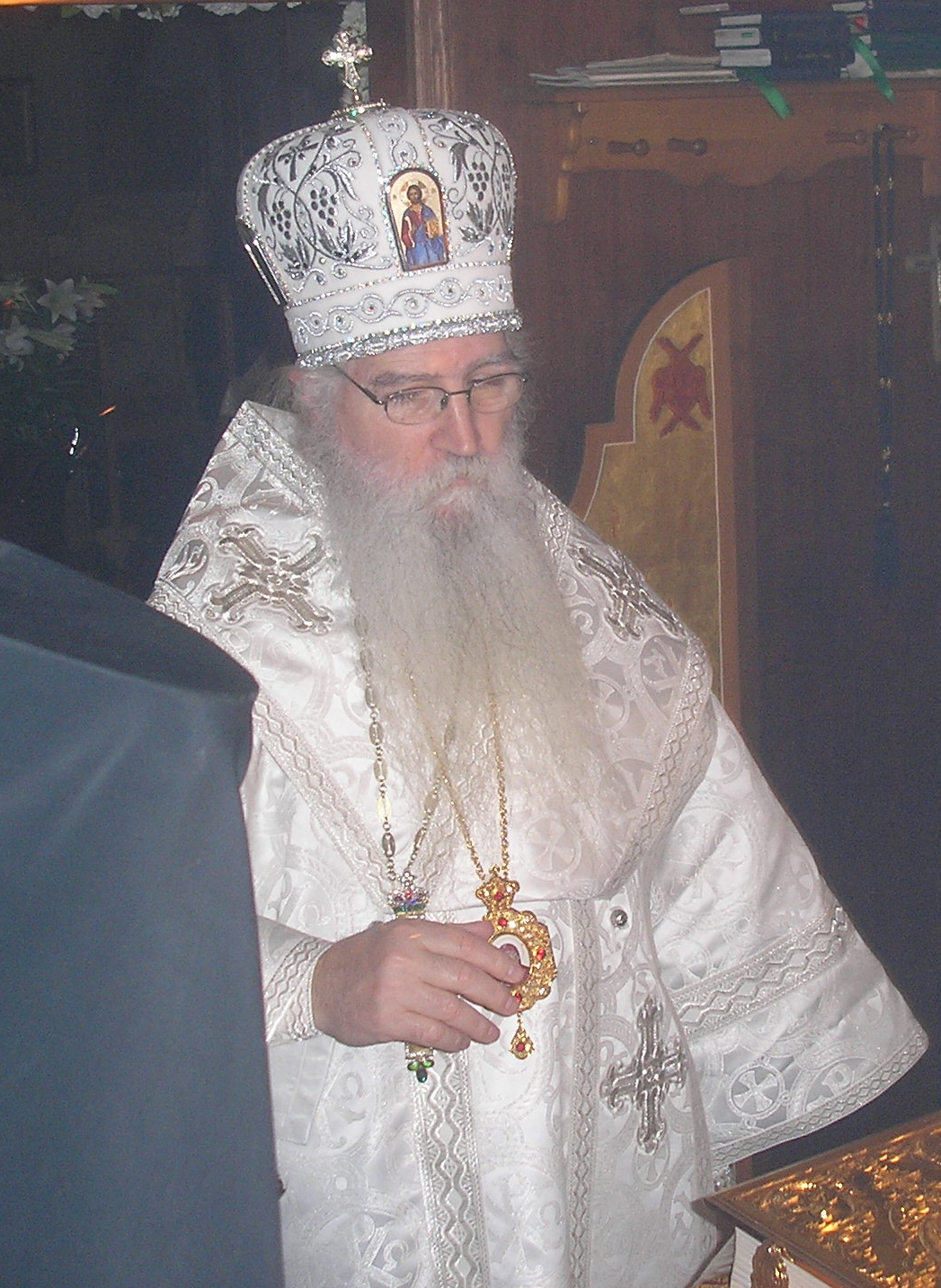
Bishop George at the Altar during Paschal Matins at Holy Cross Monastery

On May 15, 2008, the Synod of Bishops of the ROCOR decreed to send the curricula vitae of archimandrite George (Schaefer) and Protopresbyter John Shaw along with accompanying appeals to Patriarch Alexius II of Moscow and All Russia for the confirmation of their candidacies for episcopal consecration. The Holy Synod of the Russian Orthodox Church confirmed their election (together with previously elected archimandrite Theodosius (Ivashchenko)) on June 23, 2008. Archimandrite George, having no access to the internet, found out about his appointment from the congratulations of friends.

On December 7, 2008, Archimandrite George was consecrated bishop at Holy Trinity Monastery in Jordanville, New York, by Bishop Gabriel (Chemodakov) of Montreal and Canada, Bishop Peter (Loukianoff) of Cleveland and Bishop John (Bērziņš) of Caracas, receiving the title of Bishop of Mayfield. Metropolitan Hilarion (Kapral), then primate of the ROCOR, could not be present, as was preparing to attend the funeral of Patriarch Alexius II in Russia.

On May 7, 2009, given that Bishop George's place of residence at the time of his consecration was the Hermitage of the Holy Cross in Wayne, West Virginia, he was elected abbot of that monastery.

In May 2009, the Synod of Bishops of ROCOR decided to form a commission to study the relationship with the Orthodox Church in America and to hold joint meetings to discuss the sources of the division between the ROCOR and the OCA, with Bishop George assigned as president of the commission. Meanwhile, the Synod of Bishops also decided to reassign the Holy Cross Hermitage, which formerly was a metochion (affiliated church; podvorie in Russian) of the Holy Trinity Monastery, to the jurisdiction of the Eastern American Diocese.

On May 25, 2010, in recognition of his labour for the Church and his 60th birthday, Bishop George was awarded the Order of St. Seraphim of Sarov, 2nd degree, by Patriarch Kirill of Moscow.

On January 27, 2013, Bishop George attended the enthronement of Metropolitan Tikhon of All America and Canada, at St. Nicholas Cathedral in Washington, D.C. After the occasion, Bishop George delivered a congratulatory message on behalf of Metropolitan Hilarion of Eastern America and New York, and gifted the newly-enthroned Metropolitan Tikhon a panagia and copy of the Myrrh-streaming "Hawaiian" Iveron Icon of the Theotokos.

In June 2013, he was sent by Metropolitan Hilarion to the Australian and New Zealand Diocese of the ROCOR as a temporary appointment, to celebrate the divine services in parish churches, especially for parish feast days.

On October 7, 2014, he was appointed vicar-bishop of Metropolitan Hilarion in the Australian and New Zealand Diocese with the title "Bishop of Canberra". He arrived in Sydney on April 16, 2015, greeted by Metropolitan Hilarion and clergy of the diocese. The following day, a service was held at the Diocesan Cathedral in Strathfield, where Metropolitan Hilarion introduced Bishop George to the faithful. Bishop Irinej (now Serbian bishop of Eastern America) represented the Serbian Orthodox Eparchy of Australia and New Zealand at the event.

On 21 September 2022, the Synod of Bishops of the Russian Orthodox Church Outside of Russia, during deliberations on the expansion of the episcopacy and clergy, appointed Bishop George of Canberra as the Ruling Bishop of the Diocese of Australia and New Zealand with the title "Bishop of Sydney, Australia and New Zealand".

A meeting of the Synod of Bishops on December 8, 2023, in New York heard Metropolitan Nicholas, First Hierarch of the Russian Church Outside of Russia propose the elevation of Bishop George to the rank of archbishop. Metropolitan Nicholas formally elevated Bishop George to the rank of archbishop on the 12th of July, 2024, after the liturgy service took place at Saints Peter and Paul Russian Orthodox Cathedral in Strathfield, New South Wales, where Archbishop George serves as a member of the clergy.
