= Joasaph (McLellan) =

American Eastern Orthodox priest

Archimandrite Joasaph (secular name Francis Ronald McLellan Jr.; January 24, 1962 – December 18, 2009) was an American scholar and priest of the Russian Orthodox Church Outside Russia in the last year of his life. From February 2009 until his death he served as Chief of the Russian Orthodox Ecclesiastical Mission in Jerusalem of the Russian Orthodox Church Outside Russia.

== Life ==
He was born in Boston on January 24, 1962 to Francis James McLellan, Sr. and Polina B. McLellan (née Rooney).

He attended the Boston public schools and Roxbury Latin, and graduated from Commonwealth School. In 1985 he earned his Bachelor of Theology from Holy Trinity Seminary in Jordanville, New York, where he graduated at the top of his class and was given the honor of delivering in English the parting address to professors and seminarians. In 1996 he received his Master of Arts and Ph.D. degrees from Brown University in Slavic Language and Literature. His dissertation title was: "The Hilandar Gospel and its Place in the Textual History of the Church Slavonic Tetraevangelion". He was a founding faculty member of the Summer School of Liturgical Music at Holy Trinity Seminary.

From 2000 to 2004 he taught Russian at the University of Missouri in Columbia, Missouri. He instituted there a pre-Lenten meal of bliny for the students at his "tiny, little apartment". After University of Missouri he taught at Princeton University.

At the request of the Metropolitan Laurus (Škurla) he left his teaching position at Princeton and entered the Holy Trinity Monastery in Jordanville, New York in early September 2008. On October 10 he was tonsured there to the small schema by Metropolitan Hilarion (Kapral), and received the name of Bishop Ioasaph of Belgorod. On the following day Fr Joasaph was ordained to the diaconate. On December 7, 2008 newly consecrated Bishop George (Schaefer) ordained hierodeacon Joasaph to the priesthood. Fr. Joasaph prepared to serve the Russian Ecclesiastical Mission in Jerusalem.

The Synod of Bishops of ROCOR appointed him chief of the ROCOR Russian Ecclesiastical Mission in Jerusalem, and on February 8, 2009 at the Cathedral of the Holy New Martyrs and Confessors of Russia in Munich, Archbishop Mark (Arndt) of Berlin elevated him to the rank of archimandrite, and then left with him to Jerusalem.

As the head of the mission, Fr. Joasaph served at Ascension Convent on the Mount of Olives and Gethsemane Convent. In Israel he had to deal with property issues. Archimandrite Joasaph also worried about the lack of clergy. He was the first chief of the ROCOR Russian Ecclesiastical Mission in Jerusalem since 1948, who served in the new Cathedral of All Saints Resplendent in the Russian Land of the Russian Ecclesiastical Mission of the Moscow Patriarchate. At Archimandrite Joasaph tenure the ROCOR restored the fullness of ecclesial communion with the Greek Orthodox Church of Jerusalem: On May 5, 2009 a concelebration was held at the Life-bearing Tomb of the Lord by Metropolitan Aristarchos (Peristeris), Secretary of the Holy Synod of the Jerusalem Patriarchate and Bishop Agapit (Goratchek) of Stuttgart, Vicar of the German Diocese.

On August 11, 2009, Archimandrite Joasaph, in the presence of the Kursk-Root Icon of the Mother of God, performed a pannikhida at the grave of Serge Semenenko in Mount Auburn Cemetery, Cambridge, MA who donated a building to the Russian Orthodox Church Outside of Russia in Manhattan. This fulfilled the wishes of the late Metropolitan Laurus who had wished to locate his gravesite and perform a memorial service for him.

Fr. Joasaph underwent treatment by Dr. Jeffrey Clark at Massachusetts General Hospital from August 2009 until his death on December 18, 2009 from cholangiocarcinoma, aged 47.

His pannychida was held at Holy Epiphany parish in Boston on Sunday evening 20 December, followed by his funeral the following day at Holy Trinity Monastery presided at by Bishop Gabriel (Chemodakov) of Montreal and Canada, Bishop Peter (Loukianoff) of Cleveland and Bishop George (Schaefer) of Mayfield. He is buried in the monastic cemetery near the main church.
