= Russian Orthodox Eparchy of Eastern America and New York =

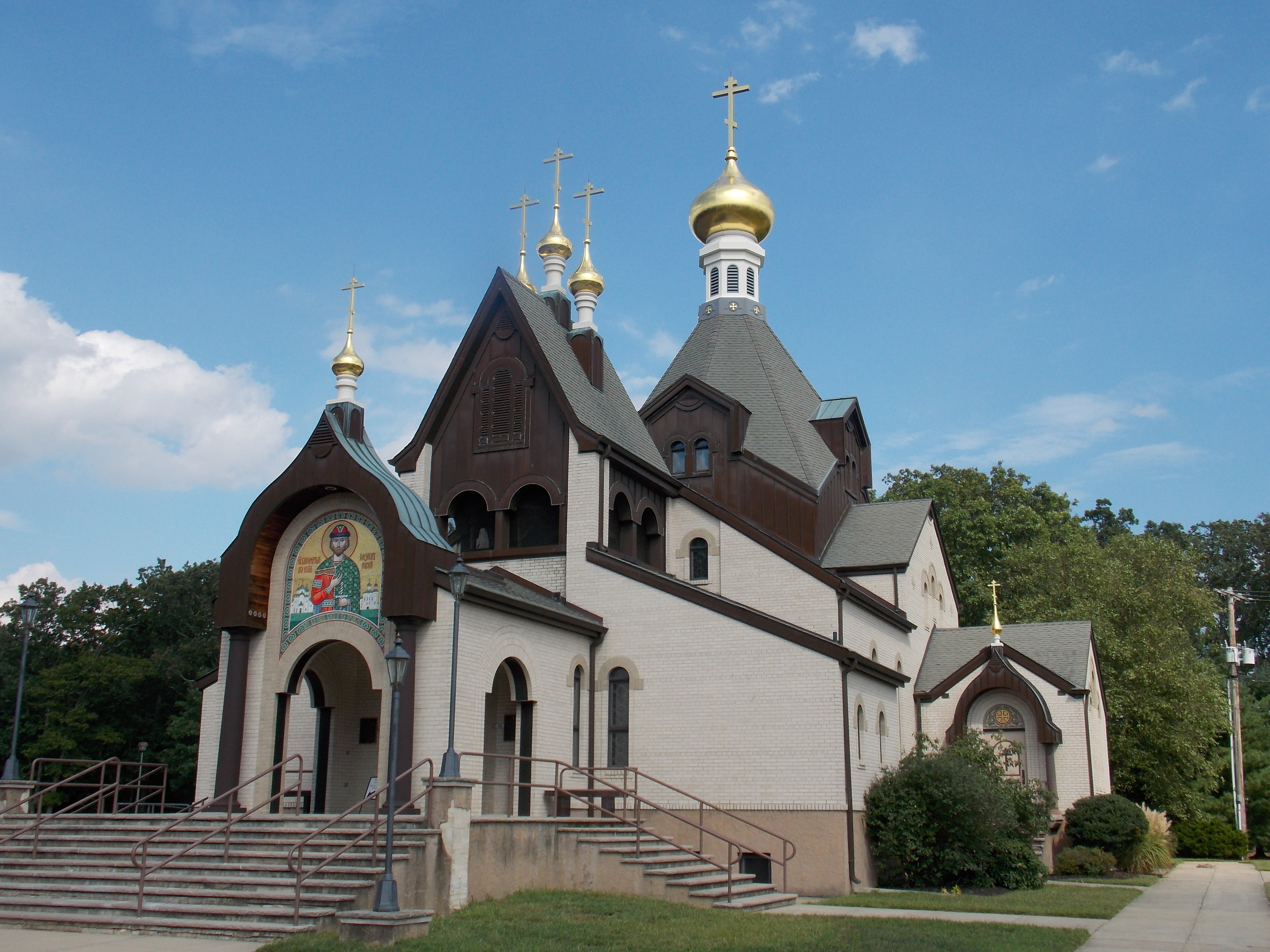
St. Alexander Nevsky Cathedral - Howell, New Jersey 02

The Russian Orthodox Eparchy of Eastern America and New York (Russian: Восточно-Американская и Нью-Йоркская епархия, romanized: Vostochno-Amerikanskaya i Nyu-Yorkskaya eparkhiya) is a diocese of the Russian Orthodox Church Outside Russia that is the see of its First Hierarch. The current First Hierarch is Metropolitan Nicholas (Olhovsky) since September 14th, 2022.

== History ==
September 4, 1934 the Synod of bishops of ROCOR decided to divide the North American diocese on 2 dioceses: Eastern American and Western American. The Eastern American diocese was headed by Archbishop Vitaly (Maximenko).

In its present form the diocese was formed after November Cleveland Sobor in 1946 when clergy and laity of the Northern American Mitropolis adopted a resolution by which the Metropolitan District limit his contacts with the Moscow Patriarchate and the Synod of ROCOR. However, much of the parishes refused to be separated from the ROCOR. After the rupture of communion with Metropolitan Theophilus (Pashkovsky), ROCOR regained its jurisdiction in America and received about 40 parishes emerged from the Metropolitan District. Administration of these parishes was charged to Archbishop Vitaly, who received the title "Archbishop of Eastern America and Jersey City".

== Bishops ==
=== Ruling bishops ===
- Vitaly (Maximenko), September 4, 1934 – 1959
- Anastasius (Gribanovsky), First Hierarch of ROCOR, 1959 – May 31, 1964
- Philaret (Voznesensky), First Hierarch of ROCOR, May 31, 1964 – November 21, 1985
- Vitaly (Ustinov), First Hierarch of ROCOR, January 22, 1986 – August 10, 2001
- Laurus (Škurla), First Hierarch of ROCOR, October 27, 2001 – March 16, 2008
- Hilarion (Kapral), First Hierarch of ROCOR, May 18, 2008 – May 16, 2022
- Nicholas (Olhovsky), First Hierarch of ROCOR, since September 14, 2022

=== Vicars ===
==== Bishops of Manhattan ====
- James (Toombs), July 21, 1951 – October 21, 1955
- Laurus (Škurla), August 13, 1967 – June 18, 1976
- Gregory (Grabbe), May 12, 1979 – November 1981
- Hilarion (Kapral), December 10, 1984 – December 1995
- Gabriel (Chemodakov), October 5, 1996 – May 14, 2008
- Jerome (Shaw), December 10, 2008 – July 10, 2013
- Nicholas (Olhovsky), June 29, 2014 - September 14, 2022
- Theodosius (Ivashchenko), since December 9, 2025

==== Bishop of Mayfield ====
- George (Schaefer), December 7, 2008 – October 7, 2014

==== Bishop of Erie ====
- Daniel (Alexandrov), August 14, 1988 – April 26, 2010

==== Bishop of Boston ====
- Mitrophan (Znosko-Borovsky), November 24, 1992 – February 15, 2002
- Michael (Donskoff), May 2002 – May 2006
- Michael (Crowley), since February 15, 2026

==== Archbishops of Syracuse and Holy Trinity ====
- Abercius (Taushev), May 25, 1953 – April 13, 1976
- Laurus (Škurla), July 18, 1976 – October 25, 2001
- Luke (Murianka)

==== Bishop of Washington ====
- Nikon (Rklitski), 1960 – September 4, 1976
- Gregory (Grabbe), 1981 – January 1986
- Hilarion (Kapral), 1995 – June 20, 1996

==== Archbishop of Rockland ====
- Andrew (Rymarenko), March 2, 1968 – July 12, 1978
- John (Legky), October 2, 1994 – March 3, 1995

==== Bishop/Archbishop of Florida ====
- Nikon (Rklitski), 1960 – September 4, 1976

== Sources ==
- Eastern American and New York Diocese of ROCOR
- Восточно-Американская и Нью-Йоркская епархия (РПЦЗ)
