= Jerome Shaw =

Bishop Jerome Shaw
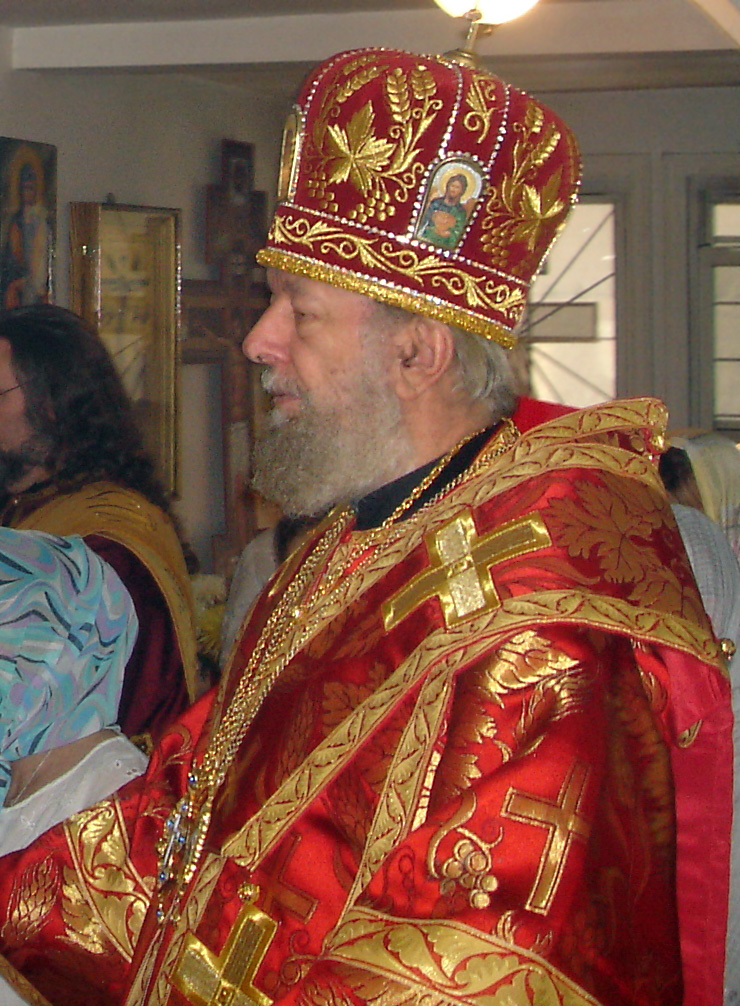
- Native name: John Robert Shaw
- Church: Russian Orthodox Church Outside of Russia
- Elected: May 15, 2008

Orders
- Ordination: April 11, 1976 by Nikon (Rklitski)
- Consecration: December 10, 2008 by Peter (Loukianoff), Gabriel (Chemodakov), John (Bērziņš)

Personal details
- Born: John Robert Shaw; December 21, 1946 (age 79) Waterbury, Connecticut, United States
- Profession: Translator, slavist, theologian
- Education: University of Pittsburgh

Jerome Shaw, born John Robert Shaw and commonly known as Bishop Jerome (born December 21, 1946), is a retired bishop of the Russian Orthodox Church Outside of Russia. He was formerly the auxiliary bishop of Manhattan. He is a Slavist, theologian and polyglot, adherent of the Western Rite Orthodoxy.

== Life ==
John Robert Shaw was born on December 21, 1946, and grew up in a small New England town. He came of an old American family, of "Anglo" ancestry, and was raised in the Episcopal Church. Interested in languages from an early age, he began learning Russian and Greek from the time he was 14.

At first, he did not see the connection between these languages and religion, but as he became more curious about Anglicanism, he came to believe that just as the Church of England had broken away from Rome, so in turn had the Roman Catholic Church originated as one of the Orthodox patriarchates but separated and made changes in its teachings.

From age 16, his curiosity about these things began to turn into a serious quest for the "true church". That year, he began immersing himself in everything he could read about Orthodox Christianity and discovered that one of his schoolmates, Dmitry Rimsky, was of Russian Orthodox background. Rimsky's father, Fyodor Rimsky, was a parishioner of the Synodal Cathedral of Our Lady of the Sign in Manhattan, and although he did not attend services too often, he recommended the Russian Orthodox Church Outside Russia to Shaw and promised to take him there the next time he went.

Then, on April 6, 1963 (which was Lazarus Saturday that year), Shaw made a visit to the chapel of St. Sergius in Southbury, Connecticut and met Dmitry Alexandrow (the future Bishop Daniel of Erie) who took him that evening to the Night Vigil service in New Kursk-Root Icon Hermitage, Mahopac, New York. That first experience of Orthodox worship made a lasting impression.

Shaw spent that summer in Greece, staying with the Yiannouzis family in a suburb of Athens and, surrounded there by the Orthodox Church, made a firm decision to embrace Orthodox Christianity as soon as possible.

After attending Russian Orthodox services for most of that year, Shaw was received into the Orthodox Church by chrismation on the day after he turned seventeen, December 22, 1963.

Rd. Dmitry Alexandrow was away from Southbury for some time, working with the newly arrived Old Believer Cossacks who had emigrated from Turkey, and John was received into the Orthodox Church by the Very Rev. Fr. Michael B. Draovitch, of Waterbury, Connecticut.

For a few months, John attended St. Mary's Russian Orthodox Church in Waterbury, Connecticut, but was soon involved again in ROCOR, and has remained a ROCOR member ever since.

After graduation from high school, Shaw studied at the University of Pittsburgh, majoring in Russian linguistics, with a minor in East European history. He graduated cum laude in 1968 and entered Holy Trinity Seminary in Jordanville, New York, where his classmates included the future Bishop Peter (Loukianoff) of Cleveland, Fr. Alexander Lebedeff, Fr. Stefan Pavlenko, Fr. Vitaly Kichakov, Bro. Adam Krotov and others. As a seminarian, Shaw's "obedience" was at the linotype. He was tonsured a reader on September 27, 1970, by Archbishop Averky.

After graduation from Jordanville in the class of 1971, Shaw served as a helper, translator, subdeacon and chauffeur to Archbishop Nikon (Rklitski) and, on the recommendation of his father-confessor, Archimandrite Cyprian (Pyzhov), was ordained to the subdiaconate, diaconate (April 11, 1976) and priesthood (April 25, 1976) by Archbishop Nikon. He was assigned to St. Vladimir Memorial Church, in Jackson, New Jersey.

On September 4, 1976, Archbishop Nikon suddenly died and Shaw was reassigned at the request of Archbishop Seraphim (Ivanov) to Holy Virgin Protection Cathedral in Chicago, Illinois where he served from November 1976 until March 1991. On the feast of the Ascension in 1984, Shaw was elevated to the rank of archpriest.

Then, when a priest was suddenly needed at Holy Trinity Church in Milwaukee, Wisconsin, Archbishop Alypy (Gramanovich) (who had succeeded Archbishop Seraphim) assigned Shaw to that parish, where he served from March 17, 1991, to November 30, 2008.

During that period, Shaw also translated two books from Russian into English: Vladyka Alypy's Slavonic textbook, which is now published in both Russian and English editions by Holy Trinity Monastery in Jordanville, and Monk Mitrophan's How Our Departed Ones Live, which was published in both languages by the efforts of Fr. Stefan Pavlenko and his parishioners in Burlingame, California.

Shaw was one of the delegates to the 4th All-Diaspora Sobor in 2006, and was a member of the delegation to Russia in 2007, for the restoration of communion between ROCOR and the Moscow Patriarchate.

On May 13, 2008, Shaw was asked by the newly elected Metropolitan Hilarion (Kapral) to serve as Bishop of Manhattan. After this On May 15, 2008, the Council of Bishops of the ROCOR decreed to send the curricula vitae of archimandrite George (Schaefer) and protopriest John Shaw along with accompanying appeals to Patriarch Alexy II of Moscow and All Russia for the confirmation of their candidacies for episcopal consecration. The Holy Synod of the Russian Orthodox Church confirmed their election (together with previously elected archimandrite Theodosius (Ivashchenko)) on June 23, 2008.

Shaw was tonsured a monk at Holy Trinity Monastery in Jordanville on December 5, 2008, by Bishop John (Bērziņš), and given the name Jerome in honor of Saint Jerome of Stridonium because of their common multi-lingual talents and translation efforts.

Shaw was elevated to the rank of an archimandrite by Bishop Peter (Loukianoff) of Cleveland on December 7, 2008, and consecrated Bishop of Manhattan on December 10, 2008, in the Synodal Cathedral of Our Lady of the Sign, on December 10 of the same year.

April 11, 2011, "in consideration of his diligent service ... and in connection with the 35th anniversary of entering the priesthood", Shaw was awarded a commemorative panagia.

On May 18, 2011, a vicariate was established for the parishes adhering to the Western rite. Shaw was appointed an assistant of the First Hierarch in management of these communities.

On July 10, 2013, an extraordinary session of the Synod of Bishops of ROCOR censured Shaw "for his willfulness in administering the parishes adhering to the Western Rite, and in performing various ecclesiastical services not approved by the Synod of Bishops, and for criticizing his brethren in letters to clergy and laity", relieved him of all duties, and retired him.

On September 16, 2022, by the decision of the Council of Bishops of the ROCOR he was included in the committee, created at the same time "to study the question of the canonical reception of former schismatics"

== Works ==
- Translator and editor, Liturgiia Apostola Marka: The Divine Liturgy of St. Mark (1997)
- Translator and editor, The Greco-Slavonic Liturgy of St. Peter the Apostle (2001)
- Translator of Monk Mitrophan, How Our Departed Ones Live, And How We Shall Live After Death (2005)
- Translator of Archbishop Alypy Gamanovich, Grammar of the Church Slavonic Language (Holy Trinity Monastery, Jordanville, NY, 2007) ISBN 978-0884650645
- Speech of Archimandrite Jerome (Shaw) At the Nomination Service On the Eve of His Consecration as Bishop of Manhattan, 2008
