= John Bērziņš =

Russian bishop

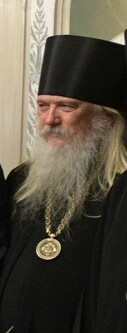
John Bērziņ

John Bērziņš (Russian: Епископ Иоанн, born Pēteris Bērziņš or Pyotr Leonodovich Berzin, Russian: Пётр Леонидович Берзинь; born 16 March 1956, Cooma, NSW, Australia) is bishop of Caracas and South America for the Russian Orthodox Church Outside of Russia (ROCOR) and head of the church's Old-Rite parishes.

== Life ==
Pēteris Bērziņš was born on 16 March 1957 in Cooma, Australia, of Latvian Orthodox refugees, Leonid (1921–1996) and Margarita (b. 1926) Bērziņš, who were forced to leave their homeland during the Second World War. He grew up in Cooma and graduated with a philological degree from the Australian National University. He was fluent in ancient Greek and Latin.

In 1982, he entered Holy Trinity Monastery in Jordanville, New York, and enrolled in Holy Trinity Seminary. He graduated from the seminary in 1985.

On 16 March 1985, he was tonsured to the mantle on by Archbishop Laurus (Škurla) of Syracuse and Holy Trinity. and on 12 April 1987 he was ordained hierodeacon also by Archbishop Laurus.

From 1992 to 1997, he served as father-confessor at Gethsemane Convent in the Holy Land.

In 1994, he was awarded the gold pectoral cross by Archbishop Laurus (Škurla).

From 2002 to 2005, he served again as father-confessor at Gethsemane Convent in the Holy Land.

On 5 September 2005, during the Celebrations of the 75th Anniversary of Holy Trinity Monastery he was elevated to the rank of hegumen by Metropolitan Laurus (Škurla).

From 2005 to 2008, he ministered to Ss. Sergius and German of Valaam Community of the Diocese of Chicago and Mid-America.

From May 7 to 20, 2008, the Council of Bishops of the ROCOR designated him as candidate for the South America diocese. On May 7/20, 2008, Council of Bishops of the ROCOR decreed to send the curriculum vitae of Hegumen John (Bērziņš ) along with a corresponding appeal to Patriarch Alexy II of Moscow and All Russia with the request to confirm his candidacy for episcopal consecration. Upon the confirmation of his candidacy by the Holy Synod of the Moscow Patriarchate, to determine the time and place of his consecration.

After consulting with the members of the Holy Synod of the Moscow Patriarchate, Patriarch of Moscow and All Russia confirmed the selection of Hegumen John on June 19.

Hegumen John was consecrated Bishop of Caracas on 21 June 2008, at the Old-Rite Church of the Nativity in Erie, Pennsylvania. Officiating at the consecration were Metropolitan Hilarion (Kapral) of New York and Eastern America, Bishop Daniel (Alexandrov) of Erie, and Bishop Peter (Loukianoff) of Cleveland.

On 26 October 2010, he was appointed head of the Old-Rite parishes of the ROCOR.

He speaks Russian, English, Latvian, Greek and Latin languages, and is studying the Argentine dialect of Spanish.

== Sources ==
- Bishop John of Caracas: Many Years!
- "The Caribbean Bishop" bishop John of Caracas and South America gives an interview to "Neskuchny sad"
- Bishop John of Caracas and South America: “My Chief Goal is to Heal Schism and Return the Flock to Our Churches”

This article incorporates text from John (Bērziņš) of Caracas at OrthodoxWiki which is licensed under the CC-BY-SA and GFDL.
