= St Peter and St Paul Russian Orthodox Cathedral =

- Cathedral of Saints Peter and Paul
- Русской Зарубежной Церкви
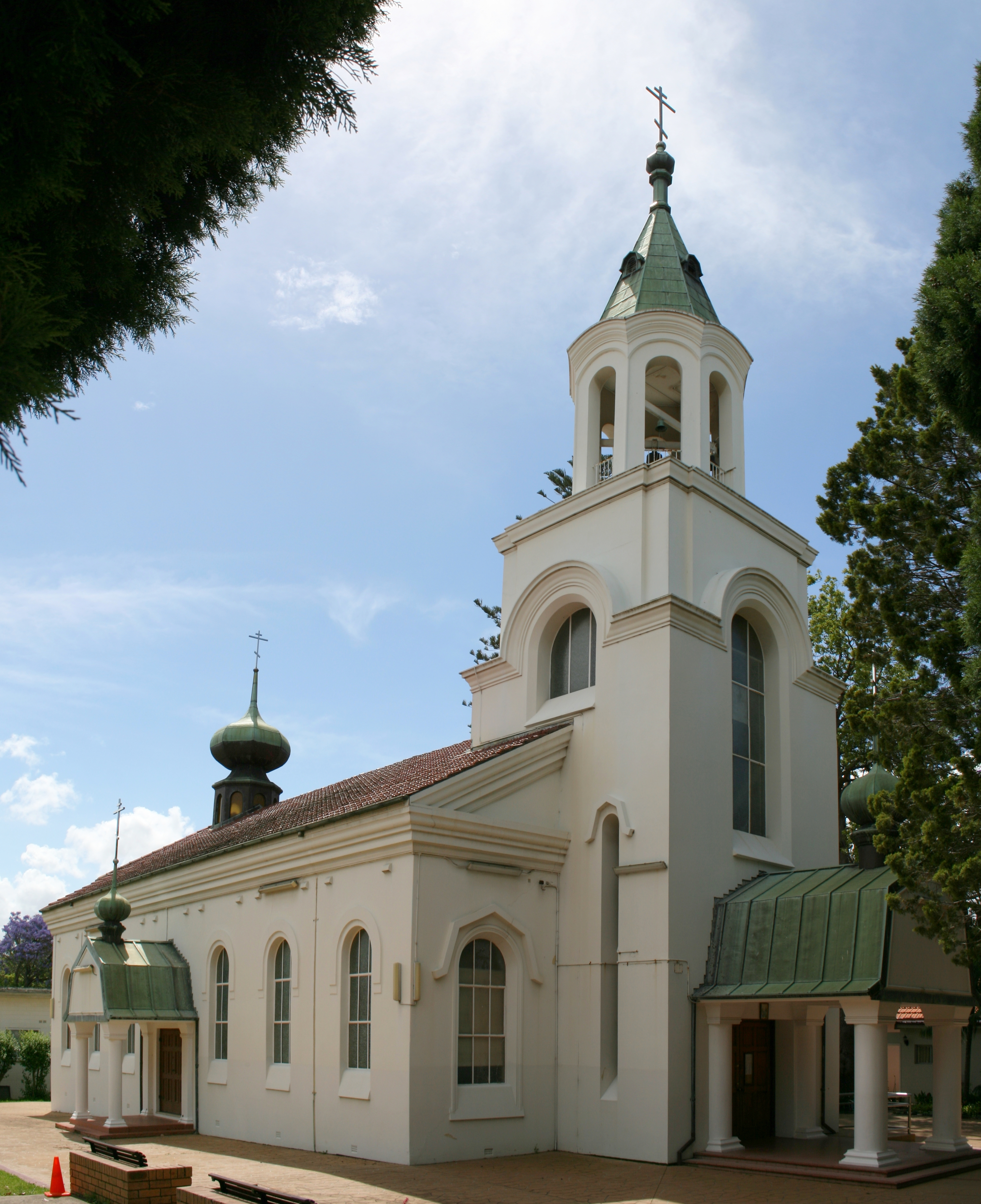
- Saints Peter and Paul Cathedral
- St Peter and St Paul Russian Orthodox Cathedral
- 33°52′30″S 151°05′20″E
- Address: 3–5 Vernon Street, Strathfield, Sydney, New South Wales
- Country: Australia
- Denomination: Russian Orthodox

History
- Status: Cathedral
- Founded: 7 October 1950
- Founder: Bishop Theodore Rafalsky
- Dedication: Saint Peter and Saint Paul
- Consecrated: 27 December 1953 by Bishop Theodore Rafalsky

Architecture
- Functional status: Completed
- Architectural type: Church
- Style: Russian religious
- Years built: 1951 – 1954
- Completed: 1988
- Construction cost: A£15,000

Administration
- Diocese: Australia and New Zealand
- Parish: Saints Peter and Paul Cathedral

Clergy
- Bishop: Bishop George Schaefer
- Priest: Fr Michael Storozhev

St Peter and St Paul Russian Orthodox Cathedral is a Russian Orthodox cathedral church at 3–5 Vernon Street, Strathfield, Sydney, New South Wales, Australia. The cathedral was built from 1951 to 1954. The cathedral is the seat for the Russian Orthodox Diocese of Australia since 1954, currently Bishop George Schaefer.

The cathedral is listed on the Strathfield Local Environmental Plan. The Royal Australian Institute of Architects has included the building on its list of Twentieth Century Significant Buildings.
