= Daniel Aleksandrov =

Daniel Aleksandrov may refer to:

- Daniel of Erie (1930–2010), American Russian Orthodox bishop
- Daniel Aleksandrov (wrestler) (born 1991), Bulgarian Greco-Roman wrestler
