= Diocese of Sydney =

Diocese of Sydney or Archdiocese of Sydney could refer to:

- Anglican Diocese of Sydney
- Roman Catholic Archdiocese of Sydney
- Russian Orthodox Diocese of Sydney, Australia and New Zealand
