= Skete of Prophet Elijah =

Cenobitic skete of Pantokratoros monastery in Mount Athos

- Σκήτη Προφήτη Ηλία
- Location within Mount Athos
- Interactive map of Skete of Prophet Elijah

Monastery information
- Order: Greek Orthodox

Site
- Location: Mount Athos; Greece
- Coordinates: 40°16′51.6″N 24°15′09.5″E
- Public access: Men only

The Skete of Prophet Elijah (Greek: Σκήτη Προφήτη Ηλία, Russian: Ильинский скит) is a cenobitic skete of Pantokratoros monastery in Mount Athos, Greece.

It was founded in 1759 by Paisius Velichkovsky, a Ukrainian monk from Poltava. Within the complex are a main church (built 1903) and three chapels. There are also an extensive library and two icons reputedly with miraculous powers.

The historic Holy Aqueduct (Greek: Υδατογέφυρο Στη Σκήτη Προφήτη Ηλία Παντοκράτορος) is located in the skete.

== Notable people ==
- George (Schaefer)
