= Kyrill Dmitrieff =

Russian Orthodox bishop (born 1954)

Archbishop Kyrill of San Francisco and Western America

Archbishop Kyrill (Russian: Архиепископ Кирилл, secular name Boris Mikhailovich Dmitriyev or Dmitrieff, Russian: Борис Михайлович Дмитриев; born 24 November 1954), is the ruling bishop of the Western American Diocese of the Russian Orthodox Church Outside Russia (ROCOR).

== Biography ==
He was born on 24 November 1954, in San Francisco, California, to ethnic Russian immigrant parents. At the age of 18, he was tonsured reader by Archbishop Anthony (Medvedev). In 1976 he graduated from University with a degree in theology. He then attended Saint Vladimir's Seminary, where he received his master's degree.

In 1981 he was tonsured a monk and ordained a hierodeacon and then a hieromonk by Metropolitan Philaret (Voznesensky). The same year he was appointed to the Russian Ecclesiastic Mission in Jerusalem as a teacher of Russian and English at the Bethany School. In 1982 he was transferred to the Western American diocese.

In 1987, he was appointed rector of the Ss Cyrill and Methodius Russian Church school at the Joy of all Who Sorrow Cathedral in San Francisco and was elevated to the rank of hegumen.

In 7 June 1992, he was consecrated bishop of Seattle, Vicar of the Western American Diocese.

After the repose of Archbishop Anthony in 2000, he was appointed ruling hierarch of the Western American Diocese.

In December 2003, he was elevated to the rank of archbishop.

In May 2004 he participated in the first official delegation of the Russian Orthodox Church Outside Russia to Russia, which opened the process of reconciliation with the Moscow Patriarchate.

On 19 May 2006, by the decision of the Council of Bishops of the Russian Orthodox Church Outside Russia, in connection with the retirement of Bishop Ambrose (Cantacuzène), he was appointed a member of the Commission for Negotiations with the Moscow Patriarchate.

== Honours ==
- Imperial Order of Saint Anna, 1st class (14 May 2013)
- 400th Anniversary Medal of the House of Romanov (14 May 2013)
