= Peter Loukianoff =

American Russian Orthodox prelate (1948–2024)

Archbishop Peter
- Archbishop of Chicago & Mid-America
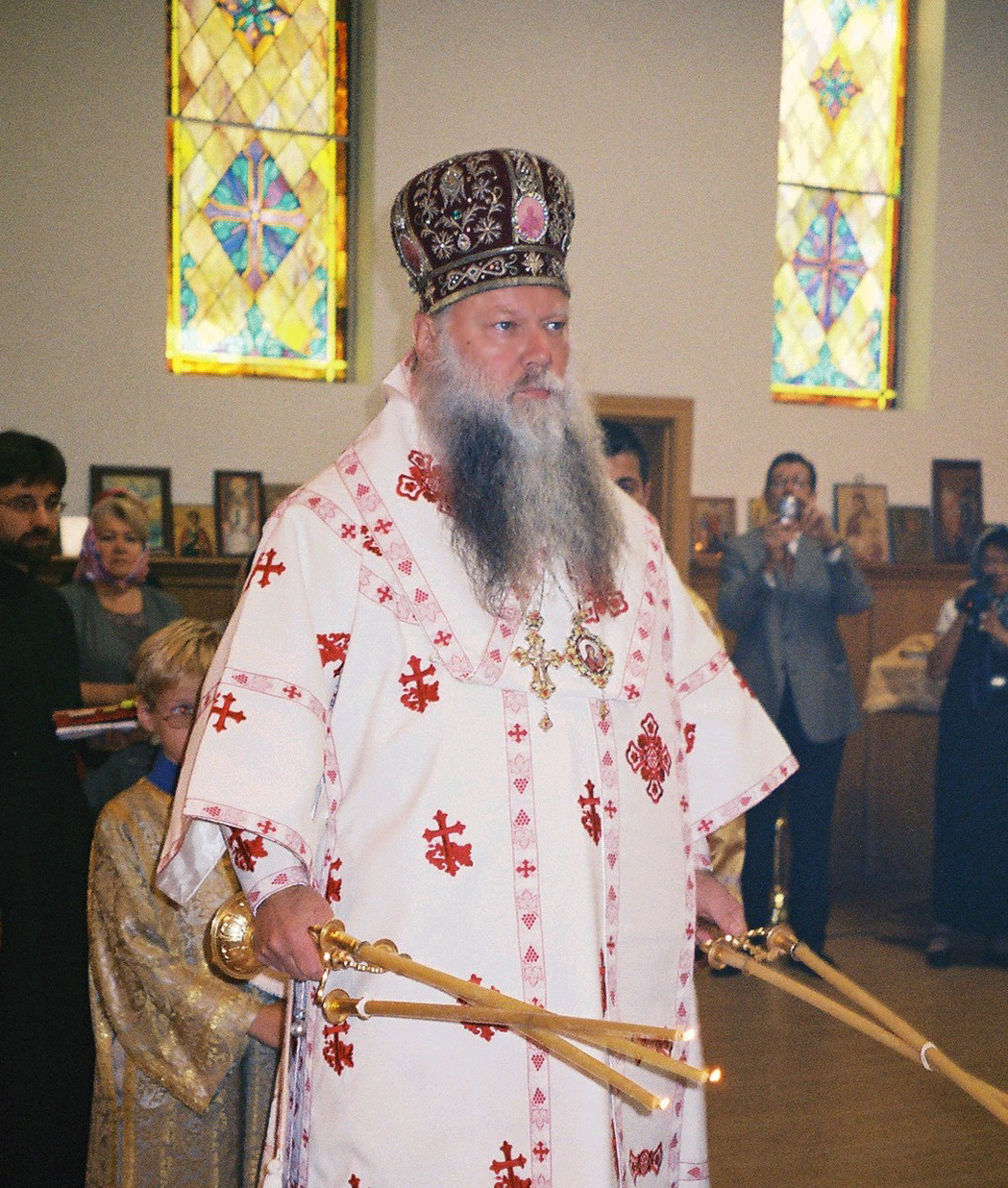
- Peter in 2007
- Native name: Архиепископ Пётр
- Elected: July 2, 2016
- Predecessor: Alypy (Gamanovich)
- Successor: Vacant

Personal details
- Born: Pavel Loukianoff; August 9, 1948 San Francisco, California, U.S.
- Died: November 8, 2024 (aged 76)
- Denomination: Russian Orthodoxy

Archbishop Peter (Russian: Архиепископ Петр, secular name Pavel Andreyevich Loukianoff, Russian: Павел Андреевич Лукьянов; August 9, 1948 – November 8, 2024) was an American bishop of the Russian Orthodox Church Outside of Russia, serving as archbishop of Chicago and Mid-America.

== Biography ==
Pavel Loukianoff was born in San Francisco, California, on August 9, 1948, into an ethnic Russian family of Don Cossack ancestry, who escaped to China after the Russian Revolution, and in the 1940s to the US after the Communist takeover.

There he studied at the Ss. Cyril and Methodius Russian Church gymnasia and school.

He served altar boy at the San Francisco cathedral to Archbishop Tikhon (Troitsky) and later Archbishop John (Maximovitch), with whom he served the last 3 years prior to St. John's death. On August 19, 1965, he was tonsured reader by St. John (Maximovitch) of San Francisco.

In September 1966 he enrolled in Holy Trinity Orthodox Seminary in Jordanville, New York, which he graduated in 1971 with a Bachelor of Theology degree. After completing seminary, he graduated from Norwich University and the department of theology of Belgrade university.

Between 1971 and 1976 he worked at the Synod of Bishops as an aide to bishop Laurus (Škurla) of Manhattan.

In 1988 he was tonsured a monk and ordained a hierodeacon by Archbishop Laurus on April 25, 1989, he was ordained a hieromonk. He then worked as an instructor of Church history and world history at Holy Trinity Seminary as well as holding the position of the seminary's inspector.

In 2000 he was appointed director of the Russian Ecclesiastic Mission in Jerusalem. In 2002 after Archbishop Alypy's accident, he was appointed administrator of the Diocese of Chicago and Detroit (now Chicago and Mid-America).

On May 12–14, 2003, the Synod of Bishops of the ROCOR decided that Archimandrite Peter (Loukianoff) would be a vicar bishop of the Chicago diocese with the title bishop of Cleveland.

July 12, 2003, the feast of the Holy Apostles Peter and Paul at the Protection of the Theotokos cathedral in Des Plaines, Illinois, his bishop nomination was held. Order was performed by Metropolitan Laurus assisted by Archbishop Alypy (Gamanovich) of Chicago and Detroit and bishop Kyrill (Dmitrieff) of San Francisco and Western America.

The next morning, at the Divine Liturgy, the bishop-elect presented his confession of faith and the consecration took place and was performed by the same bishops. Present at the Liturgy were Archbishop Job (Osacky) of Chicago and the Midwest (OCA) and representatives of other local churches. Also present was Her Royal Highness Princess Maria Louisa, sister of King Simeon of Bulgaria with representatives of the Bulgarian Royal house, which was commemorated at the Great Entrance.

In 2008, Bp. Peter became a permanent member of the Synod of Bishops. In September 2009, he was appointed Treasurer of the Synod of Bishops.

July 2, 2016, on the retirement of Abp Alypy, Bishop Peter was appointed to the Diocese of Chicago and Mid-America and elevated to the rank of Archbishop.

June 13, 2017, Archbishop Peter was awarded the right to wear the jeweled cross on his klobuk by the Council of Bishops for his "many years of sincere service to the Holy Church".

Archbishop Peter died suddenly on November 8, 2024, at the age of 76.
