= Gabriel Chemodakov =

Australian bishop (born 1961)

His Eminence Gabriel
- Archbishop of Montreal and Canada, Locum-Tenens of the Diocese of Chicago and Mid-America
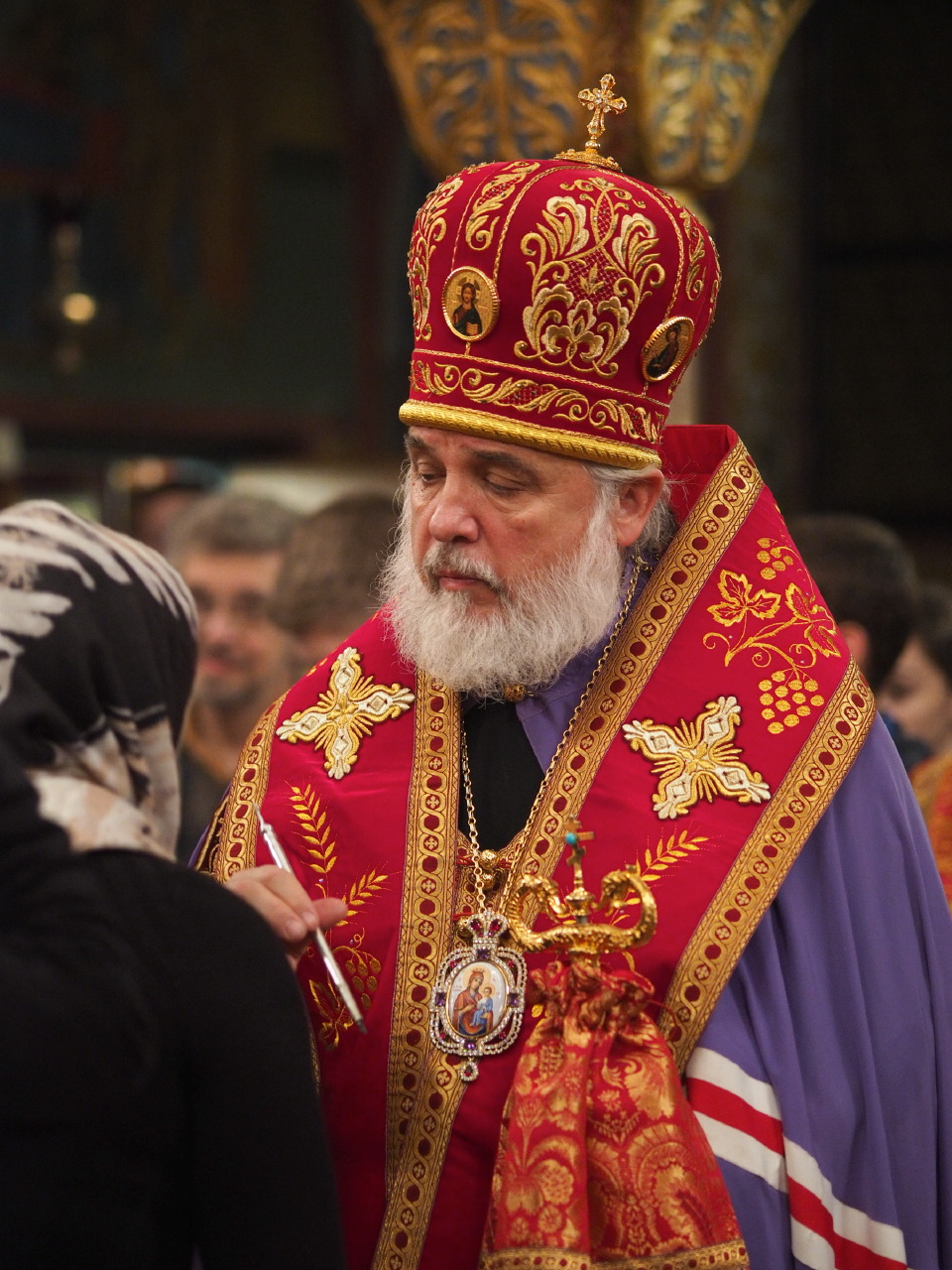
- Church: Russian Orthodox Church Outside of Russia
- Diocese: Diocese of Montreal and Canada

Personal details
- Born: June 2, 1961 (age 65) Sydney, Australia
- Denomination: Russian Orthodoxy
- Education: Holy Trinity Orthodox Seminary

Archbishop Gabriel (Russian: Архиепископ Гавриил, secular name George Lvovich Chemodakov, Russian: Георгий Львович Чемодаков) was born on June 2, 1961 in Sydney, Australia. He is a bishop in the Russian Orthodox Church Outside Russia, with the title of Archbishop of Montreal and Canada.

== Biography ==
In his childhood, George was greatly influenced by the Saintly Parish Protopresbyter Rostislav Gan. While George was still young, Fr. Rostislav passed away. However, upon the return of his older brother Nikita (now a priest in the Diocese of Sydney, Australia and New Zealand), he continued to receive gentle encouragement to attend Holy Trinity Orthodox Seminary in Jordanville, New York.

In 1980 he entered Holy Trinity Orthodox Seminary in Jordanville, from which he graduated in 1984 and where he remained as an instructor of Russian culture and other subjects through 1989.

In 1989 he was appointed cell attendant to Metropolitan Vitaly (Ustinov) and then to Bishop Hilarion (Kapral) of Manhattan, then vicar of Eastern American diocese. He continued in this obedience until 1996.

In January 1996 at the meeting of the Synod of Bishops of ROCOR, Metropolitan Vitaly raised the issue of appointing a permanent prelate to govern the ROCOR Diocese of Australia and New Zealand. Metropolitan Vitaly recommended that Bishop Hilarion (Kapral) of Washington, be sent to Australia and that George Chemodakov, an unmarried lay worker at the Synod and a graduated seminarian, be tonsured to the monastic state and consecrated auxiliary bishop of Brisbane. George always wanted to become a priest and never succeeded at founding a family, therefore he accepted this new path.

In March 1996, George Chemodakov was tonsured a monk with name Gabriel, in honour of his great-grandfather Gavriil Luchinin, a priest from Vyatka.

On the Fifth Sunday of Great Lent of 1996, he was ordained to the rank of hierodeacon by Archbishop Laurus (Škurla) of Syracuse. In the same year, on the feast of the Palm Sunday, he was ordained hieromonk by Metropolitan Vitaly (Ustinov).

On 7 July 1996, at the Holy Trinity Monastery in Jordanville, New York, he was consecrated bishop of Brisbane, vicar of the Australian and New Zealand Diocese. The consecration was performed by Metropolitan Vitaly (Ustinov), Archbishop Anthony (Medvedev) of San Francisco and Western America, Archbishop Laurus (Škurla) of Syracuse, Bishop Hilarion (Kapral) of Manhattan, Archbishop Chrysostomos of Etna and Bishop Auxentios of Photiki of the Church of the Genuine Orthodox Christians of Greece (Old Calendar Synod in Resistance).

On October 6, of same year, he was appointed vicar of Eastern American Diocese with the title of Bishop of Manhattan and Deputy Secretary of the Synod of Bishops of ROCOR.

In October 2001, he was appointed Secretary of the Synod of Bishops of ROCOR.

In January 2005, he was appointed as a member of the Commission for the Conducting of the Fourth All-Diaspora Council.

On May 13, 2008, Bishop Gabriel was appointed Bishop of Montreal and Canada by Decree of the Council of Bishops of ROCOR. Obtaining this title, Bishop Gabriel also became rector of Saint Nicholas Cathedral in Montreal and Honorary Director of Alexander Pushkin parish school in Montreal.

In May 2011, at the wish of the First Hierarch, Metropolitan Hilarion, Bishop Gabriel was elevated to the rank of archbishop.

During a regular meeting in June 2016, the Synod of Bishops of the ROCOR appointed Archbishop Gabriel as a member of the Board of Trustees of the Holy Trinity Orthodox Seminary, representing the Synod of Bishops on the Board.

When the Covid-19 pandemic started, although still retaining the title Archbishop of Montreal and Canada, Archbishop Gabriel did not enter Canada or visit his diocese from the moment pandemic border restrictions were applied by Canadian authorities (from February 2020 to November 2022). He spent most of his time in the United States during that time.

== Views on the 2022 invasion of Ukraine ==
Following the Russian invasion of Ukraine on 24 February, Archbishop George disseminated an appeal through his clergy. The appeal justified the invasion of Ukraine on the basis of claims of genocide against ethnic Russians in the Donbas by "Kievan Fascists". The appeal was deleted from the Diocesan website following backlash from the Quebec media.

== Sources ==
- Bishop Gabriel (Chemodakov), ROCOR(L): "For most of our flock, it is unclear why we suddenly have a different position toward the Moscow Patriarchate."
