= Russian Orthodox Diocese of Sydney, Australia and New Zealand =

The Diocese of Sydney, Australia and New Zealand (Russian: Сиднейская и Австралийско-Новозеландская епархия, also Australian and New Zealand Diocese) is the diocese of the Russian Orthodox Church Outside Russia in Australia and New Zealand headquartered in Sydney.

== History ==
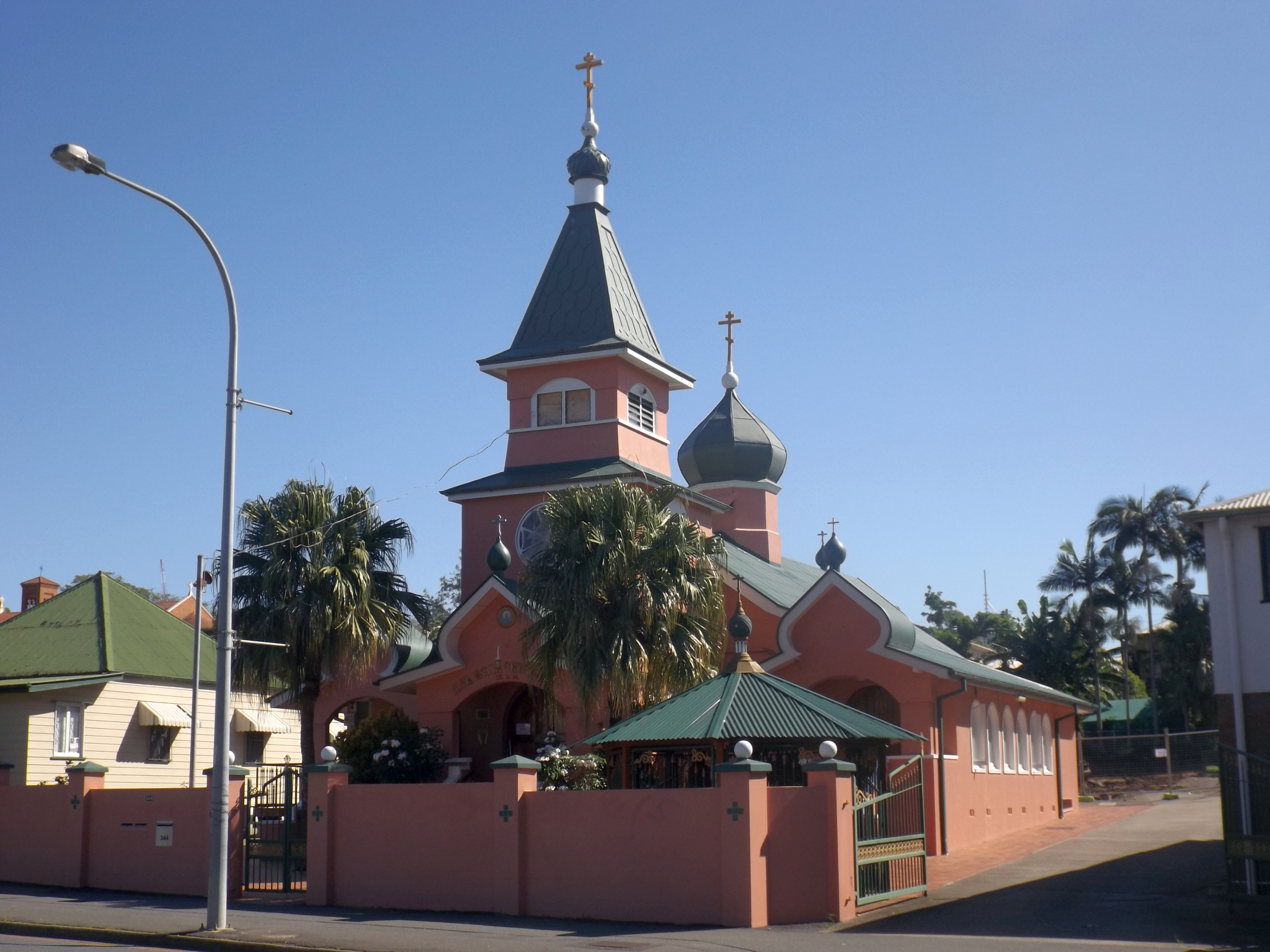
St Nicholas Cathedral, Brisbane, 2015

The first Russian Orthodox parish in Australia was St Nicholas Church (now St Nicholas Russian Orthodox Cathedral) founded in 1926 in Brisbane.

The Australian diocese of the ROCOR was founded in 1946 with episcopal see at St Nicholas Church in Brisbane.

In 1950, the episcopal see was moved to Sydney to the Saints Peter and Paul Cathedral.

In 1994, the Korean Orthodox mission was subordinated to Australian and New Zealand diocese by decree of the Synod of Bishops.

In February 2005, the diocese included parishes of Indonesia that are of Old Calendar or independent Churches.

In 2012, a Pakistan mission was established.

In 2015, Archbishop George (then vicar-bishop) joined other religious leaders in writing a letter to the then Australian Prime Minister Tony Abbott opposing the bills allowing same-sex marriage.

In 2023, a session of the Synod of Bishops of the Russian Orthodox Church Outside of Russia heard the Synod's President's petition to elevate Bishop George of Sydney, Australia and New Zealand to the rank of Archbishop. On July 12, 2024, Metropolitan Nicholas elevated his rank officially, at Sts Peter and Paul Diocesan Cathedral in Sydney.

== List of hierarchs ==
=== Diocesan bishops ===
- Theodore (Rafalsky) (December 12, 1946 - May 5, 1955)
- Sabbas (Raevsky) (1955 - September 5, 1969)
- Athanasius (Martos) (5 September 1969 - 23 July 1970)
- Sabbas (Raevsky) (July 23 - November 25, 1970) locum tenens
- Theodosius (Putilin) (November 25, 1970 - August 13, 1980)
- Paul (Pavlov) (August 1980 – 1992)
- Daniel (Alexandrov) (March 18, 1992 - 1994) locum tenens
- Alypius (Gamanovich) (April 7 - May 1994)
- Barnabas (Prokofiev) (11 January - September 1995)
- Hilarion (Kapral) (June 20, 1996 - 16 May 2022)
- George (Schaefer) (since 17 May 2022)

=== Vicar bishops ===
==== Bishops of Brisbane ====
- Athanasius (Martos) (5 September 1950 - 17 October 1953)
- Philaret (Voznesensky) (May 26, 1963 - May 27, 1964)
- Constantine (Essensky) (December 10, 1967 - September 1974)
- Gabriel (Chemodakov) (July 7 - October 6, 1996)

==== Bishops of Melbourne ====
- Athanasius (Martos) (December 22, 1949 - September 5, 1950; October 1953)
- Sabbas (Raevsky) (18 January 1954 - May 1955)
- Anthony (Medvedev) (November 16, 1956 - 1968)
- Theodosius (Putilin) (29 November 1969 - 25 November 1970)

==== Bishops of Canberra ====
- George (Schaefer) (October 7, 2014 - September 21, 2022)

== Parishes and Monasteries ==
=== Australia ===
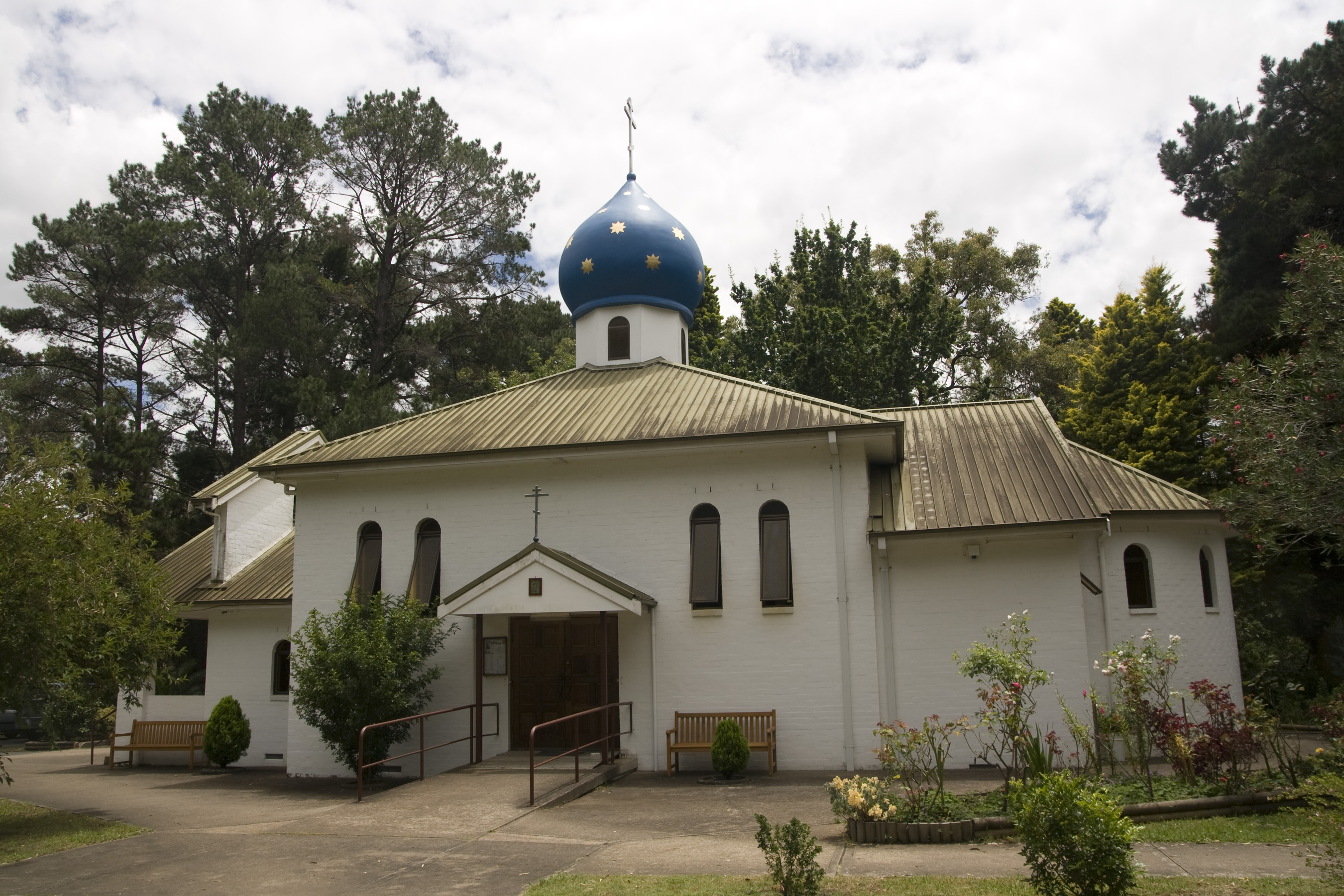
Our Lady of Kazan Convent, Kentlyn

==== New South Wales ====
- Saints Peter and Paul Diocesan Cathedral, Strathfield
- Archangel Michael Church, Blacktown
- Church of All Russian Saints, Croydon
- Holy Dormition Church, Wollongong
- Holy Transfiguration Monastery, Bombala
- Our Lady of Kazan Convent, Kentlyn
- St John the Baptist Skete, Kentlyn, New South Wales
- Orthodox Monastery of the Archangel Michael, Marrickville
- Presentation of the Mother of God Convent, Bungarby
- Protection of the Holy Virgin "Pokrov" Church, Cabramatta
- St George Church, Carlton
- St Nicholas Church, Fairfield
- St Nicholas Church, Wallsend
- St Panteleimon Church, West Gosford
- St Vladimir Church, Centennial Park

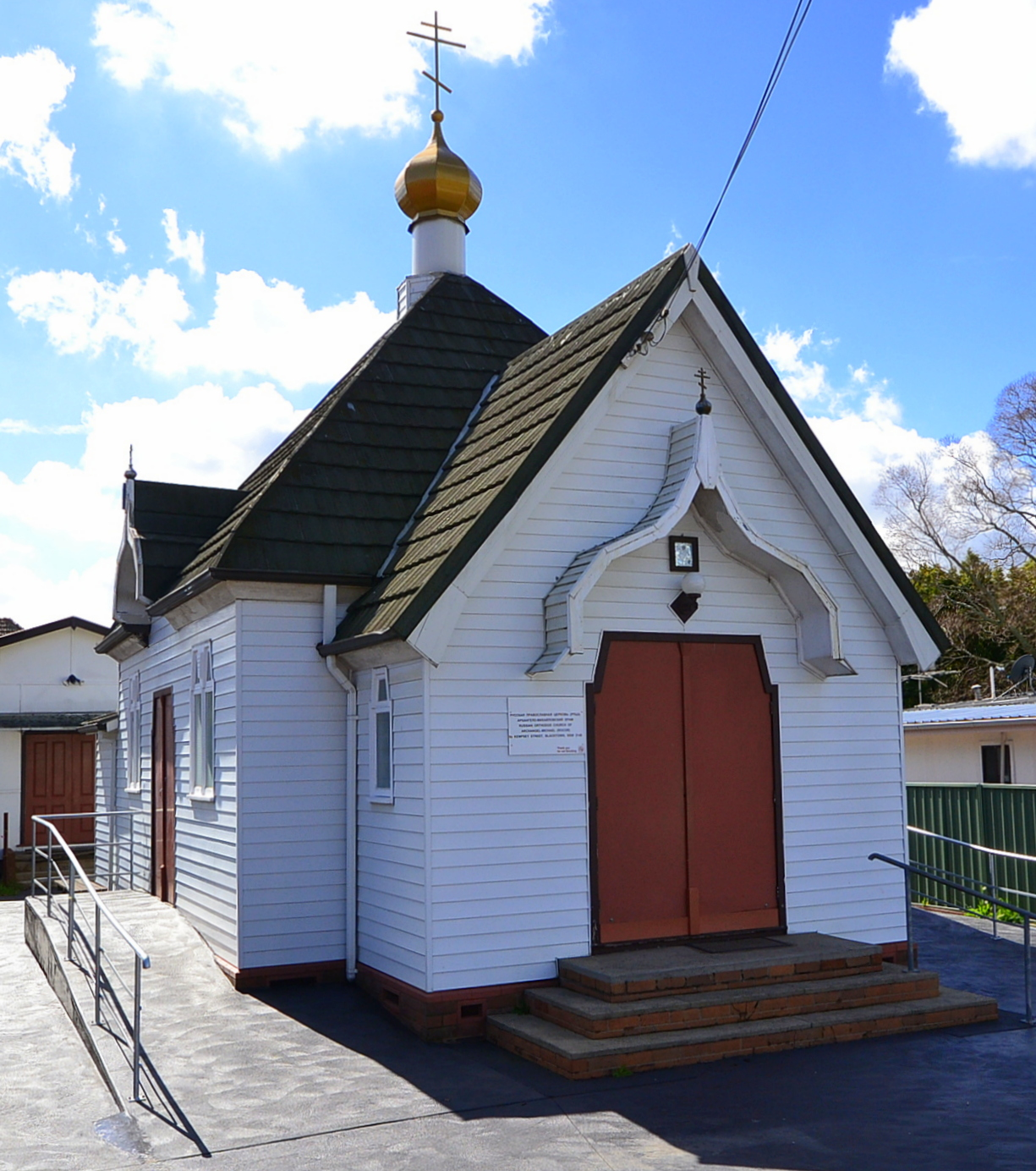
Archangel Michael Church, Blacktown NSW

==== Victoria ====
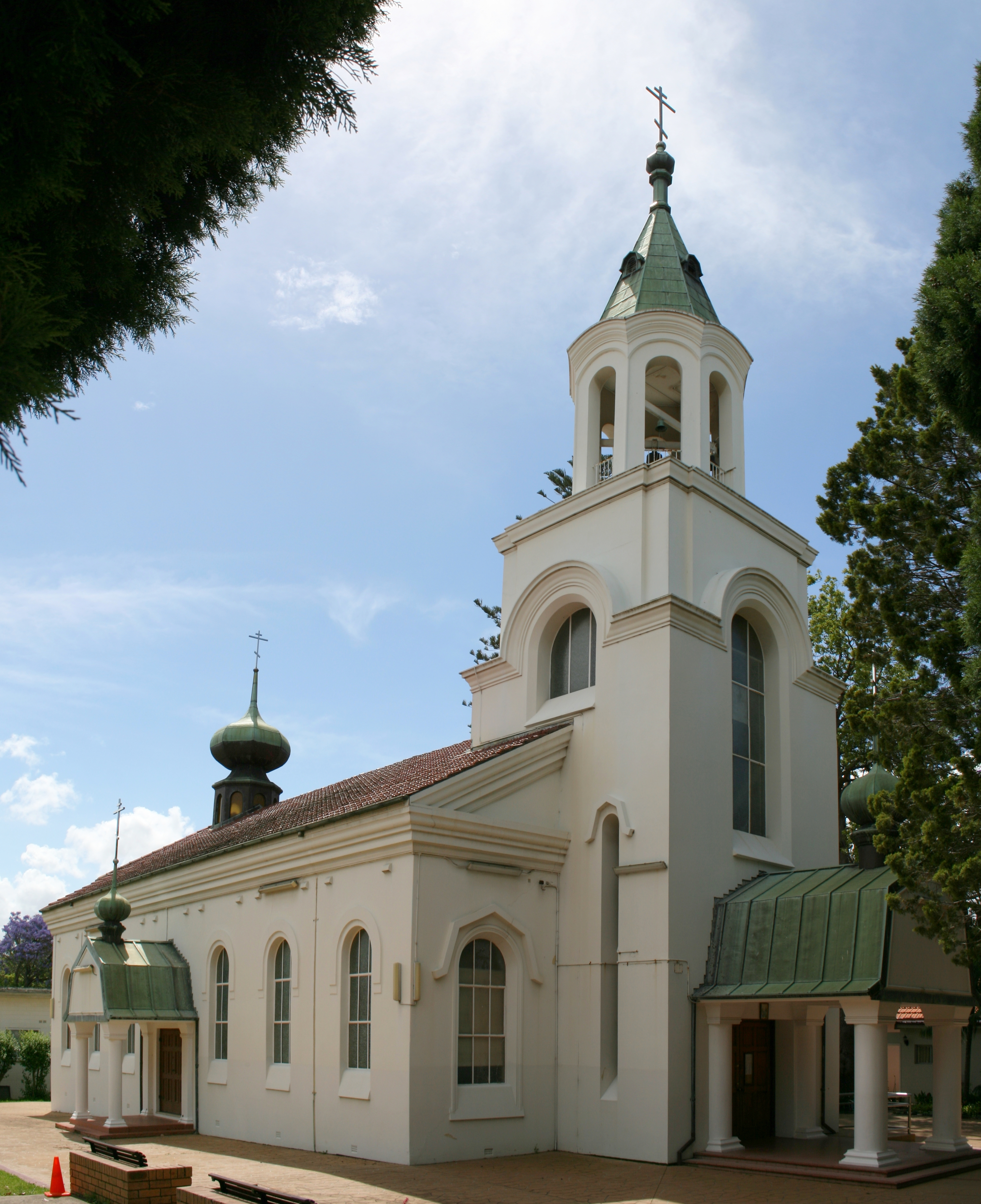
Saints Peter and Paul Diocesan Cathedral, Sydney

- Protection of the Holy Virgin "Pokrov" Cathedral, Brunswick East
- Church the Icon of Our Lady "Joy of All Who Sorrow", "Bell Park (Geelong)
- Church of Our Lady's Dormition, Dandenong
- Holy Ascension Orthodox Mission, Williamstown
- Holy Fathers Community, Allansford (Warrnambool)
- St John of Kronstadt Chapel, Dandenong

==== Queensland ====
- St Nicholas Cathedral, Brisbane
- Orthodox Church of the Holy Annunciation, Woolloongabba
- Our Lady of Vladimir Church, Rocklea
- St Xenia Church, Tweed Heads (New South Wales)
- St Seraphim Church, Woolloongabba

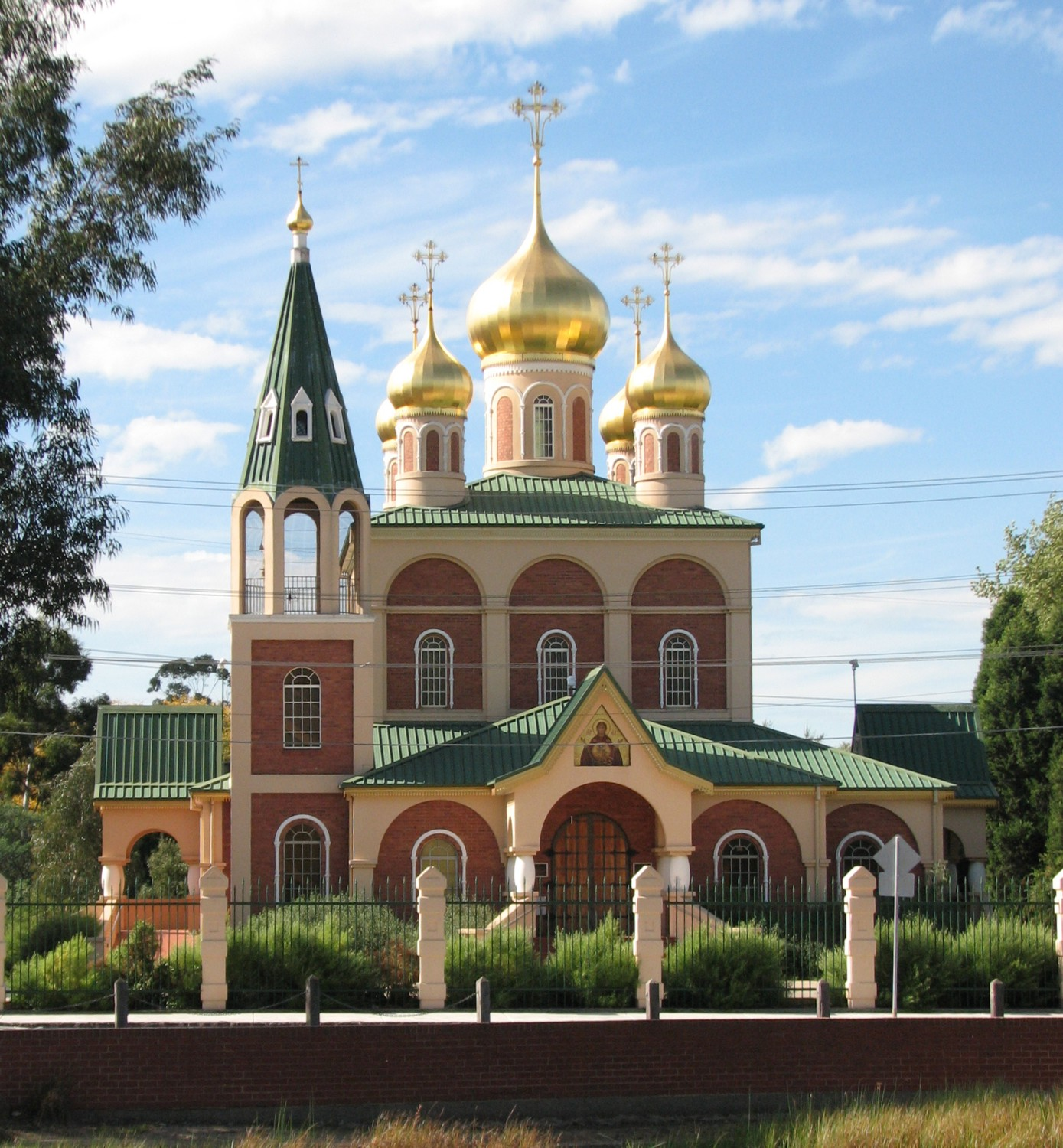
Pokrov Cathedral, Brunswick East

==== Tasmania ====
- Exaltation of the Holy Cross Church, Hobart
- Holy Trinity Church, Hobart

===== South Australia =====
- Monastery of the Prophet Elias, Monarto South
- St Nicholas Church, Wayville

==== Australian Capital Territory ====
- St John the Forerunner Church, Canberra

==== Western Australia ====
- Sts Peter and Paul Church, Bayswater

=== New Zealand ===
- Christ the Saviour Church, Wellington
- Resurrection of Christ Church, Auckland
- St Nicholas Church, Christchurch

=== Korea ===
- Korean Orthodox Mission, Gangnam
- Hermitage of Saint Anne, Kangwon-do

=== Philippines ===
- St. John Maximovitch Orthodox Mission, Davao del Sur
- St. Nikolai Orthodox Community, Manila
- Church of St. Nikolai of Zicha, Leyte
- Mission of the Iveron Icon of the Mother of God, Samar

=== Pakistan ===
- St. Michael the Archangel Orthodox Mission, Sargodha

== Educational institutions ==
=== St John of Kronstadt Academy, Brisbane ===
St John of Kronstadt Academy is a classical Pan-Orthodox school in Brisbane, Queensland, currently headed by Father Stephen David, a priest at Holy Annunciation Orthodox Church in Brisbane. As of 2025, it can accommodate up to 60 students from years Prep to 4. Archbishop George blessed the opening of the school in 2024, the Academy's opening educational year.

=== Sts Cyril and Methodius Orthodox Institute, Dandenong ===
Abbreviated as SCMOI, Sts Cyril and Methodius Orthodox Institute is the sole tertiary educational institute of the ROCOR Diocese of Australia and New Zealand. It serves to educate lay Christians, and potientally equip future Orthodox clergy for their life. Archbishop George is the chairman, successor of Founding Chairman, Metropolitan Hilarion. Father Peter Hill, an archpriest who serves at the Church of Our Lady's Dormition, is the Principal of the Institute.

== See also ==
- Russian Orthodox Church Outside of Russia
- George Schaefer (bishop)
- Assembly of Canonical Orthodox Bishops of Australia, New Zealand, and Oceania
