= Holy Cross Monastery (Wayne, West Virginia) =

Russian Orthodox monastery in Wayne, West Virginia

Coordinates: 38.2267°N 82.3586°W

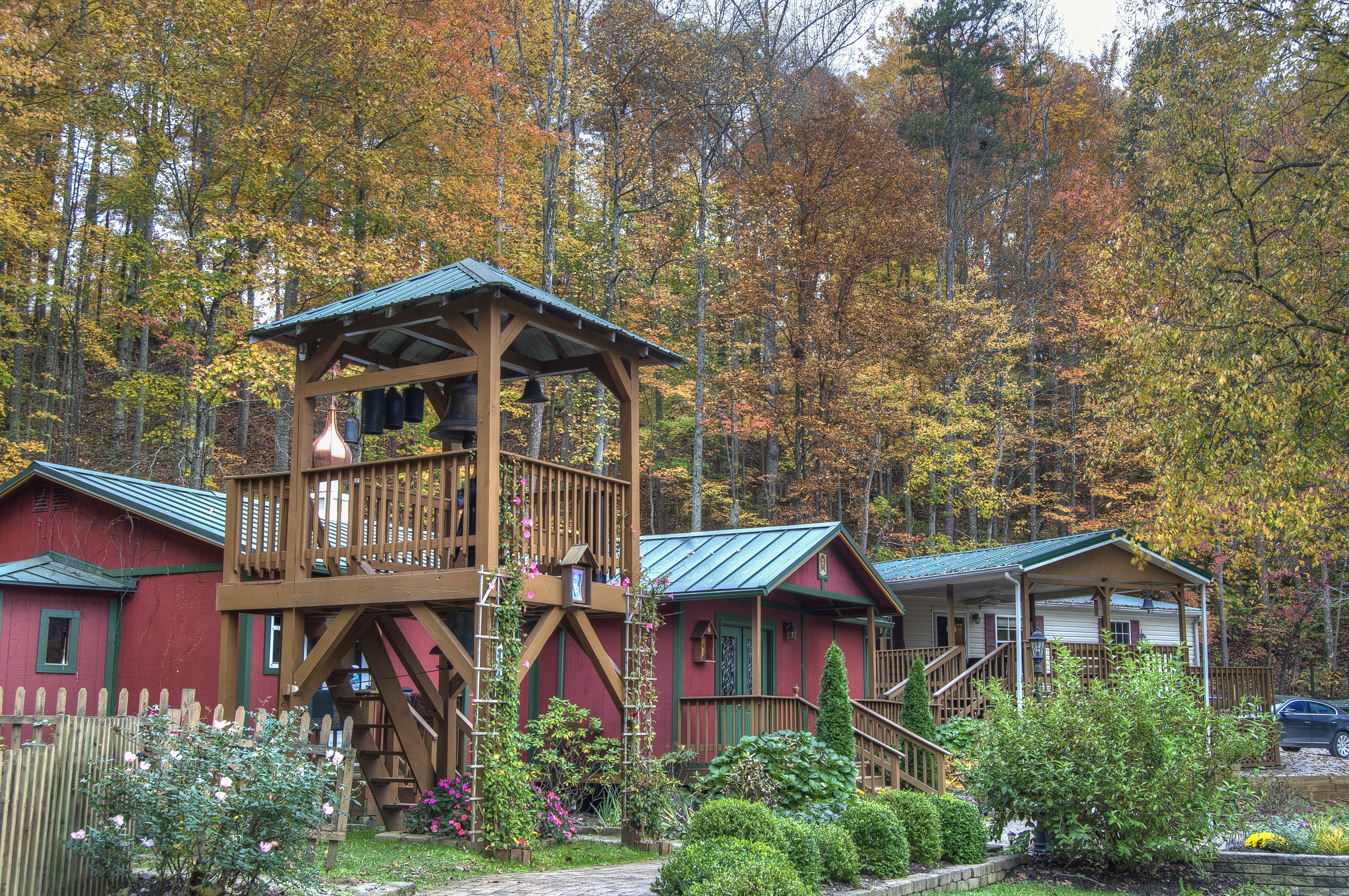
The main chapel and bell tower of the monastery.

Holy Cross Monastery (Russian: Крестовоздвиженский монастырь) is an English-speaking men's monastery in Wayne, West Virginia under the jurisdiction of the Russian Orthodox Church Outside Russia in the Diocese of Eastern America & New York. The abbot and confessor of the monastery is Igumen Gabriel.

Holy Cross is a growing monastery consisting of more than two dozen monks, novices and candidates living a traditional monastic life of prayer and manual labor. There are 25 monastics in the brotherhood as of October, 2017, as well as several candidates and lay workers.

== History ==
Holy Cross Monastery was founded in September 1986 by Hieromonk Kallistos (Pazalos) in House Springs, Missouri with the blessing of Archbishop Alypy (Gramanovich) of Chicago (ROCOR).

Following the death of Hieromonk Kallistos in 1992, the monastery went under the spiritual guidance of the Holy Trinity Monastery in Jordanville, New York.

In 1999, brotherhood had doubled in size since founding, filling all cells of the monastery. At the time the monastery could not expand due to surrounding city development. In the summer of same year the continued growth of the surrounding city solved its own problem for the monastery, as the civil authorities required the building of a major highway through the monastery. An alternate piece of land in West Virginia was offered to the community.

On May 25, 2000, the monastery moved to Wayne, West Virginia.

On December 7, 2008, the monastery's spiritual father Archimandrite George was consecrated auxiliary bishop of Mayfield with his cathedra at Mayfield. In May 2009, Holy Cross received its independence from Holy Trinity Monastery, and Bishop George was elected as the abbot.

On April 13, 2015 Bishop George (Schaefer) of Mayfield was reassigned to Canberra in the Diocese of Australia & New Zealand. Before his departure, Bishop George elevated Igumen Seraphim (Voepel) to the rank of Archimandrite and installed him as the abbot of Holy Cross.

In 2025, following Archimandrite Seraphim's declining health, he was tonsured into the Great Schema as Schema-Archimandrite Panteleimon on Holy Monday and reposed on Bright Friday. The brotherhood elected Igumen Gabriel (Hooten) as its new abbot.

== New Church ==
In addition to the growing brotherhood and several new residential buildings, as of 2025 the monastery is constructing a larger main sanctuary, bell tower, and refectory, designed by architect Andrew Gould.
