= Hilarion Kapral =

Russian Orthodox bishop (1948–2022)

His Eminence, The Most Reverend Metropolitan Hilarion
- Metropolitan of Eastern America and New York; First Hierarch of the Russian Orthodox Church Outside of Russia,
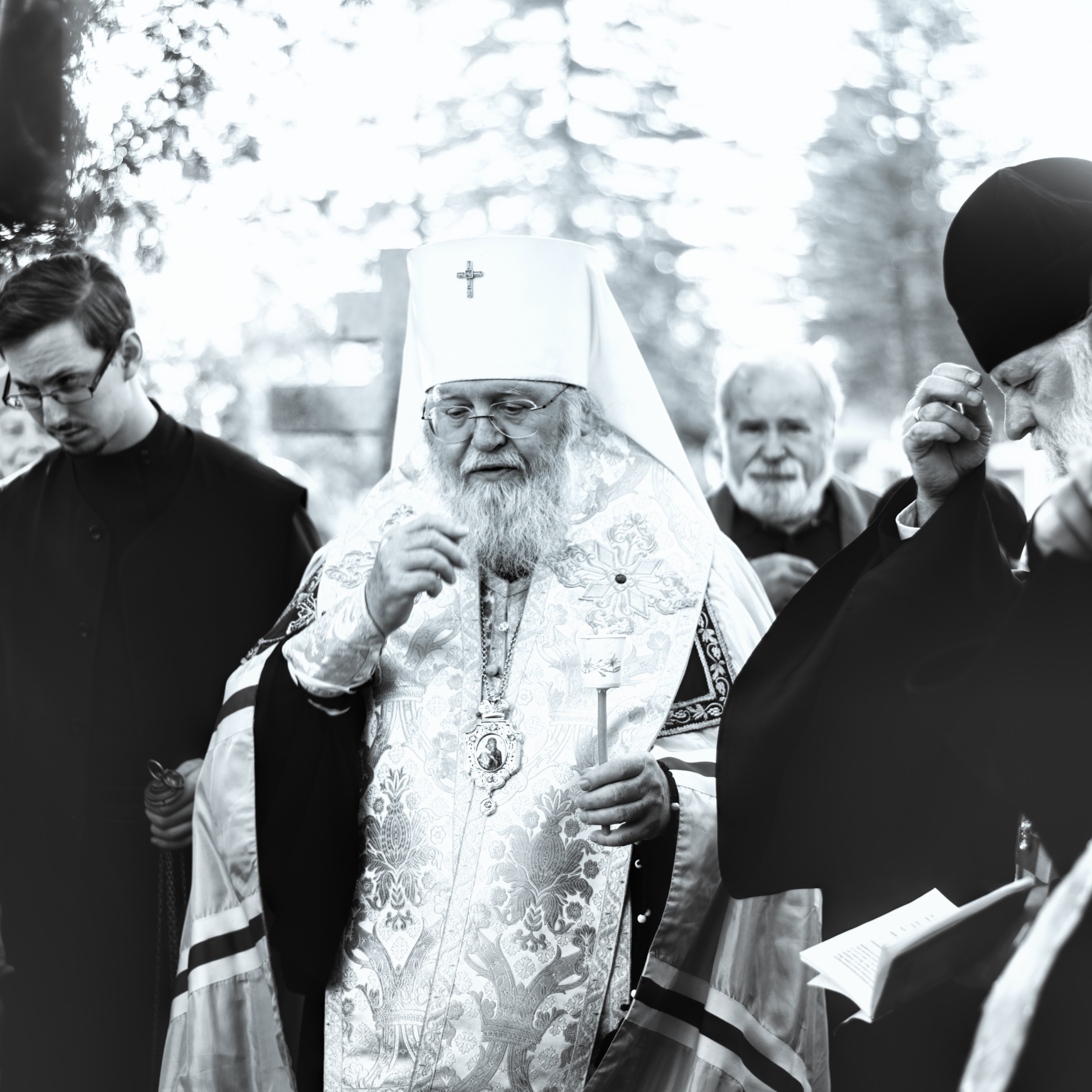
- Metropolitan Hilarion in 2010
- Church: Russian Orthodox Church Outside Russia
- See: Eastern American & New York Diocese (Note: Hilarion also oversaw the Australian and New Zealand Diocese (locum tenens), and the Diocese of Great Britain and Ireland (locum tenens))
- Appointed: 12 May 2008
- Term ended: 16 May 2022
- Predecessor: Laurus (Škurla)
- Successor: Nicholas (Olhovsky)

Orders
- Ordination: 10 April 1976 by Laurus (Škurla)
- Consecration: 10 December 1984 by Philaret (Voznesensky)

Personal details
- Born: Igor Alexeyevich Kapral; 6 January 1948 Spirit River, Alberta, Canada
- Died: 16 May 2022 (aged 74) New York City, U.S.

Metropolitan Hilarion (born Igor Alexeyevich Kapral, Russian: Игорь Алексеевич Капра́л; 6 January 1948 – 16 May 2022) was a bishop of the Russian Orthodox Church Outside Russia (ROCOR), Metropolitan of Eastern America and New York, First-Hierarch of the ROCOR from 18 May 2008 until his death; as the first person elected to that position following the Act of Canonical Communion between the ROCOR and the Russian Orthodox Church, he was the first whose election required approval by the Holy Synod of the Moscow Patriarchate.

On 17 May 2007, upon the signing of the Act of Canonical Communion between the ROCOR and the Russian Orthodox Church (Moscow Patriarchate), Kapral became a part of the episcopate of the Moscow Patriarchate.

== Biography ==
=== Early years ===
The youngest child of Alexei and Euphrosynia Kapral, Ukrainian immigrants, Igor Kapral was born on 6 January 1948 in Spirit River, Alberta, Canada. He spoke Ukrainian at home and English at school. He spent a childhood he described as having been "pleasant ... absolutely free of any harmful influences", walking two and a half miles to school each day. (Later, Kapral transferred to a school in Blueberry Creek, but he returned to finish high school.)

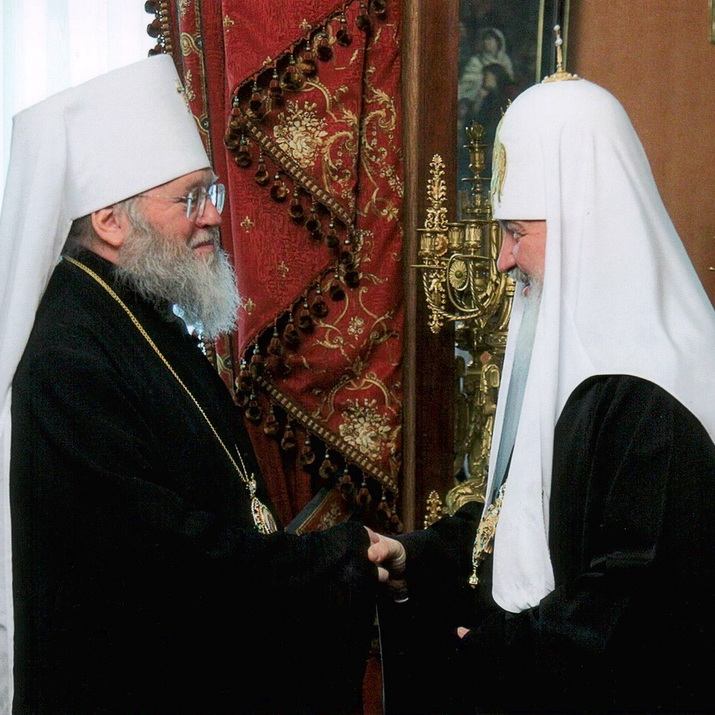
Metropolitan Hilarion (left) meeting Patriarch Kirill in Moscow, 30 September 2010

From his youth, Kapral felt drawn to the Church and loved to read books and periodicals on religion and morals. From a young age, around 6 or 7, he knew that he wanted to become a priest. He attended Holy Trinity Church in Spirit River, a congregation of the ROCOR composed of ethnic Ukrainians. Services were held monthly or bi-monthly, and often Archbishop Panteleimon (Rudyk) would celebrate these services. Igor revered Archbishop Panteleimon, who told the boy, "someday you will be a priest".

=== Seminary, priesthood ===
In 1966, Kapral found a spiritual guide: Right Reverend Sava (Saračević), Bishop of Edmonton, a Serb who greatly revered John of Shanghai and San Francisco. In 1967, Kapral entered Holy Trinity Orthodox Seminary in Jordanville, New York. While there, he learned the Russian language, sang on the kliros, and served in the altar, learning the order of divine services. From his second year at seminary, Kapral was tasked with typesetting "Orthodox Life" in English, under the editorship of archimandrite Constantine Zaitsev; Igor soon succeeded him as editor. After some time, hieromonk Ignatius (Trepatschko), who was in charge of printing the journal, asked Kapral to typeset it in Russian as well.

Upon graduation from the seminary in 1972, Kapral entered the Holy Trinity Monastery as a novice. On 2 December 1974, he was tonsured a rassophore monk with the name Hilarion, in honor of Venerable Schema-monk Hilarion of the Kiev Caves and subsequently was tonsured into the little schema. On 4 December 1975, Archbishop Averky Taushev, for whom Hilarion served as a cell-attendant, ordained him a hierodeacon and on Lazarus Saturday 1976 Bishop Laurus of Manhattan ordained him a hieromonk. Hilarion served as a hieromonk at the monastery, continuing his work at the printing press. He was often sent to parishes, replacing absent priests, often traveling to Cleveland and Pennsylvania.

=== Bishop ===
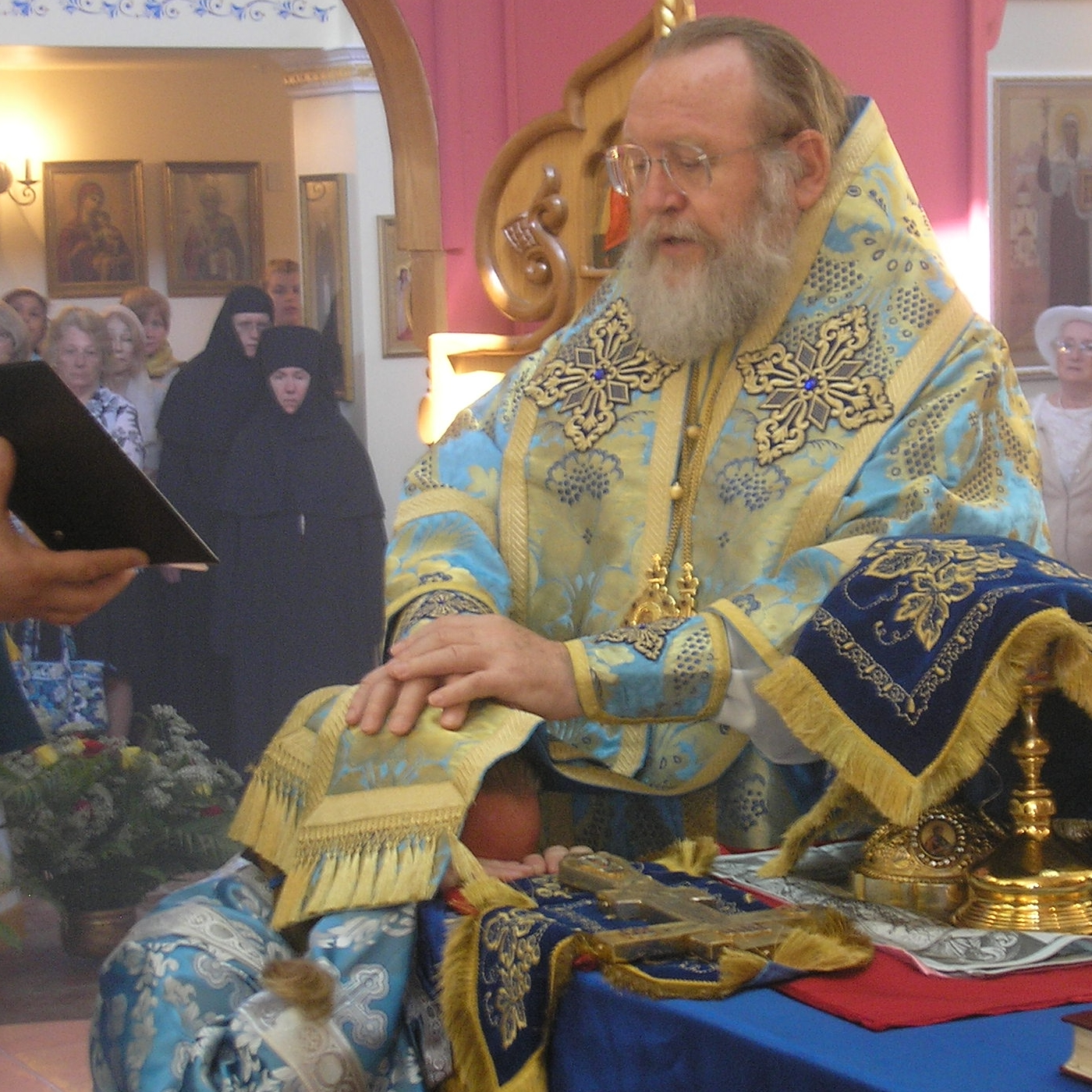
Metropolitan Hilarion ordaining a presbyter by cheirotonia, 2010.

On 10 December 1984, Hilarion was consecrated a bishop by Metropolitan of New York Philaret and nine other bishops and appointed to the see of Manhattan, charged with overseeing parishes in Pennsylvania; in the Synod of Bishops, Hilarion served as deputy secretary. In 1995, Bishop Hilarion was transferred to the See of Washington while retaining his residence in New York City. On 20 June 1996, he was transferred to the Diocese of Australia and New Zealand (which was experiencing problems at that stage) and raised to the rank of archbishop.

In December 2003, the Council of Bishops of the ROCOR awarded him the honour of wearing a diamond cross on his klobuk.

In May 2006, the Council of Bishops of the ROCOR appointed him Chief Deputy of the President of the Synod of Bishops with residence in New York.

=== First-Hierarch of the ROCOR ===
On 12 May 2008, Archbishop Hilarion was elected and elevated as the new First-hierarch of the ROCOR, having received 9 votes out of 11. On 14 May of that year, he was approved by the Holy Synod of the Moscow Patriarchate to the post of the primate and elevated to the rank of metropolitan. On 18 May, he was enthroned in New York City. On 10 December 2008, he was appointed a member of the Preparatory Commission for the Local Council of the Russian Orthodox Church. He was the first Metropolitan of Eastern America and New York born in North America.

On the first day of the 2022 Russian invasion of Ukraine, Hilarion, an ethnic Ukrainian who spoke Ukrainian at home as a child, issued an "Epistle to the Clergy and Flock ... on Great Lent and on the Events on the Holy Ukrainian Land" commencing:

As we approach Great Lent, this salvific time of profound prayer and self-correction, and in connection with the events in the Ukrainian land, I turn to all with a heartfelt plea: to refrain from excessive watching television, following newspapers and the internet, to close our hearts to the passions ignited by mass media, while doubling our fervent prayers for peace throughout the world, for overcoming enmity and discord, for help for the suffering, for the repose of those who have departed into the eternal life and the consolation of their friends and relatives, so that we all first and foremost remain humane and Orthodox Christians in these difficult times.

== Death ==
On 16 May 2022, Metropolitan Hilarion died in a New York City hospital, following a lengthy period of ill health. He was 74. He is buried in the monastic brotherhood cemetery behind Holy Trinity Cathedral in Jordanville, NY.

== Sources ==
- Biography
- Biography at Moscow Patriarchate official site (in Russian)
- Archbishop Hilarion of Sydney elected ROCOR head
- Anniversary of the enthronement of met. Hilarion, Russian Church Abroad. His enthronement speech
- http://www.russianorthodoxchurch.ws/synod/eng2008/5enizbrany.html
- http://www.synod.com/synod/engdocuments/enart_mhinterviewpriesthood.html
- http://synod.com/english/pages/legacy/hillarioninterview.html
