= Daniel of Erie =

Bishop Daniel
- Bishop of Erie
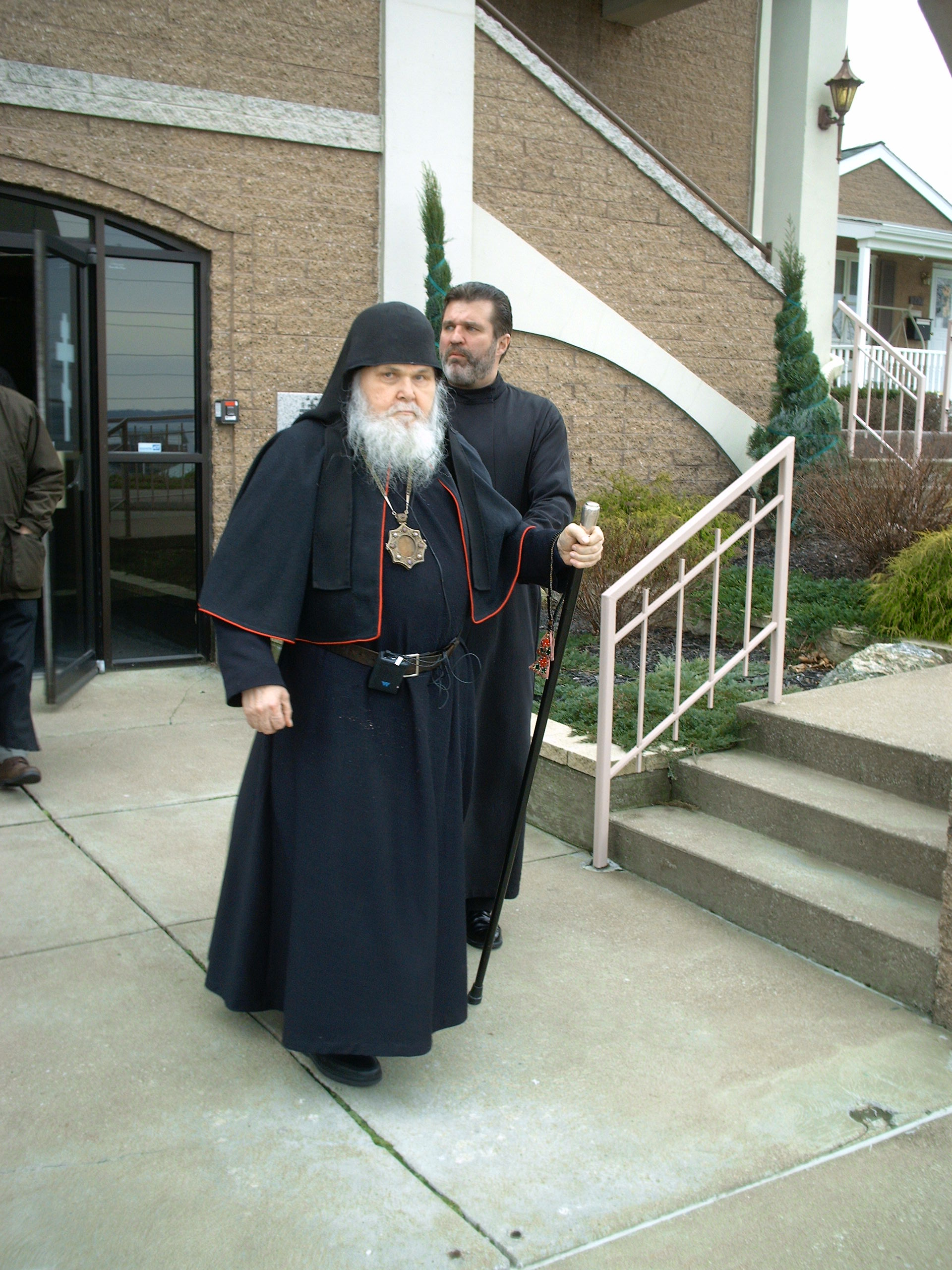
- Church: Russian Orthodox Church Outside Russia (ROCOR)

Orders
- Ordination: August 1965
- Consecration: August 14, 1988

Personal details
- Born: Dmitry Borisovich Alexandrov; September 15, 1930; Odesa, Ukrainian SSR, Soviet Union
- Died: April 26, 2010 (aged 79); Erie, Pennsylvania, U.S.

Daniel of Erie (secular name Dmitry Borisovich Alexandrov, Дмитрий Борисович Александров; September 15, 1930 – April 26, 2010) was an American Russian Orthodox bishop of the Russian Orthodox Church Outside Russia.

== Life ==
He was born in 1930 in Odesa, Soviet Union. Due to anti-Communist family connections, Dmitry's father, Boris Alexandrov, decided to move the family to Zlatoust in the Ural Mountains in 1938. Within just a few months of the move, Boris was arrested and disappeared; it was later found out he was executed. Mrs. Alexandrov then moved her family back to Odesa.

In 1944 they left westward with the fleeing German Army, and within two years found themselves living in the Alps. Thanks to family in the United States, the Alexandrovs were able to emigrate to America, and came to New York City in 1949. From 1952 to 1958, Dmitry studied at Holy Trinity Orthodox Seminary (Jordanville, New York), finishing with the first graduating class, along with the future Metropolitan Laurus (Škurla).

From his early years, Dmitry Borisovich was interested in the pre-Nikonian "Old Rite" of the Russian Orthodox Church, and decided to work toward somehow healing the schism of the Old Believers.

In August 1965, he was ordained deacon, and soon afterwards, priest.

In 1988, he received the monastic tonsure and the new name of Daniel. On August 13, 1988, Hieromonk Daniel was consecrated a vicar bishop for the Diocese of Eastern America, with the title "Bishop of Erie, Pennsylvania, Defender of the Old Rite". The Church of the Nativity was his Cathedra; he played an integral role in reuniting the congregation with the Russian Orthodox Church. He was temporary administrator of the Diocese of Australia and New Zealand from 1995 to 1996.

Bishop Daniel died on April 26, 2010.
