= Hieromonk =

In Eastern Christianity, a monk who is also a priest

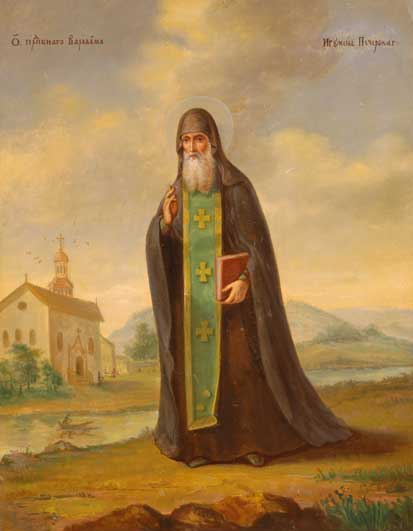
Barlaam of the Kiev Caves Monastery, wearing his monastic habit and priestly epitrachelion

A hieromonk, (Note: Greek: Ἱερομόναχος, romanized: Ieromonachos; Georgian: მღვდელმონაზონი; Slavonic: Иеромонахъ; Russian: Иеромонах; Serbian: јеромонах, romanized: jeromonah; Bulgarian: йеромонах, romanized: yeromonakh; Romanian: Ieromonah; Albanian: Hieromurg) also called a priestmonk, is a person who is both monk and priest in the Eastern Christian tradition.

A hieromonk can be either a monk who has been ordained to the priesthood or a priest who has received monastic tonsure. When a married priest's wife dies, it is not uncommon for him to become a monk, since the Church forbids clergy to enter into a second marriage after ordination and he can be no longer promoted to any higher grade.

Ordination to the priesthood is the exception rather than the rule for monastics, as a monastery will usually only have as many hieromonks and hierodeacons as it needs to perform the daily services.

In the church hierarchy, a hieromonk is of higher dignity than a hierodeacon, just as a secular (i.e., married) priest is of higher dignity than a deacon. Within their own ranks, hieromonks are assigned order of precedence according to the date of their ordination. Ranking above a hieromonk are a hegumen and an archimandrite.

== Forms of address ==
The proper title for a hieromonk is, "the Reverend Hieromonk (religious name)". The form of address is, "Hieromonk (name)", "Father Hieromonk (name)", "Father (name)", or, informally, "Father". As with all Eastern Catholic and Orthodox monks, a hieromonk is not addressed by his family name, but only by his religious name.

In writing, if it becomes necessary to use his family name—for instance, to distinguish him from another hieromonk with the same religious name—the family name should be placed in parentheses. Example: "Hieromonk John (Smith)". In cultures where a patronymic is customary, monks are never addressed by their patronymic, but only by their religious name.

== In other countries and Western Christianity ==
In some countries, married clergy are referred to as "white clergy", while monastic clergy are called "black clergy" because monks should always wear black clothing but married clergy in many parts of the world typically wear white (or gray, blue or some other color) cassocks and rasons.

In Western Christianity, a priest who is also a monk is termed a "religious priest" or "regular clergy", i.e., living under a monastic rule (Latin: regula).

== Notable people ==
- Hieromonk Matthew (fl. late 14th century), Byzantine hieromonk
- Hieromonk Makarije (fl. 1494–1528), Serbian Orthodox, printer
- Hieromonk Pahomije (fl. 1496–1544), Serbian Orthodox, printer
- Hieromonk Mardarije (fl. 1552–66), Serbian Orthodox, printer
- Mojsije Dečanac (fl. 1536–45), Serbian Orthodox, printer
- Hieromonk Neofytos (1876–1967), Greek Orthodox, priest
- Ilie Cătărău (1888–c. 1955), Romanian Orthodox, adventurer and spy
- St. John of Shanghai and San Francisco (1896-1966), Russian Orthodox, bishop
- Seraphim Rose (1934–1982), American Russian Orthodox, translator and author
- Hieromonk Nilus (Grigoriev) (b. 1948), Russian Orthodox, pastor and clergymen in Pskov diocese
- Hieromonk Constantine (Kallistos) (1953–1992), Russian Orthodox, founder of Holy Cross Monastery
- Hieromonk Alexander (Lisnichuk) (1963–2023), Russian-Ukrainian-American Orthodox, priest
- Hieromonk Silouan (Brown) (b. 1983), American-Russian Orthodox, priest

== See also ==
- Degrees of Eastern Orthodox monasticism
- Archimandrite
- Hegumen
- Hierodeacon
