= Hierodeacon =

Monk ordained a deacon in Eastern Orthodox Christianity

A hierodeacon (Greek: Ἱεροδιάκονος, Ierodiákonos; Slavonic: Ierodiakón), sometimes translated "deacon-monk", in Eastern Orthodox Christianity and all other Churches that follow Byzantine Rite is a monk who has been ordained a deacon (or deacon who has been tonsured monk). The term literally translates as "sacred servant (of God)", in accordance with early Byzantine usage of the adjective "sacred" to describe things monastic.

To be eligible for ordination to the diaconate, a man must be either married or tonsured a monk.

In the Church hierarchy, a hierodeacon or a secular (i.e. non-monastic) deacon is of lower rank than a hieromonk (a priest-monk) or a secular priest. Within their own ranks, hierodeacons are assigned order of precedence according to the date of their ordination. Ranking above Hierodeacon is an Archdeacon or Protodeacon.

In some countries, married clergy are referred to as "white clergy" while monastic clergy are called "black clergy" because monks should always wear black clothing but married clergy in many parts of the world typically wear white (or gray or colored) cassocks and rasons.

The proper title for a hierodeacon is, "the Reverend Hierodeacon (name)" The proper form of address would be, "Hierodeacon (name)", "Father Hierodeacon (name)", or "Father Hierodeacon".

== See also ==
- Christian monasticism
- Degrees of Eastern Orthodox monasticism
- Deacon
