= Holy Trinity Orthodox Seminary =

Orthodox Russian seminary school in Herkimer County, New York USA

- Свято-Троицкая духовная семинария в Джорданвилле
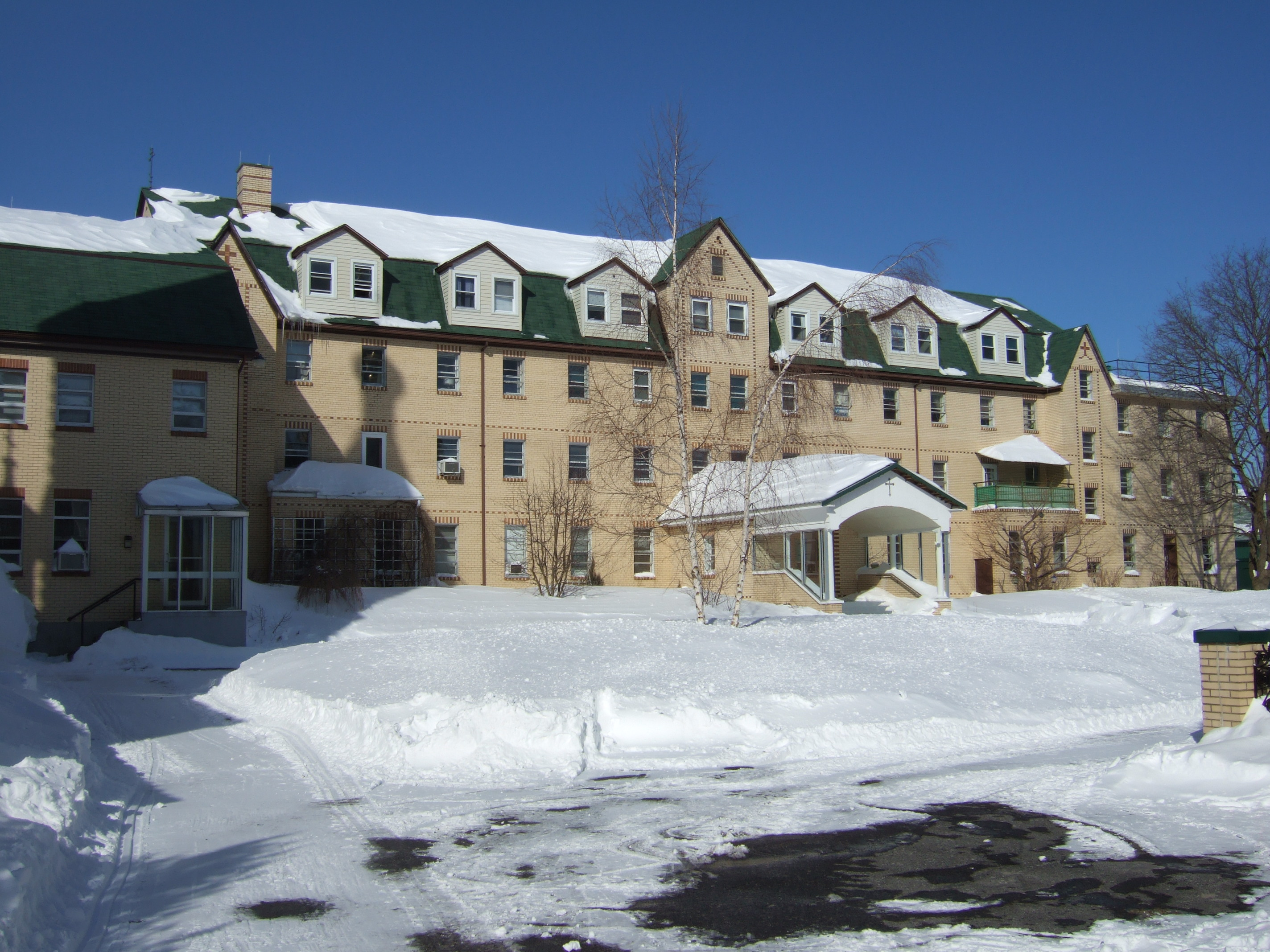
- A building of the seminary, pictured in 2007
- Type: Seminary
- Established: 1948; 78 years ago
- Religious affiliation: Russian Orthodox Church Outside Russia
- Rector: Luke Murianka
- Students: 88 (2024-25)
- Address: 1407 Robinson Road, Jordanville, New York, United States; 42°55′39.17″N 74°56′2″W
- Website: https://www.hts.edu

Holy Trinity Orthodox Seminary (Russian: Свято-Троицкая духовная семинария в Джорданвилле) is an institution of higher learning under the jurisdiction of the Russian Orthodox Church Outside of Russia (ROCOR) and located near Jordanville, New York. Associated with Holy Trinity Monastery, the seminary offers a four-year program of study leading to the degree of Bachelor of Theology (B.Th.) as well as a Master of Divinity (M.Div.) degree program that began in 2018.

== Background ==
The mission of Holy Trinity Orthodox Seminary is to serve the Russian Orthodox Church Outside of Russia by preparing students for service to the Church. It trains students in disciplines that are preparatory for active service to the Church as clergy, monastics, choir directors and cantors, iconographers, and lay leaders to realize this mission.

As the only seminary of the Russian Orthodox Church Outside of Russia, the seminary welcomes applicants not only from the United States but also from abroad. It serves parishes in all corners of the world. With the immigration of Russians to the United States, United Kingdom, and other western nations since the Revolution in the early 20th century, many members of ROCOR are now primarily English-speaking. In addition, the English language has gained prominence as an international language. Therefore, Holy Trinity Orthodox Seminary offers instruction in English to English-speaking seminarians. The Russian language continues to be taught at HTS.

The seminary emphasizes the importance of the spiritual life in theological education. Active participation in the life of the Holy Trinity Monastery, on whose premises the seminary is located, allows students to participate firsthand in the spiritual depth of the Orthodox Church and gives future clergy the opportunity to gain a thorough foundation in and experience of the Orthodox liturgical life. The seminary strives to preserve the high scholarly standards, teaching, and traditions of the Russian Orthodox Church.

The seminary is located near New York's historic Mohawk Valley, which runs through the center of the state west of the Hudson River. It is located one mile north of the village of Jordanville in Herkimer County, within a triangle formed by Cooperstown, Utica and Albany, capital of the state.

== History ==
Holy Trinity Orthodox Seminary was founded in 1948 by Archbishop Vitaly (Maximenko) under the auspices of Holy Trinity Monastery, located near Jordanville in Herkimer County in the Mohawk Valley. The life of the seminary continues to be intimately interwoven with that of the monastery. The seminary was first established as a school for the young members of the monastic brotherhood. Founders Archbishop Vitaly and Dean Nicholas Alexander created an institution that has developed as a theological school for Orthodox Christian students from all over the world.

Pastoral courses were developed to serve the needs of non-Russian speakers, as many members of the church in the early 21st century are English speakers, either as first or second languages. The seminary has also expanded its mission by adding a summer school on liturgical music. These changes augment the main mission and goal of the seminary: to serve the Russian Orthodox Church Outside Russia (ROCOR) through preparing students for service in the church.

This is one of only two seminaries of the Russian Orthodox Church Outside Russia. The seminary admits applicants not only from the US, but also from abroad. It emphasizes the importance of spiritual life in theological education. Active participation in the life of the monastery allows the students to experience firsthand the spiritual depth of the Orthodox Church. Future clergy have the opportunity to gain a thorough foundation and experience of the Orthodox liturgical life.

The seminary strives to preserve the high scholarly standards, teachings, and traditions of the pre-revolutionary Russian Orthodox Church. Its library, print shop, publications, museum, and archives play an important role in achieving this goal.

R. N. Verkovsky was the architect of the campus's main church, while Dimitri Blachev was the architect of the Chapel by the Lake.

== Academics ==
=== Programs ===
Holy Trinity offers a Bachelor of Theology and Master of Divinity program. For remote students it offers a Certificate of Theology.

=== Enrollment ===
In the 2024-2025 academic year, the school had a total of 88 students, with 23 being on campus and 53 under remote programs.

=== Accreditation ===
The school was accredited by the Commissioner for Education and the Board of Regents of the University of the State of New York until May 9, 2023. This is because in 2023, the Regents stopped as an accreditor for any schools whatsoever. In 2025, the school received status as a candidate for accreditation by the Middle States Commission on Higher Education.

== Publishing ==
By maintaining a religious printing press, the monastery fills a considerable need among the faithful. Several periodicals are printed in Russian and English, containing articles on contemporary religious issues, lives of saints, sermons, questions of theology, etc. Both students and faculty participate in the writing, editing and printing of these magazines. Many of the students are engaged in translating articles for publication.

== Rectors ==
- Vitaly (Maksimenko) (16 May 1948 – 1 March 1952)
- Abercius (Taushev) (March 1, 1952 – April 13, 1976)
- Laurus (Škurla) (17 July 1976 – March 16, 2008)
- Luke (Murianka) (since September 6, 2008)

== See also ==
- Eastern Orthodox Church
