= Laurus Škurla =

Russian Orthodox bishop (1928–2008)

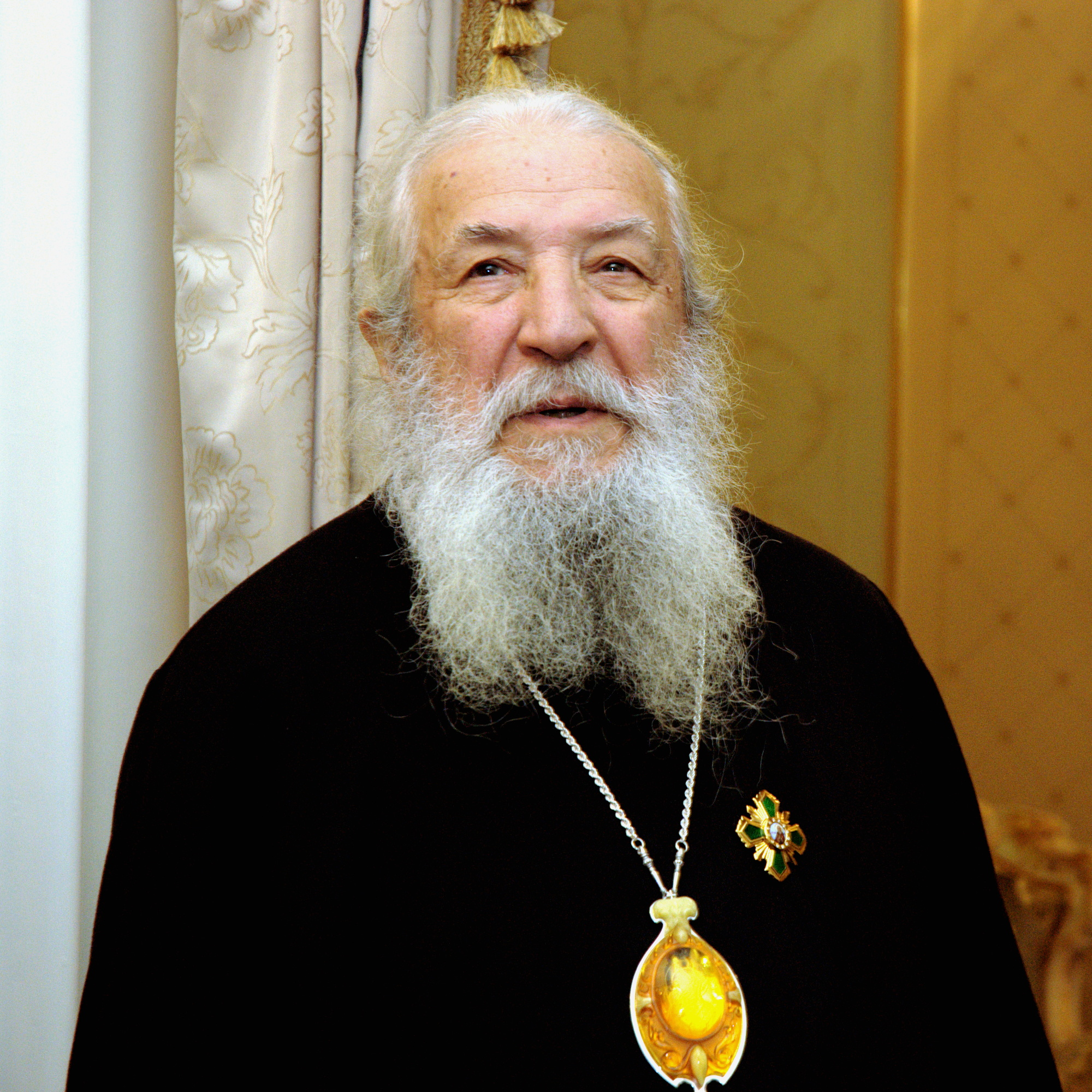
- Metropolitan Laurus in 2008
- Native name: Лавр Шкурла

Personal details
- Born: Vasily Mikhaylovich Shkurla; January 1, 1928 Ladomirová, Czechoslovakia
- Died: March 16, 2008 (aged 80) Jordanville, New York, U.S.
- Occupation: Bishop

Metropolitan Laurus (Note: Russian: Митрополит Лавр, romanized: Mitropolit Lavr; Rusyn: Митрополит Лавр, romanized: Mytropolit Lavr; Slovak: Metropolita Laurus) (January 1, 1928 – March 16, 2008, secular name Vasily Mikhaylovich Shkurla) (Note: Russian: Василий Михайлович Шкурла, romanized: Vasily Mikhaylovich Shkurla; Rusyn: Василь Шкурла, romanized: Vasyl Shkurla; Slovak: Vasiľ Škurla) was First Hierarch of the Russian Orthodox Church Outside Russia (ROCOR), the fifth cleric to hold that position. Born in Czechoslovakia, he emigrated to the United States in 1946 after World War II with brothers from his monastery. They joined the Holy Trinity Monastery in Jordanville, New York, established in 1928 by the Russian Orthodox Church Outside of Russia.

Father Laurus was ordained to the priesthood in 1954 and advanced within the church. Late in his life, after the fall of the Soviet Union, he negotiated the fourth ROCOR agreement, which reunited ROCOR to the Russian Orthodox Patriarchate based in Moscow. In 2007 he participated in a joint celebration of the Divine Liturgy with the Patriarch of Moscow at Christ the Saviour Cathedral in Moscow.

== Life ==
Vasiľ Škurla was born on January 1, 1928, in the Rusyn-inhabited village of Ladomirová, Czechoslovakia (now Slovakia), to Michal Ivanovič and Elena Michalovna Škurla. His family was Orthodox Christian in an area of the former Sáros County of the Austro-Hungarian Empire that was strongly influenced by Roman Catholicism. He was baptised by archimandrite Vitaly (Maximenko).

When he was five, Vasiľ began serving at the altar of the Church of Monastery of St. Job of Pochaev in Ladomirová, which was the parish church for the local Orthodox population. At the age of eight, young Vasiľ approached the abbot of the monastery, Archimandrite Seraphim (Ivanov), to request being accepted as a novice. In 1939, at the age of eleven, Vasiľ gained his father's permission to join the monastery. He began to participate fully in the monastery life while continuing his required secondary education. He continued the higher grades of secondary education, traveling by bicycle to and from school in the local town of Svidník. On a daily basis, he rose at 4.00 a.m. for the Midnight Office and took part in the other Divine Services.

As the Red Army approached in 1944 during World War II, the brotherhood evacuated the monastery. They moved first to Bratislava, and then on to Germany and Switzerland, as they knew the Orthodox Church had been suppressed in the Soviet Union. While in Geneva, at the age of sixteen, Vassily became a novice. In 1946, after the war, the brotherhood, including Vasiľ, emigrated to the United States.

They joined Holy Trinity Monastery in Jordanville, New York, established in 1928 by the Russian Orthodox Church Outside of Russia (ROCOR). At Jordanville, Vasiľ joined the first class of Holy Trinity Seminary, graduating in 1947 while still a novice. In March 1948, Vasiľ was one of three novices who were tonsured rasophore monks, being given the monastic name 'Laurus.' In 1949, Monk Laurus was tonsured to the small schema and then ordained to the diaconate that same year. In 1954, he was ordained to the priesthood. Fr. Laurus was elevated to igumen in 1959. In 1966, he was elevated to archimandrite.

In 1967 Laurus was elected to the episcopate, being consecrated bishop of Manhattan at the Synodal Cathedral of the Theotokos of the Sign in New York City. With this elevation came an assignment as secretary of the Synod of Bishops.

In 1976 Laurus was elected abbot of Holy Trinity Monastery. He was also appointed as Bishop of Syracuse and Holy Trinity by the Synod of Bishops. In the following years, Laurus traveled and led many pilgrimages throughout the Orthodox Christian world, including to Israel and Mount Athos. In 1981, he was elevated to archbishop.

In October 2001, after the retirement of Metropolitan Vitaly (Ustinov), Archbishop Laurus was elected by the Synod of Bishops as metropolitan of Eastern America and New York and the first hierarch of the Russian Orthodox Church Outside Russia.

Between May 6 and May 14, 2006, Laurus chaired the fourth All-Diaspora Council of ROCOR. By that time, the Soviet Union had fallen and the Russian Orthodox Church began to operate openly again in Russia. The Council gave approval for reconciliation and normalization of relations with the Moscow Patriarchate.

On May 17, 2007, Laurus, with many of the clergy of ROCOR, participated in the signing of the Act of Canonical Communion in Moscow, Russia. He participated in a joint celebration of the Divine Liturgy with the Patriarch of Moscow at Christ the Saviour Cathedral in Moscow. This historic occasion brought together the churches which had long been separated.

Metropolitan Laurus died aged 80, in the Holy Trinity Monastery, Jordanville, on March 16, 2008. He was buried on March 21 alongside previous leaders of the Russian Church Abroad at Holy Trinity Monastery's cemetery.

He was succeeded as First Hierarch of the Russian Orthodox Church Outside of Russia by Metropolitan Hilarion (Kapral).
