= List of bishops of the Russian Orthodox Church Outside of Russia =

List of the Metropolitan bishops, archbishops, and bishops of the Russian Orthodox Church Outside Russia since 1920.

== Living ==
=== First Hierarchs ===
- Nicholas (Olhovsky), Metropolitan of Eastern America and New York, First Hierarch of the Russian Orthodox Church Outside of Russia

=== Metropolitans ===
- Mark (Arndt), Metropolitan of Berlin & Germany

=== Archbishops ===
- Kyrill (Dmitrieff), Archbishop of San Francisco & Western America
- Gabriel (Chemodakov), Archbishop of Montreal & Canada
- Vacant Archbishop of Chicago & Mid-America
- George (Schaefer), Archbishop of Sydney, Australia & New Zealand

=== Bishops ===
- John (Bērziņš), Bishop of Caracas and South America
- Irenei (Steenberg), Bishop of London and Western Europe
- Theodosius (Ivashchenko), Bishop of Seattle, vicar of the Western American Diocese
- Luke (Murianka), Bishop of Syracuse, vicar of the Eastern American Diocese
- Alexander (Echevaria), Bishop of Vevey, vicar of the Western European Diocese
- James (Corazza), Bishop of Sonora, second vicar of the Western American Diocese
- Job (Bandmann), Bishop of Stuttgart, vicar of the German Diocese

=== Retired Bishops ===
- Retired Diocesan Bishops:
  - Michael (Donskoff), retired Archbishop of Geneva & Western Europe
- Retired Vicar Bishops:
  - Jerome (Shaw), retired Bishop of Manhattan
- Bishops Received into the ROCOR in Retirement:
  - Jonah (Paffhausen), retired; former Archbishop of Washington, Metropolitan of All America and Canada in the OCA
  - Nikolai (Soraich), retired; former Bishop of Sitka and Alaska in the OCA

== Reposed (Dead) ==
=== First Hierarchs ===
- Anthony (Khrapovitsky), Metropolitan of Kiev & Galicia (28 July/10 August 1936)
- Anastasius (Gribanovsky), Metropolitan of Chişinău & Khotin (8/21 May 1965)
- Philaret (Voznesensky), Metropolitan of Eastern America & New York (8/21 November 1985)
- Vitaly (Ustinov), ret. Metropolitan of Eastern America & New York (25 September 2006)
- Laurus (Shkurla), Metropolitan of Eastern America & New York (16 March 2008)
- Hilarion (Kapral), Metropolitan of Eastern America & New York (16 May 2022)

=== Metropolitans ===
- Methodius (Gerasimov), Metropolitan of Harbin and Manchuria (15/28 March 1931)
- Innocent (Figurovsky), Metropolitan of Peking & China (15/28 June 1931)
- Seraphim (Lade), Metropolitan of Berlin & Germany (1/14 September 1950)
- Panteleimon (Rozhnovsky), ret. Metropolitan of Minsk & Byelorussia (17/30 December 1950)
- Augustine (Peterson), ret. Metropolitan of Riga and Latvia (4 October 1955)

=== Archbishops ===
- Simon (Vinogradov), Archbishop of Peking & China (11/24 February 1933)
- Gabriel (Chepur), Archbishop of Chelyabinsk & Troitsk (1/14 March 1933)
- Apollinarius (Koshevoy), Archbishop of North America (6/19 June 1933)
- Sergius (Petrov), ret. Archbishop of Black Sea & Novorossisk (11/24 January 1935)
- Damian (Govorov), ret. Archbishop of Tsarytsin (6/19 April 1936)
- Theophanes (Bystrov), ret. Archbishop of Poltava and Pereyaslavl (6/19 February 1940)
- Theophanes (Gavrilov), Archbishop of Kursk and Oboyan (1943)
- Tikhon (Lyaschenko), ret. Archbishop of Berlin & Germany (11/24 February 1945)
- Arsenius (Chagovets), ret. Archbishop of Winnipeg (4 October 1945)
- Benedict (Bobkovsky), Archbishop of Berlin & Germany (21 August/3 September 1950 or 1951)
- Theodore (Rafalsky), Archbishop of Sydney, Australia & New Zealand (23 April/6 May 1955)
- Joasaph (Skorodumov), Archbishop of Argentina & Paraguay (13/26 November 1955)
- Hieronymus (Chernov), Archbishop of Detroit & Flint (1/14 May 1957)
- Gregory (Borishkevich), Archbishop of Chicago & Cleveland (13/26 October 1957)
- Vitalis (Maximenko), Archbishop of Eastern America & Jersey City (8/21 March 1960)
- Tikhon (Troitsky), Archbishop of Western America & San Francisco (17/30 March 1963)
- Stephen (Sevbo), Archbishop of Vienna & Austria (12/25 January 1965)
- John (Maximovich), Archbishop of Western America & San Francisco (19 June/2 July 1966)
- Theodosius (Samoilovich), Archbishop of São Paulo & Brazil (13/29 February 1968)
- Leontius (Filippovich), Archbishop of Buenos Aires, Argentina, Chile & Paraguay (19 June/2 July 1971)
- Alexander (Lovchy), Archbishop of Berlin & Germany (29 August/11 September 1973)
- Ambrose (Merezhko), ret. Archbishop of Pittsburgh & West Pennsylvania (26 November/9 December 1975)
- Abercius (Taushev), Archbishop of Syracuse & Trinity (31 March/13 April 1976)
- Sabbas (Rayevsky), Archbishop of Sydney, Australia & New Zealand (4/17 April 1976)
- Nikon (Rklitsky), Archbishop of Washington & Florida (22 August/4 September 1976)
- Nicodemus (Nagayev), Archbishop of Richmond & Great Britain (4/17 October 1976)
- Andrew (Rymarenko), Archbishop of Rockland (29 June/12 July 1978)
- Theodosius (Putilin), Archbishop of Sydney, Australia & New Zealand (31 July/13 August 1980)
- Athanasius (Martos), Archbishop of Buenos Aires, Argentina & Paraguay (21 October/3 November 1983)
- Philotheus (Narko), Archbishop of Berlin & Germany (11/24 September 1986)
- Nathaniel (Lvov), Archbishop of Vienna & Austria (27 October/8 November 1986)
- Seraphim (Ivanov), Archbishop of Chicago, Detroit & the Midwest (12/25 July 1987)
- Anthony (Bartoshevich), Archbishop of Geneva & Western Europe (25 August/7 September 1993)
- Paul (Pavlov), ret. Archbishop of Sydney, Australia & New Zealand (2/15 February 1995)
- Anthony (Sinkevich), Archbishop of Los Angeles & Southern California (18/31 July 1996)
- Seraphim (Svezhevsky), ret. Archbishop of Caracas & Venezuela (31 August/13 September 1996)
- Anthony (Medvedev), Archbishop of West America and San-Francisco (23 September 2000)
- Seraphim (Dulgov), ret. Archbishop of Brussels and Western Europe (24 November 2003)
- Alypius (Gamanovich), ret. Archbishop of Chicago & Mid-America (28 April 2019)
- Agapit (Gorachek), Archbishop of Stuttgart, vicar of the German Diocese (28 May 2020)
- Peter (Loukianoff), Archbishop of CHicago & Mid-America (8 November 2024)

=== Bishops ===
- Michael (Bogdanov), Bishop of Cheboksary (9/22 July 1925)
- Michael (Kosmodemyansky), Bishop of Alexandrovsk (9/22 September 1925)
- Jonah (Pokrovsky), Bishop of Hankou (7/20 October 1925)
- Elias (Gevargizov), Bishop of Salma in Urmia (December 1928)
- Nicholas (Karpov), Bishop of London (12/25 October 1932)
- Anthony (Dashkevich), ret. Bishop of Alaska & the Aleutians (15 March 1934)
- Gorazd (Pavlík), The Bishop of Czech (4 September 1942)
- Basil (Pavlovsky), Bishop of Vienna & Austria (10/23 October 1945)
- Eulogius (Markovsky), Bishop of Caracas & Venezuela (1951)
- Leontius (Bartoshevich), Bishop of Geneva (6/19 August 1956)
- John (Gevargizov), ret. Bishop of Salma & Urmia (1962)
- Agapetus (Kryzhanovsky), ret. Bishop of Goiana (27 August/9 September 1966)
- Sava (Saračević), ret. Bishop of Edmonton (17/30 January 1973)
- Nectarius (Kontsevich), Bishop of Seattle (4/26 January 1983)
- Nicander (Paderin), Bishop of São Paulo & Brazil (2/19 December 1987)
- Innocent (Petrov), Bishop of Buenos Aires, Argentina & Paraguay (10/23 December 1987)
- John (Legky), Bishop of Buenos Aires, Argentina & Paraguay (20 February/5 March 1995)
- Gregory (Grabbe), ret. Bishop of Washington & Florida (24 September /7 October 1995)
- Constantine (Jesensky), ret. Bishop of Boston (18/31 May 1996)
- Mitrophan (Znosko-Borovsky), Bishop of Boston (15 February 2002)
- Alexander (Mileant), Bishop of Buenos Aires and South America (18 September 2005)
- Ambrose (Cantacuzène), ret. Bishop of Geneva and Western Europe (22 July 2009)
- Daniel (Alexandrov), Bishop of Erie (26 April 2010)
- Barnabas (Prokofiev), defrocked (in 2014) bishop

== Bishops Who Departed the Ranks of the ROCOR Hierarchy ==
- Living:
  - Benjamin (Rusalenko), went into schism in 2001
  - Agathangel (Pashkovsky), went into schism in 2007
  - Eutychus (Kurochkin), went Moscow Patriarchate in 2007
  - Archbishop Gregory of Denver and Northern America went into schism in 2000
- Reposed:
  - Mitrophan (Abramov), went Serbian Orthodox Church in 1922
  - Benjamin (Fedchenkov), went Ecumenical Patriarchate of Constantinople in 1923
  - Platon (Rozhdestvensky), went Northern-American metropolis in 1924
  - Eulogius (Georgievsky), went Western-European Metropolis in 1926
  - Vladimir (Tikhonitsky), went Western-European Metropolis in 1926
  - Sergius (Korolyov), went Western-European Metropolis in 1926
  - Hermogenes (Maximov), went schism in 1942
  - Meletius (Zaborovsky), went Moscow Patriarchate in 1945
  - Victor (Svyatin), went Moscow Patriarchate in 1945
  - Nestor (Anisimov), went Moscow Patriarchate in 1945
  - Juvenal (Kilin), went Moscow Patriarchate in 1945
  - Demetrius (Voznesensky), went Moscow Patriarchate in 1945
  - Alexis (Panteleyev), went Moscow Patriarchate in 1945
  - Seraphim (Loukianov), went Moscow Patriarchate in 1945
  - Seraphim (Sobolev), went Moscow Patriarchate in 1945
  - Philip (Gardner), Bishop of Potsdam. Defrocked in 1945. (9 December 1898 - 26 February 1984)
  - Macarius (Ilyinsky), went Moscow Patriarchate in 1946
  - Paul (Meletiev), went Catholic church in 1946
  - Theophilus (Pashkovsky), went Northern-American metropolis in 1946
  - Leontius (Turkevich), went Northern-American metropolis in 1946
  - Demetrius (Magan), went Northern-American metropolis in 1946 (1 April 1970)
  - John (Zlobin), went Northern-American metropolis in 1946
  - Panteleimon (Rudyk), went Moscow Patriarchate in 1959
  - James (Toombs), Bishop of Manhattan, went schism in 1959
  - John-Nectaire (Kovalevsky), went schism in 1966
  - Jakob (Akkersdijk), Bishop of Hague; went Moscow Patriarchate in 1972
  - Kyrill (Yonchev), went OCA in 1976
  - Valentine (Rusantsov), went schism in 1994
  - Lazarus (Zhurbenko), went schism in 2001
