= First Hierarch of the Russian Orthodox Church Outside of Russia =

Primate of the Russian Orthodox Church Outside Russia

First Hierarch of the Russian Orthodox Church Abroad
- Bishopric

Russian Orthodox Church
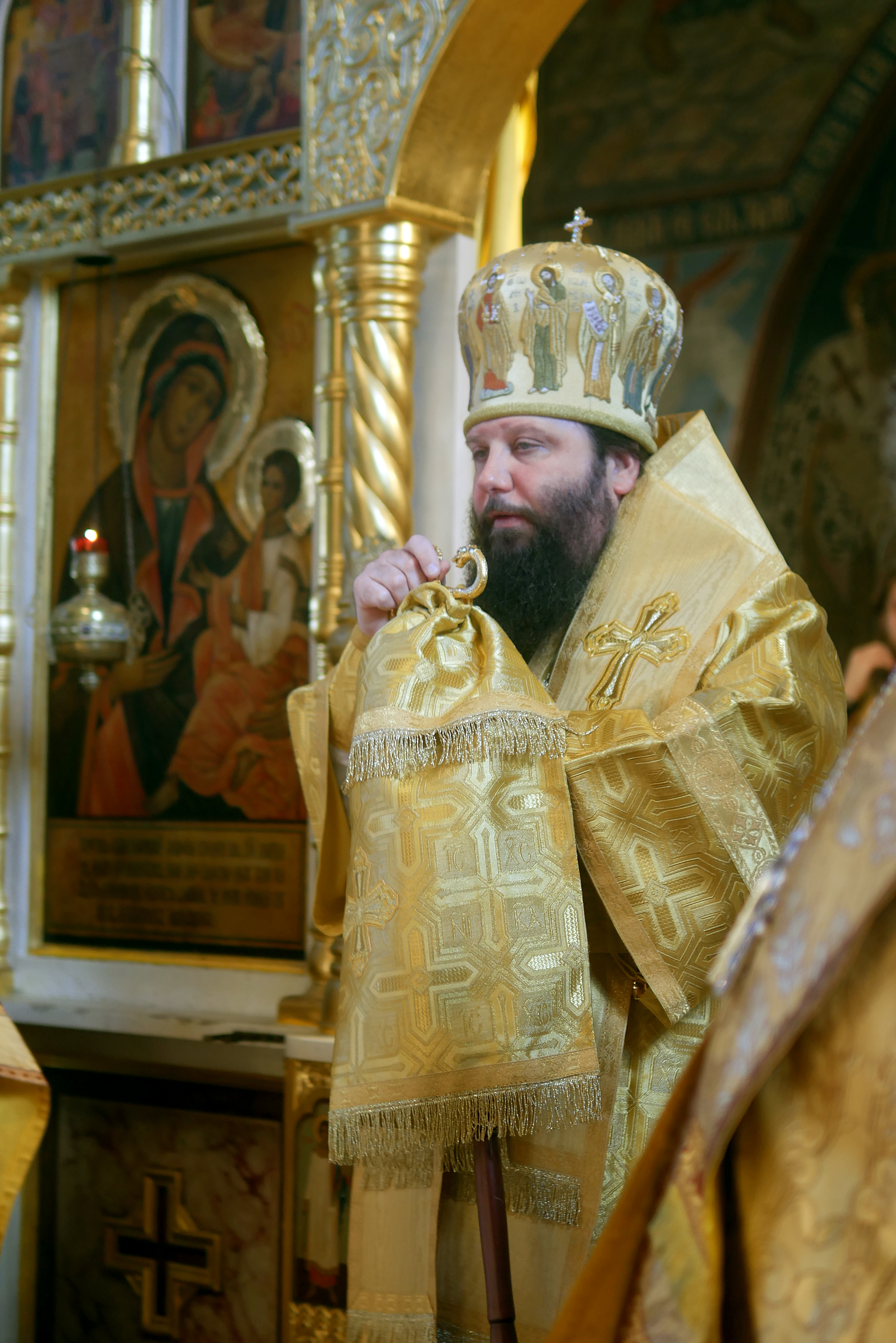
- Incumbent: Metropolitan Nicholas (Olhovsky) since 18 September 2022

Location
- Residence: New York City, U.S.

Information
- First holder: Metropolitan Antony (Khrapovitsky)
- Established: 19 November 1920
- Parent church: Russian Orthodox Church Outside Russia
- Patriarch: Patriarch Kirill of Moscow

Website
- synod.com

The First Hierarch of the Russian Orthodox Church Outside of Russia, or Russian Orthodox Church Abroad, is the primate of the Russian Orthodox Church Outside Russia, a semi-autonomous Church under the Russian Orthodox Church (Moscow Patriarchate).

The position of First Hierarch is currently occupied by Nicholas (Olhovsky). The see of the First Hierarch is currently the Russian Orthodox Eparchy of Eastern America and New York.

== List of holders ==
No.	Primate	Portrait	Reign		
1	Anthony; Aleksey Khrapovitsky (1863–1936)		19 November 1920	10 August 1936	15 years, 8 months and 22 days
2	Anastasius; Alexander Gribanovsky (1873–1965)		10 August 1936	27 May 1964	27 years, 9 months and 17 days
3	Philaret; Georgy Voznesensky (1903–1985)		27 May 1964	21 November 1985	21 years, 5 months and 25 days
4	Vitaly; Rostislav Ustinov (1910–2006)		22 January 1986	10 August 2001	15 years, 6 months and 19 days
5	Laurus; Vasily Shkurla (1928–2008)		28 October 2001	16 March 2008	6 years, 4 months and 17 days
6	Hilarion; Igor Kapral (1948–2022)		18 May 2008	16 May 2022	13 years, 11 months and 28 days
7	Nicholas; Nikolay Olhovsky (born 1974)		18 September 2022	Incumbent	3 years, 3 months and 11 days (as of 29 December 2025)

== See also ==
- List of bishops of the Russian Orthodox Church Outside of Russia
- Eastern Orthodox Church
- White émigré
