= Michael Donskoff =

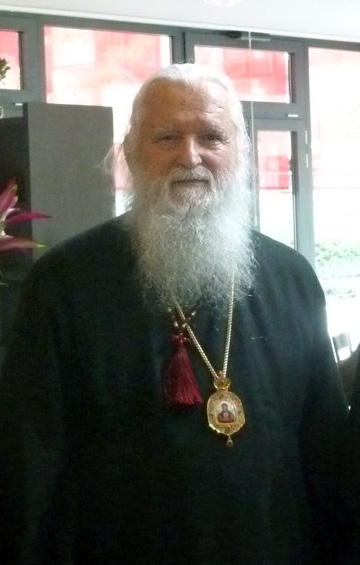
Archbishop Michael (Donskoff)

Archbishop Michael (Russian: Архиепископ Михаил, secular name Simeon Vasilyevich Donskoff, Russian: Симеон Васильевич Донсков; 29 March 1943, Paris) is a retired bishop of the Russian Orthodox Church Outside of Russia, archbishop of Geneva and Western Europe (2006-2017).

== Life ==
Simeon Donskoff was born on March 29, 1943, in Paris, France to the family of Don Cossack Vasiliy Semyonovich Donskoff. He received his education in France and completed the 10-year Russian school of A. M. Osorgina where he studied the Law of God, literature, Russian language, and history.

Between 1965 and 1966 he completed his military service, where he served in the medical corp.

In 1966 he received the Diplôme de Moniteur des Colonies de Vacances, which allowed him to become an instructor in Orthodox youth camps, directing youth camps in France and Austria.

In 1979 he was tonsured reader by archbishop Anthony (Bartoshevich). In 1980, he was ordained sub-deacon. In 1981, he was ordained deacon by archbishop Anthony and in 1991 he was ordained a priest.

In 1994 and 1995 he also directed youth camps in Russia. At the same time he worked in hospitals and reanimation clinics in Paris.

On Bright Friday of 1996, he was tonsured a monk by Metropolitan Vitaly (Ustinov) and on Thomas Sunday he was elevated to the rank of hegumen.

On the feast of Saints Peter and Paul that same year he was consecrated bishop of Toronto, vicar for the administration of the Montreal and Canada diocese.

In 2002 he received the title of Bishop of Boston, vicar of the Russian Orthodox Eparchy of Eastern America and New York.

At the Council of Bishops in May 2006, he was transferred to the Geneva and Western European Diocese.

December 9, 2011 at the winter session of the Synod of Bishops of the Russian Orthodox Church he was elevated to the rank of archbishop

In 2018 he was retired.
