= Alexander Mileant =

Russian bishop

Bishop Alexander (secular name Alexander Vasilievich Mileant, Russian: Александр Васильевич Милеант; 22 July 1938 – 12 September 2005) was Bishop of Buenos Aires and South America of the Russian Orthodox Church Outside Russia.

Bishop Alexander is well known for his missionary leaflets. From 1985 to 2005 Bishop Alexander published a total of 763 brochures: 300 in Russian, 192 in English, 168 in Spanish and 103 in Portuguese.

== Early years ==
The future Bishop Alexander was born in 1938 in Odessa in a military family, a descendant of a Russian noble family. After his father Vasiliy Mileant went missing on the front during World War II in 1941, his family emigrated to the West. They first lived in Europe (Prague, then Rome) until 1948, when the whole family moved to Buenos Aires, Argentina.

From an early age, in Europe, Alexander served under Bishop Panteleimon (Rudyk), and then Athanasius (Martos). Bishop Athanasius had a large library of holy books, which the young Alexander loved to read. Alexander, who desired to read "The Lives of the Saints" in the original, first studied the modern Greek language and later ancient Greek.

At the end of 1963 he entered Holy Trinity Orthodox Seminary, located at Holy Trinity Monastery in Jordanville, New York. He completed seminary with a Bachelor in Theology Degree in 1967.

== Priest ==
In 1967, after Great Lent, the future Bishop Alexander was ordained to the priesthood by Metropolitan Philaret (Voznesensky) and assigned to serve in the Protection of the Holy Virgin Church in Los Angeles, where he served 31 years of his life.

He conducted services in both Church Slavonic and in English. The church also had a parish Russian School attended by as many as 110 children.

From 1971–1985, Fr. Alexander organized pilgrimages for youth to holy places in Greece and the Holy Land. Starting in 1985, Fr. Alexander began publishing "Missionary leaflets" in four languages: Russian, English, Spanish and Portuguese.

In 1995, during Great Lent, Fr. Alexander was tonsured into the mantia at the Holy Trinity Monastery with the name Alexander, in honor of Hieromartyr Alexander of Kharkov (before this he was named in honor of St. Alexander Nevsky)

== Bishop ==
On May 28, 1998, in the Synodal Cathedral of the Sign in New York City, he was consecrated Bishop of Buenos Aires and South America. The ordination was performed by Archbishop Anthony (Medvedev) of Western America and San Francisco, Archbishop Laurus (Škurla) of Syracuse and Holy Trinity, Bishop Agathangel (Pashkovsky) of Simferopol and Crimea, Bishop Mitrophan (Znosko-Borovsky) of Boston, and Bishop Gabriel (Chemodakov) of Manhattan.

In the last years of his life Alexander suffered from cancer. Because of his illness, he rarely visited his cathedral in Buenos Aires, however he sent his flock messages using modern communication methods. During that period, he served primarily at Holy Trinity Russian Orthodox Church in Oxnard, California.

Bishop Alexander actively advocated closer ties between the Russian Church Abroad and the Moscow Patriarchate. In two of his messages he stated that he is compelled by a sense of spiritual unity with the people in his homeland. He spoke frequently about the ongoing spiritual renewal of Russia and the Russian Orthodox Church where the Holy Spirit can be felt in abundance.

He died on 12 Sep 2005 in La Canada Flintridge, CA. He is buried at Holy Trinity Monastery in Jordanville, New York. Archbishop Kyrill (Dmitrieff) of San Francisco officiated at his funeral at Holy Trinity Church in Oxnard, CA, on Friday, September 16, and Metropolitan Laurus, accompanied by Bishops Gabriel (Chemodakov) of Manhattan and Peter (Loukianoff) of Cleveland, served his burial at Holy Trinity Monastery in Jordanville, NY, on Monday, September 19.
