= Christminster =

Christminster may refer to:

- Christ the Saviour Monastery, a Benedictine orthodox monastery located in Hamilton, Ontario, Canada
- Christminster (fiction), a fictional town and university in Thomas Hardy's novel Jude the Obscure
- Christminster (interactive fiction), an interactive fiction game by Gareth Rees.
