= Bishop of Chicago =

The Bishop of Chicago refers to one of the following religious leaders based in Chicago, Illinois, United States.

- Catholic Church:
  - Roman Catholic Archbishop of Chicago (Latin Church)
  - Bishop of the St. Thomas Syro-Malabar Catholic Diocese of Chicago (Syro-Malabar Church)
  - Bishop of the Ukrainian Catholic Eparchy of Saint Nicholas of Chicago (Ukrainian Greek Catholic Church)
- Episcopal Bishop of Chicago
- Bishop (or Metropolitan) of the Greek Orthodox Metropolis of Chicago
- List of bishops of the Russian Orthodox Church Outside Russia
