= Saračević =

Saračević is a surname. Notable people with the surname include:

- Hajrudin Saračević (born 1949), Bosnian football player
- Jovan Saračević (1902–1973), Bishop of the Russian Orthodox Church Outside of Russia and vicar of the Canadian diocese
- Muhammed Cham Saračević (born 2000), Austrian footballer
- Munib Saračević (1926–1988), Bosnian and Yugoslav football manager
- Zlatan Saračević (born 1956), Bosnian shot putter
- Zlatko Saračević (1961–2021), Croatian handball player
