= Alexander Nevsky Cathedral, Howell =

St. Alexander Nevsky Cathedral
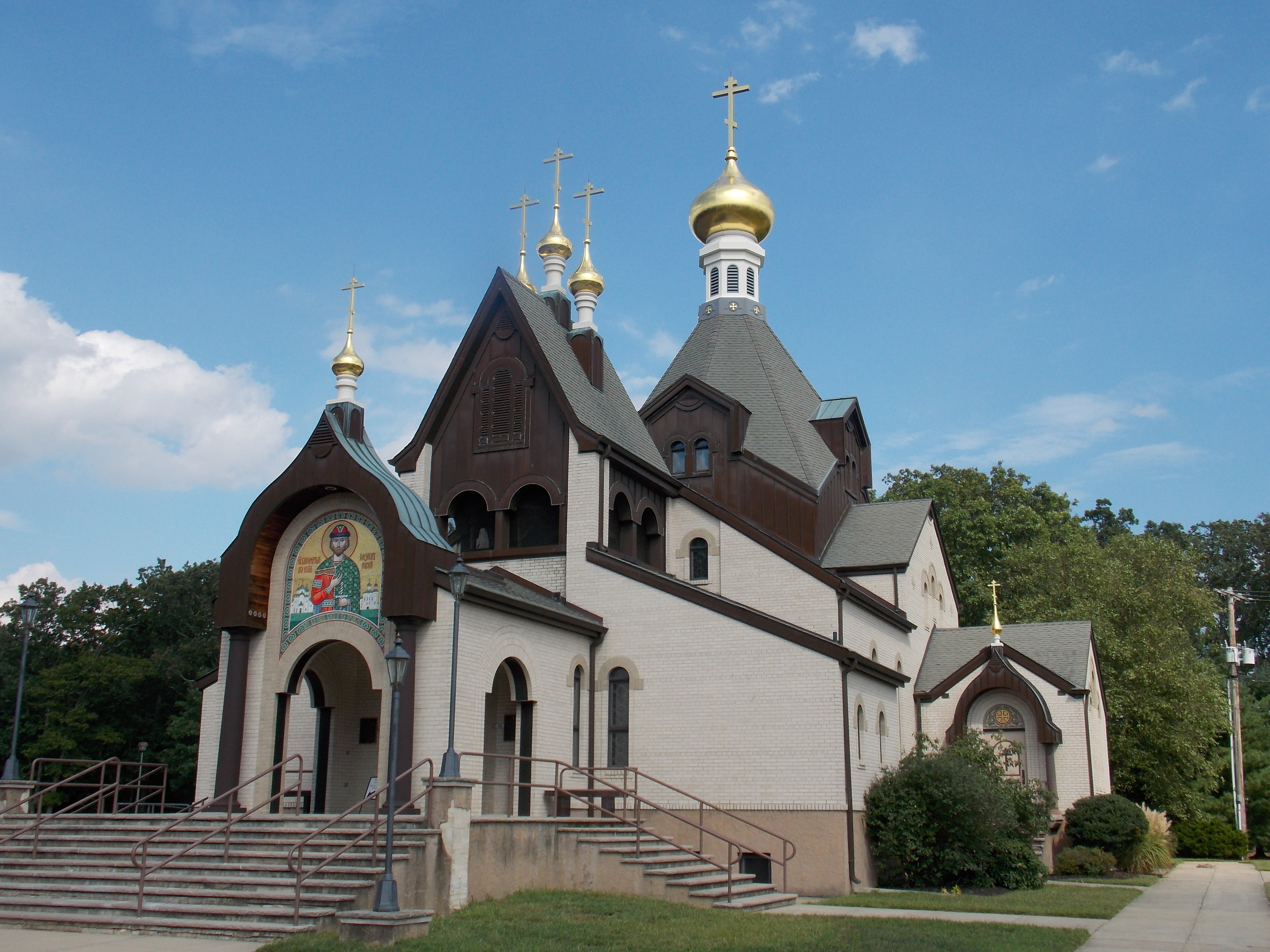

- Location in Monmouth County, New Jersey
- 40°06′54″N 74°12′59″W
- Location: 220 Alexander Ave. Howell Township, New Jersey
- Country: United States
- Denomination: Russian Orthodox Church
- Website: www.stalexandernevskycathedral.com

History
- Founded: 1936
- Dedication: Alexander Nevsky
- Consecrated: October 18, 1997

Architecture
- Architect: Nikolaus Karsanov
- Style: Byzantine Revival
- Groundbreaking: 1989
- Completed: 1994 (32 years ago)

Specifications
- Materials: Brick

The Saint Alexander Nevsky Russian Orthodox Cathedral is located in Howell Township, New Jersey, United States and is under the jurisdiction of the Russian Orthodox Church Outside of Russia (ROCOR).

== Brief history ==
The Saint Alexander Nevsky Church was established in 1936 by Archbishop Vitaly (Maximenko) (Russian: Виталий (Максименко)) on a tract of land donated by Yulia Martinovna Plavskaya. The initial chapel, dedicated to the memory of the great prince St. Alexander Nevsky (1220–1263), was blessed in May, 1936. The church building was subsequently expanded three times.

In 1987, ground was cleared for the construction of a new, second church, and on September 12, 1989, on the Feast Day of St. Alexander Nevsky, the cornerstone was laid and the relics of St. Herman of Alaska placed in the foundation. The imposing edifice, completed in 1997, is the work of Nikolaus Karsanov, architect and Protopresbyter Valery Lukianov, engineer. Funds were raised through donations.

The Great blessing of the cathedral took place on October 18, 1997, with seven bishops, headed by Metropolitan Vitaly Ustinov, and 36 priests and deacons officiating, some 800 faithful attended the festivity. The old church was rededicated to Our Lady of Tikhvin.

Metropolitan Hilarion (Kapral) announced, that cathedral will officially become the episcopal See of the Ruling Bishop of the Russian Orthodox Eparchy of Eastern America and New York and the administrative center of the Diocese on September 12, 2014.

== Parish life ==
At present the parish serves the spiritual needs of 300 members. The parochial school instructs over 90 boys and girls in religion, Russian language and history. The school meets every Saturday.

The choir is directed by Andrew Burbelo. The sisterhood attends to the needs of the church and a church council acts in the administration of the community.

== About the cathedral ==
The cathedral is decorated by frescoes in the Byzantine style. The iconography project was fulfilled by Father Andrew Erastov and his students from 1995 until 2001.
