= Anastasius Gribanovsky =

Russian Orthodox hierarch

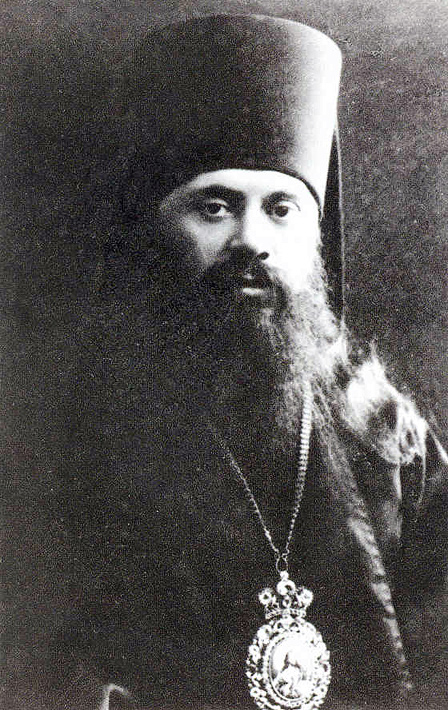
Gribanovsky in the 1910s

Metropolitan Anastasy (secular name Alexander Alexeyevich Gribanovsky, Russian: Александр Алексеевич Грибановский; August 6, 1873 – May 22, 1965) was a hierarch of the Russian Orthodox Church and the second First Hierarch of the Russian Orthodox Church Outside Russia.

== Life ==
Alexander Gribanovsky was born on August 6, 1873, in village Bratki in the Borisoglebsky Uyezd of Tambov Governorate (now Ternovsky District, Voronezh Oblast) to the Priest Aleksey Gribanovsky and Anna (née Karmazina).

After completing the Tambov theological primary school and then the Tambov theological seminary, Alexander enrolled in the Moscow Theological Academy, then under the rectorship of Archimandrite Anthony (Khrapovitsky), the future Metropolitan of Kiev and founding First Hierarch of the ROCOR. After completing the Academy in April 1898, Alexander was tonsured a monk by Bishop Alexander of Tambov with the name Anastasy after St. Anastasius Sinaita. On April 23, 1898, he was ordained a hierodeacon, and shortly thereafter a hieromonk.

In 1900, Hieromonk Anastasy was appointed inspector of the Bethany Theological Seminary near Holy Trinity Lavra. In 1901 he became inspector of the Moscow Theological Seminary, with elevation to the rank of archimandrite.

On June 29, 1906, he was ordained Bishop of Serpukhov, vicar of the Moscow diocese. At his ordination, he pronounced a remarkable homily "The True Way of Christ's Pastoral Work", in which he prophesied the upcoming turmoil and persecutions.

In the position of vicar of the Moscow diocese, Bishop Anastasy's responsibilities included daily services in the Moscow Kremlin's Dormition Cathedral, the Cathedral of Christ the Saviour, and other Muscovite churches and monasteries, as well as visitations to parishes, direction of institutions of theological learning, and direction of a committee to celebrate the 100th anniversary of the Battle of Borodino and the 300th anniversary of the Romanov dynasty.

In May 1914, Bishop Anastasy was appointed to the Kholm and Liublin diocese. A month and a half later, the First World War began, and, in addition to his diocesan duties, Bishop Anastasy served soldiers on the front, for which he was decorated with the Order of St Vladimir, and, later, the Order of St. Alexander Nevsky.

In 1915, he was forced to evacuate from the front to the interior, and lived in Moscow at the Chudov Monastery. In the end of 1915, he was appointed to the Eparchy of Chişinău and Khotin, and in 1916 he was elevated to the rank of archbishop. With the opening of the Romanian front, Archbishop Anastasy once again found himself in an area with military operations.

In August 1917 he left Bessarabia for Moscow to participate in the All-Russian Council of 1917-1918. During the election of a new Patriarch of Moscow, his candidacy received 77 votes; he then participated in the preparation for the enthronement of Patriarch St. Tikhon of Moscow, which he described in his article "Election and Enthronement of His Holiness Patriarch Tikhon, his personality and work." Archbishop Anastasy was elected a member of the Holy Synod of Bishops.

In October 1918, he departed from Moscow headed for Odessa with the hope of being able to return to Chişinău, which was under Romanian occupation. He was not able, however, to return to Bessarabia because of pressure from Romanian authorities to leave the Russian Church and enter into the jurisdiction of the Romanian Orthodox Church. He refused to join the Romanian Orthodox Church, and so remained in Odessa. With the Bolshevik invasion, he was forced to leave for Constantinople in 1919. Briefly returning to Russia, he visited Novorossiysk, Rostov, and Novocherkassk, where he made contacts with the Supreme Church Authority of South-East Russia, under the leadership of Metropolitan Anthony (Khrapovitsky). He then once again left Russia for Constantinople through Odessa.

In 1921, by decree of the Temporary Higher Church Administration Abroad, he visited Mount Athos and the Holy Land, in order to be acquainted with the state of Russian monasteries in those locations. He then participated in the first All-Diaspora Council of the ROCOR in Sremski Karlovci, Serbia, as administrator of Russian parishes in the Constantinapolitan district.

In 1923, at the invitation of Patriarch Meletius IV of Constantinople, he participated in the so-called "Pan Orthodox Congress" in Constantinople. The Congress made decisions about adopting the new calendar, allowing remarriage for clergy and married bishops, shortening services, eliminating fasts, and simplifying ecclesiastic robes. Archbishop Anastasy voiced his objections to such decisions, which he deemed uncanonical. Because the Ecumenical Patriarchate had forbidden the commemoration of Patriarch Tikhon at services in the Russian Orthodox parishes in the area and demanded that Archbishop Anastasy sever ties with the Synod Abroad of the ROCOR, he was forced to leave Constantinople for Bulgaria via France. In Bulgaria, he participated in the consecration of St. Alexander Nevsky Cathedral, and then departed for Serbia.

In 1924, he was appointed as administrator of the Russian Ecclesiastical Mission in Jerusalem and departed for the Holy Land, where he spent the next 10 years.

In 1935, Archbishop Anastasy participated in a council called by Serbian Patriarch Varnava with the aim of restoring unity in the Russian Orthodox Church abroad. The Council was attended by Metropolitan Eulogius (Georgievsky), who headed the Western European Metropolia (the predecessor to the Patriarchal Exarchate for Orthodox Parishes of Russian Tradition in Western Europe), Metropolitan Theophilus (Pashkovsky) of San Francisco, who headed the North American Metropolia (the predecessor to the Orthodox Church in America), and Bishop Dimitry (Voznesensky), who represented the Far East Metropolia. At this meeting, the unity of the Russian Orthodox Church Outside Russia was restored, albeit temporarily, and the bishops signed the Temporary Statues of the Russian Orthodox Church Abroad, which became the charter governing the ROCOR. At that time Archbishop Anastasy was elevated to the rank of metropolitan and appointed assistant to Metropolitan Anthony (Khrapovitsky).

After the death of Metropolitan Anthony in 1936, Metropolitan Anastasy was unanimously elected as the new First Hierarch of the ROCOR. In 1938, Metropolitan Anastasy presided over the second All-Diaspora Council.

With the beginning of World War II, Metropolitan Anastasy found himself once again in the zone of hostilities as German forces bombed and then occupied Belgrade in 1941. The invasion of the Soviet Union in June, 1941, prompted Joseph Stalin to reconsider state policies vis-a-vis the Russian Church. Stalin released bishops from prison and allowed churches to be reopened. With his permission, hierarchs in the Soviet Union elected Metropolitan Sergius (Stragorodsky) as Patriarch of Moscow on September 8, 1943. On October 21, 1943, in Vienna, Metropolitan Anastasy together with eight exile hierarchs denounced the election as uncanonical.

With the approach of the Soviet army on Belgrade in September, 1944, the Synod of Bishops relocated to Vienna and then, in the summer of 1945, to Munich, Germany. Starting in 1948, many Russian displaced persons began to relocate to the United States. This prompted many to call for the Synod to relocate across the Atlantic, especially given the events of the 1946 at the All-American Council of Cleveland, where the North American Metropolia voted to break ties with the ROCOR. Given these circumstances, on November 23, 1950, Metropolitan Anastasy left Munich for New York. Immediately after his arrival in the United States, on November 25, 1950, he traveled to Jordanville, New York, where he consecrated Holy Trinity Cathedral, the main church of the hamlet's Holy Trinity Monastery. The consecration was followed by the first meeting of the ROCOR Council of Bishops on US soil with the participation of 11 hierarchs.

There also, and for the first (and only) time in the history of the ROCOR, Metropolitan Anastasy officiated at the consecration of the holy chrism. Prior to this, the ROCOR had received chrism from the Serbian Orthodox Church.

Once in the United States, Metropolitan Anastasy took up residence at the New Kursk-Root Hermitage in Mahopac, New York. Metropolitan Anastasy tenure saw the blossoming of ROCOR in North America with the opening of about 100 new parishes and the consecration six new bishops: Anthony (Sinkevich) of Los Angeles, Averky (Taushev) of Syracuse and Holy Trinity, Sabbas (Rayevsky) of Sydney, Anthony (Medvedev) of San Francisco, Sava (Saračević) of Edmonton, and Nectarius (Kontzevich) of Seattle. Every summer, starting in 1951, Metropolitan Anastasy would undertake a trip across the United States to California, where he would spend a significant part of the summer in San Francisco. There, at his initiative, the Synod established the parish of All Saints of Russia in Burlingame, California.

Because of his ill health, Metropolitan Anastasy petitioned for the election of a successor in 1964. To this purpose, the Council of Bishops met on May 27, 1964, and elected Bishop Philaret (Voznesensky) of Brisbane as the new First Hierarch of the ROCOR. After Metropolitan Anastasy retired the Synod awarded him the title of "beatitude" with the right of wearing two panagias. The final act of his episcopal services saw the glorification of St. John of Kronstadt by the same Council of Bishops. Soon afterward, Metropolitan Anastasy died on May 22, 1965. He was buried at Holy Trinity Monastery in Jordanville, New York.

== Books ==
Available in English:

- Conversations With My Heart: Contemplations on God and the World. Gribanovsky, A. Translated by Nicholas Kotar. Holy Trinity Publications, 2019. ISBN 9780884654728
- A Defence of Monasticism. Gribanovsky, A. Holy Trinity Publications, 1989.

== Literature ==
- Архимандрит Аверкий (Таушев). Жизнь и деятельность Митрополита Анастасия — Мюнхен : [б. и.], 1948. — 10, [1] с.; 21 см.
- Священнослужения высокопреосвященнейшего митрополита Анастасия председателя Архирейского Синода Русской Православной церкви за границей : 50-летие, 23 апр. 1898 — 23 апр. 1948 / [А. А-ий]. — Мюнхен : [б.и.], 1948. — 28 с., [1] л. портр. : портр.; 21 см.
- Жизнь и деятельность Высокопреосвященнейшего митрополита Анастасия Председателя Архиерейского Синода Русской Православной Церкви за границей : (К 50-тилетию Архиер. служения). — Jordanville (N. Y.) : Holy Trinity monastery, 1956. — 48 с. : ил., портр.; 23 см.
- Кострюков, Андрей (2007). Русская Зарубежная Церковь в первой половине 1920-х годов. Организация церковного управления в эмиграции и его отношения с Московской Патриархией при жизни Патриарха Тихона. М.: Издательство ПСТГУ. ISBN 978-5-7429-0262-1.
- Кострюков, Андрей (2011). Русская Зарубежная Церковь в 1925—1938 гг. Юрисдикционные конфликты и отношения с московской церковной властью. Moscow: Издательство ПСТГУ. ISBN 978-5-7429-0639-1.
- Кострюков, Андрей (2015). Русская Зарубежная Церковь в 1939—1964 гг.: Административное устройство и отношения с Церковью в Отечестве. Moscow: Издательство ПСТГУ. ISBN 978-5-7429-0931-6.
