= Sava Saračević =

Bishop Sava of Edmonton
- Church: Russian Orthodox Church
- See: Diocese of Montreal and Canada
- Predecessor: Vitaly Ustinov
- Successor: Vicariate abolished

Orders
- Ordination: 28 September 1958
- Consecration: by Leontius Filippovich

Personal details
- Born: Jovan Saračević; 22 February 1902 Ljutovnica, Serbia
- Died: 30 January 1973 (aged 70) Edmonton, Alberta, Canada

Bishop Sava of Edmonton (born Jovan Saračević, Serbian Cyrillic: Јован Сарачевић, 22 February 1902 – 30 January 1973) was a Bishop of the Russian Orthodox Church Outside of Russia. He served as auxiliary bishop of Edmonton, and vicar of the Diocese of Montreal and Canada.

== Biography ==
Sava Saračević was born as Jovan Saračević in the village of Ljutovnica near Belgrade into a Serbian family. He attended schools in Čačak and Kragujevac, and graduated from the Faculty of Law at the University of Belgrade. He worked as a lawyer, then as a judge in various cities across Yugoslavia (Trelog, Čačak, Gnjilane, and Belgrade).

While practicing law, Saračević studied at the Faculty of Theology at the University of Belgrade, graduating in 1943.

After the League of Communists of Yugoslavia came to power, Saračević was persecuted as an educated Christian and a prominent figure of the old regime, forcing him to emigrate.

In early 1948, Saračević arrived in Buenos Aires, then traveled to Paraguay to meet Bishop Leontius Filippovich, where he joined the monastic community established there by Bishop Leontius. That same year, Bishop Leontius tonsured him into the Rassophore and on the Feast of the Annunciation, ordained him as a deacon.

From Paraguay, Saračević returned to Buenos Aires, where on August 28th, 1949, Archbishop Panteleimon Rudyk of Argentina and Buenos Aires elevated him to the rank of hieromonk. Saračević became a cleric at the Resurrection Cathedral in Buenos Aires, where he served for more than six years.

In December 1956, Bishop Athanasius Martos entrusted Saračević with the care of the Church of the Intercession in Temperley. In May 1958, an agreement was reached between Saračević and the artist L. N. Ryk-Kovalevskaya, where the latter would paint icons for the iconostasis. The necessary funds were raised by appealing to parishioners, who were to choose an icon and pay for its painting. Benefit concerts were also held to contribute. These initiatives were successful, quickly raising the necessary funds for all the icons. Saračević served in Temperley until his departure for New York City in August 1958.

By decision of the Holy Synod, Saračević was elected Bishop of Edmonton, vicar of Archbishop Vitaly Ustinov of Montréal and Canada.

On 28 September 1958, at the Synodal Cathedral of the Sign in New York, Saračević was ordained Bishop of Edmonton, vicar of the Canadian diocese.

Saračević was an admirer of Archbishop John Maximovich and assisted him with legal advice during his trial in San Francisco, which ended with his full acquittal. After Maximovich's death, Saračević collected materials about his life, which he later published in the journal Orthodox Russia, and later in the book Chronicle of the Veneration of Archbishop John Maximovich. These testimonies played a significant role in the canonization of Maximovich by ROCOR in 1994.

Archbishop Athanasius Martos wrote that, "among the hierarchs of the Church Abroad, he was an archpastor outstanding in his learning, eloquence, and zeal in the ministry of the Church." Metropolitan Hilarion Kapral, whom Saračević inspired to become a monk, recalled that "he was a man of profound spirituality, always referring to patristic teachings in conversation, and was extraordinarily kind."

Saračević was well versed in the works of the Church Fathers, personally copying them. He called for the creation of a Brotherhood of Spiritual Rebirth, which promoted increased prayer for the suffering of Russia. He devoted special attention to caring for new converts in Canada and the United States.

Saračević retired in September 1971. He died on January 30th, 1973 in Edmonton, Canada. He is buried in the grounds of the Holy Intercession Monastery in Bluffton, Alberta, Canada.

== Bibliography ==
- Rose, Seraphim (1987). Blessed John the Wonderworker: A Preliminary Account of the Life and Miracles of Archbishop John Maximovitch. St Herman Press. pp. 12–19. ISBN 9780938635017.
- Archbishop Athanasius of Argentina, The Necrology of Bishop Sava, Published in Nasha Strana, Buenos Aires, no. 1198, Feb. 6, 1973.
- Dragan Suboti - From our spiritual tower: bishop Sava edmontski (Govan Sarachevi, 1902-1973), ZRNM XXVIII, Chachak, 1998, pp. 251–259)

== Published works ==
- Saračević, Jovan (1934), Самоубиство као последица моралне одговорности свештеника — одговор свештенику г. Милутиновићу, «Чачански глас», бр. 12, Чачак, 25. March 1934, p. 4.
- Saračević, Sava (1979). Blessed John: The Chronicle of the Veneration of Archbishop John Maximovich. Saint Herman of Alaska Brotherhood. OCLC 9055238.
- Saračević, Sava (1998). Летопись почитания архиепископа Иоанна (Максимовича). OCLC 40813541.
