= Holy Trinity Orthodox Church (Mebane, North Carolina) =

- Holy Trinity Russian Orthodox Church
- Holy Trinity Orthodox Church
- 36°5′14.8″N 79°14′9.1″W
- Location: 6803 US 70 Mebane, North Carolina
- Country: United States
- Denomination: Russian Orthodox Church Outside of Russia
- Website: Holy Trinity Russian Orthodox Church

History
- Founded: 1991

Architecture
- Functional status: Active
- Architectural type: Church

Holy Trinity Russian Orthodox Church is a Russian Orthodox church in Mebane, North Carolina. It is one of three Russian Orthodox churches in North Carolina.

== History ==
Holy Trinity is part of the Eastern American Diocese of the Russian Orthodox Church Outside Russia. The congregation was formed in 1991 before purchasing a small carpenter's shop off of U.S. Highway 70 in Mebane. The current church was opened in 2007.
