= Ljutovnica =

- Village
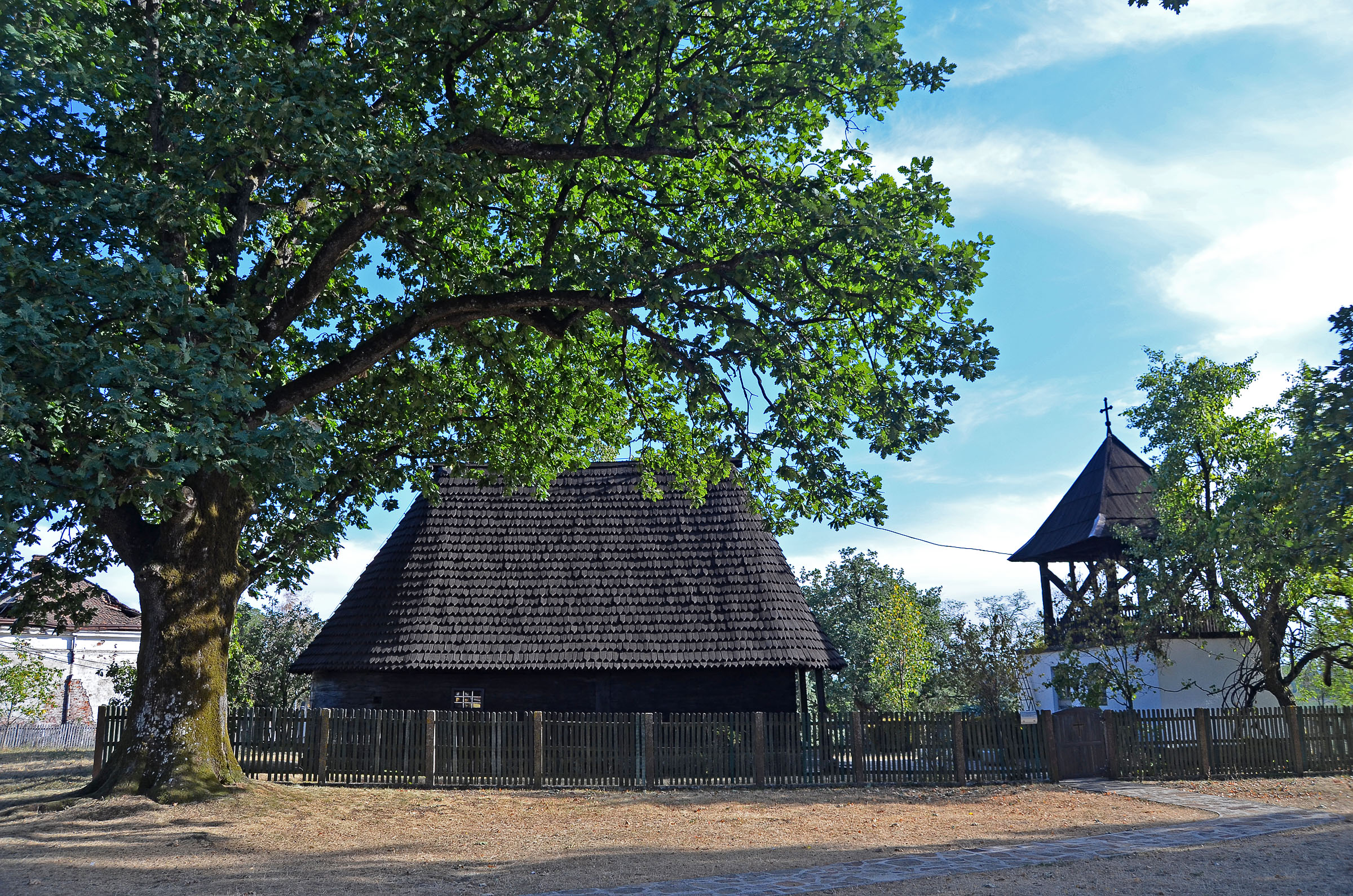
- Wooden church and bell tower in Ljutovnica, Serbia

- Location within Serbia
- Coordinates: 44.0833000°N 20.4333000°E
- Country: Serbia
- District: Moravica District
- Municipality: Gornji Milanovac
- Elevation: 1,526 ft (465 m)

Population (2002)
  - Total: 190
- Time zone: UTC+1 (CET)
  - Summer (DST): UTC+2 (CEST)
- Area code: 032
- Vehicle registration: GM

Ljutovnica is a village in the municipality of Gornji Milanovac, Serbia. According to the 2002 census, the village had a population of 190 people.

The village was active in the Serbian Revolution, being organized into the knežina (administrative unit) of Brusnica (Takovo) during the First Serbian Uprising (1804–13). Among notable local revolutionaries were Ranko who flew the barjak (war-flag) at the Takovo Meeting; Marko Radosavljević; armed priest Mijailo who was impaled.

The village features a wooden church. The locals talk about a Chetnik refuge that hid in it during World War 2.
