= Russian Orthodox Church Outside of Russia =

Semi-autonomous part of the Russian Orthodox Church

Russian Orthodox Church Outside of Russia Ру́сская Правосла́вная Це́рковь Заграни́цей
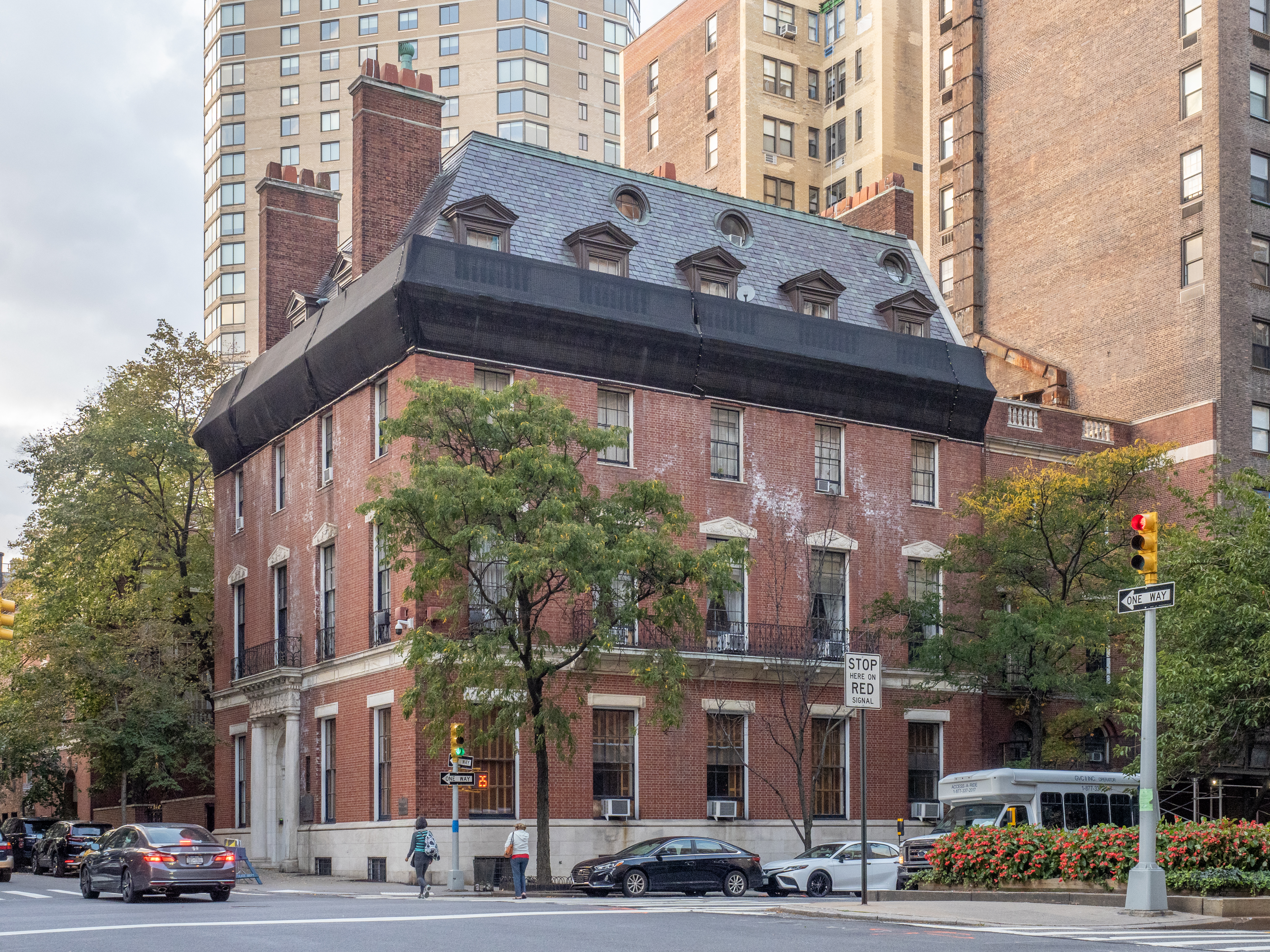
- ROCOR headquarters, 75 E 93rd St, New York
- Abbreviation: ROCOR
- Classification: Eastern Orthodox
- Primate: Patriarch of Moscow & All Rus' Kirill
- First Hierarch: Metropolitan Nicholas (Olhovsky)
- Language: Church Slavonic (worship), Russian (preaching), vernacular languages
- Headquarters: New York City, NY
- Territory: Americas; Europe; Australia; New Zealand
- Founder: Anthony (Khrapovitsky); Anastasius (Gribanovsky); Eulogius (Georgiyevsky)
- Independence: 1920
- Reunion: 2007
- Recognition: Self-government church within Russian Orthodox Church
- Separations: Archdiocese of Russian Orthodox Churches in Western Europe (since 1926–1927), Northern American Metropolia (1927–1934 and since 1946, now Orthodox Church in America), Holy Orthodox Church in North America (since 1986), Russian Orthodox Free Church (since 1994–1995; now Russian Orthodox Autonomous Church), Russian Orthodox Church in Exile (since 2001), Russian True Orthodox Church (since 2001); Slavic Orthodox Vicariate of America (since 2019)
- Members: 23,727 in the U.S. (9,879 regular church attendees (Note: These numbers reflect only the supposed US adherents. They do not take into account ROCOR's numbers in Australia, Germany, and Indonesia.)) (Note: The number of adherents given in the Atlas of American Orthodox Christian Churches is defined as "individual full members" with the addition of their children. It also includes an estimate of how many are not members but regularly participate in parish life. Regular attendees includes only those who regularly attend church and regularly participate in church life.)
- Official website: www.synod.com

The Russian Orthodox Church Outside of Russia (Russian: Ру́сская Правосла́вная Це́рковь Заграни́цей, romanized: Rússkaya Pravoslávnaya Tsérkov Zagranítsey, lit. 'Russian Orthodox Church Abroad'), also called Russian Orthodox Church Outside Russia or ROCOR, or Russian Orthodox Church Abroad (ROCA), is a semi-autonomous part of the Russian Orthodox Church (Moscow Patriarchate). Currently, the position of First-Hierarch of the ROCOR is occupied by Metropolitan Nicholas (Olhovsky).

The ROCOR was established in the early 1920s as a de facto independent ecclesiastical jurisdiction of Eastern Orthodoxy, initially due to lack of regular liaison between the central church authority in Moscow and some bishops due to their voluntary exile after the Russian Civil War. These bishops migrated with other Russians to Western European cities and nations, including Paris and other parts of France, and to the United States and other western countries. Later these bishops rejected the Moscow Patriarchate's unconditional political loyalty to the Bolshevik regime in the USSR. This loyalty was formally promulgated by the Declaration of 20 July 1927 of Metropolitan Sergius (Stragorodsky), deputy Patriarchal locum tenens. Metropolitan Anthony (Khrapovitsky), of Kiev and Galicia, was the founding First-Hierarch of the ROCOR.

After 80 years of separation followed by the fall of the Soviet Union, on 17 May 2007, the Russian Orthodox Church Outside Russia officially signed the Act of Canonical Communion with the Moscow Patriarchate, restoring the canonical link between the churches.

The ROCOR jurisdiction has around 400 parishes worldwide and an estimated membership of more than 400,000 people. Of these, 199 parishes and 10 monasteries are in the United States; they have 23,727 adherents and around 9,879 regular church attendees. The ROCOR has 13 hierarchs, with male and female monasteries in the United States, Canada, and the Americas; Australia, New Zealand, and Western Europe.

== History ==
=== Precursors and early history ===
In May 1919, during the Russian Revolution, the White military forces under General Anton Denikin were achieving the apex of their military success. In the Russian city of Stavropol, then controlled by the White Army, a group of Russian bishops organized an ecclesiastical administration body, the Temporary Higher Church Administration in Southeastern Russia (Russian: Временное высшее церковное управление на Юго-Востоке России). On 7 November (20 November) 1920, Tikhon, Patriarch of Moscow, his Synod, and the Supreme Church Council in Moscow issued a joint resolution, No. 362, instructing all Russian Orthodox Christian bishops, should they be unable to maintain liaison with the Supreme Church Administration in Moscow, to seek protection and guidance by organizing among themselves. The resolution was interpreted as effectively legitimizing the Temporary Higher Church Administration, and served as the legal basis for the eventual establishment of a completely independent church body.

In November 1920, after the final defeat of the Russian Army in South Russia, a number of Russian bishops evacuated from Crimea to Constantinople, then occupied by British, French, and Italian forces. After learning that General Pyotr Wrangel intended to keep his army, they likewise decided to keep the Russian ecclesiastical organization as a separate entity abroad. The Temporary Church Authority met on 19 November 1920 aboard the ship Grand Duke Alexander Mikhailovich (Russian: «Великий князь Александр Михайлович»), presided over by Metropolitan Antony (Khrapovitsky). Metropolitan Antony and Bishop Benjamin (Fedchenkov) were appointed to examine the canonicity of the organization. On 2 December 1920, they received permission from Metropolitan Dorotheos of Prousa, Locum Tenens of the Ecumenical Patriarchate of Constantinople, to establish "for the purpose of the service of the population [...] and to oversee the ecclesiastic life of Russian colonies in Orthodox countries a temporary committee (epitropia) under the authority of the Ecumenical Patriarchate"; the committee was called the Temporary Higher Church Administration Abroad (THCAA).

=== In Karlovci ===
On 14 February 1921, Metropolitan Antony (Khrapovitsky) settled in the town of Sremski Karlovci, Serbia (then within the Kingdom of Yugoslavia), where he was given the palace of former Patriarchs of Karlovci (the Patriarchate of Karlovci had been abolished in 1920). In the next months, at the invitation of Patriarch Dimitrije of Serbia, the other eight bishops of the THCAA, including Anastasius (Gribanovsky) and Benjamin (Fedchenkov), as well as numerous priests and monks, relocated to Serbia. On 31 August 1921, the Council of Bishops of the Serbian Church passed a resolution, effective from 3 October, recognizing the THCAA as an administratively independent jurisdiction for exiled Russian clergy outside the Kingdom of Yugoslavia (SHS), as well as for those Russian clergy in the Kingdom who were not in parish or state educational service. The THCAA jurisdiction was subsequently extended to hearing divorce cases of exiled Russians.

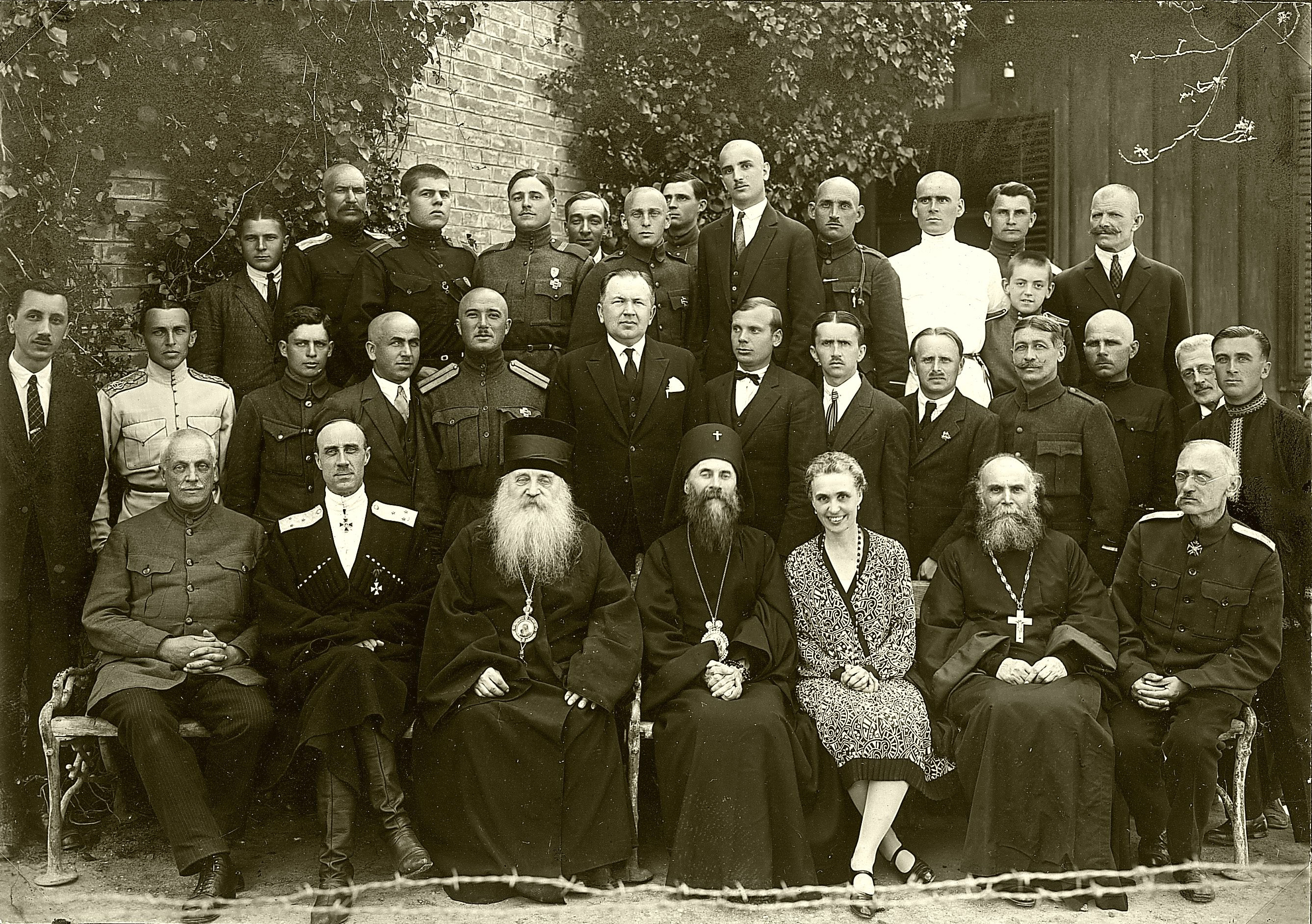
Sergey Paleolog, General Pyotr Wrangel, Metropolitan Anthony (Khrapovitsky), Archbishop Anastasius (Gribanovsky), Olga Wrangel and Archpriest Peter Belovidov in Topčider, Belgrade. Easter, April 1927

With the agreement of Patriarch Dimitrije of Serbia, between 21 November and 2 December 1921, the "General assembly of representatives of the Russian Church abroad" (Russian: Всезаграничное Русское Церковное Собрание) took place in Sremski Karlovci. It was later renamed as the "First All-Diaspora Council" and was presided over by Metropolitan Anthony.

The council established the "Supreme Ecclesiastic Administration Abroad" (SEAA), composed of a patriarchal Locum Tenens, a Synod of Bishops, and a Church Council. The Council decided to appoint Metropolitan Anthony as the Locum Tenens, but he declined to accept the position without permission from Moscow, and instead identified as the President of the SEAA. The Council adopted a number of resolutions and appeals (missives), with the two most notable ones being addressed to the flock of the Russian Orthodox Church "in diaspora and exile" («Чадам Русской Православной Церкви, в рассеянии и изгнании сущим») and to the 1922 International Conference in Genoa. The former, adopted with a majority of votes (but not unanimously, Metropolitan Eulogius Georgiyevsky being the most prominent critic of such specific political declarations), expressly proclaimed a political goal of restoring monarchy in Russia with a tsar from the House of Romanov. The appeal to the Genoa Conference, which was published in 1922, called on the world powers to intervene and "help banish Bolshevism" from Russia. The majority of the Council members secretly decided to request that Grand Duke Nicholas Nikolaevich head up the Russian monarchist movement in exile. (But, pursuant to the laws of the Russian Empire, the seniormost surviving male member of the Romanovs was Kirill Vladimirovich, and in August 1924 he proclaimed himself as the Russian Emperor in exile.)

Patriarch Tikhon addressed a decree of 5 May 1922 to Metropolitan Eulogius Georgiyevsky, abolishing the SEAA and declaring the political decisions of the Karlovci Council to be against the position of the Russian Church. Tikhon appointed Metropolitan Eulogius as administrator for the "Russian orthodox churches abroad". Meeting in Sremski Karlovci on 2 September 1922, pursuant to Tikhon's decree, the Council of Bishops abolished the SEAA, in its place forming the Temporary Holy Synod of Bishops of the Russian Orthodox Church Outside Russia, with Metropolitan Anthony as its head by virtue of seniority. This Synod exercised direct authority over Russian parishes in the Balkans, the Middle East, and the Far East.

In North America, however, a conflict developed among bishops who did not recognize the authority of the Synod, led by Metropolitan Platon (Rozhdestvensky); this group formed the American Metropolia, the predecessor to the OCA. In Western Europe, Metropolitan Eulogius (Georgievsky), based in Paris from late 1922, did likewise, stating that the Synod was merely "a moral authority". Metropolitan Eulogius later broke off from the ROC, and in February 1931 joined the Ecumenical Patriarchate. This seminal act formed the Patriarchal Exarchate for Orthodox Parishes of Russian Tradition in Western Europe.

On 5 September 1927, the Council of Bishops in Sremski Karlovci, presided over by Metropolitan Anthony, decreed a formal break of liaison with the "Moscow church authority". They rejected a demand by Metropolitan Sergius (Stragorodsky) of Nizhny Novgorod, who was acting on behalf of Locum Tenens (Metropolitan Peter of Krutitsy, imprisoned then in the Soviet Gulag, where he later died), to declare political loyalty to the Soviet authorities. The Council of Bishops said that the church administration in Moscow, headed by Metropolitan Sergius (Stragorodsky), was "enslaved by the godless Soviet power that has deprived it of freedom in its expression of will and canonical governance of the Church."

While rejecting both the Bolsheviks and the de facto head of the Russian Orthodox Church, Metropolitan Sergius (who in 1943 would be elected as Patriarch), the ROCOR continued to nominally recognize the authority of the imprisoned Metropolitan Peter of Krutitsy. On September 9, the Council stated: "The part of the Russian Church that finds itself abroad considers itself an inseparable, spiritually united branch of the great Russian Church. It doesn't separate itself from its Mother Church and doesn't consider itself autocephalous." Meanwhile, inside the USSR, Metropolitan Sergius' Declaration caused a schism among the flock of the patriarch's church. Many dissenting believers broke ties with Metropolitan Sergius.

On 22 June 1934, Metropolitan Sergius and his Synod in Moscow passed judgment on Metropolitan Anthony and his Synod, declaring them to be suspended. Metropolitan Anthony refused to recognize this decision, claiming that it was made under political pressure from Soviet authorities and that Metropolitan Sergius had illegally usurped the position of Locum Tenens. He was supported in this by the Patriarch Varnava of Serbia, who continued to maintain communion with the ROCOR Synod. However, Patriarch Varnava also attempted to mediate between the Karlovci Synod and Metropolitan Sergius in Moscow, and to find a canonically legitimate way to settle the dispute. In early 1934, he had sent a letter to Sergius proposing that the Karlovci bishops be transferred to the jurisdiction of the Serbian Church; the proposal was rejected by Sergius. Sergius continued to demand that all Russian clergy outside the USSR pledge loyalty to the Soviet authorities. Patriarch Varnava's attempts in the mid-1930s to reconcile the rival exile Russian jurisdictions were likewise unsuccessful.

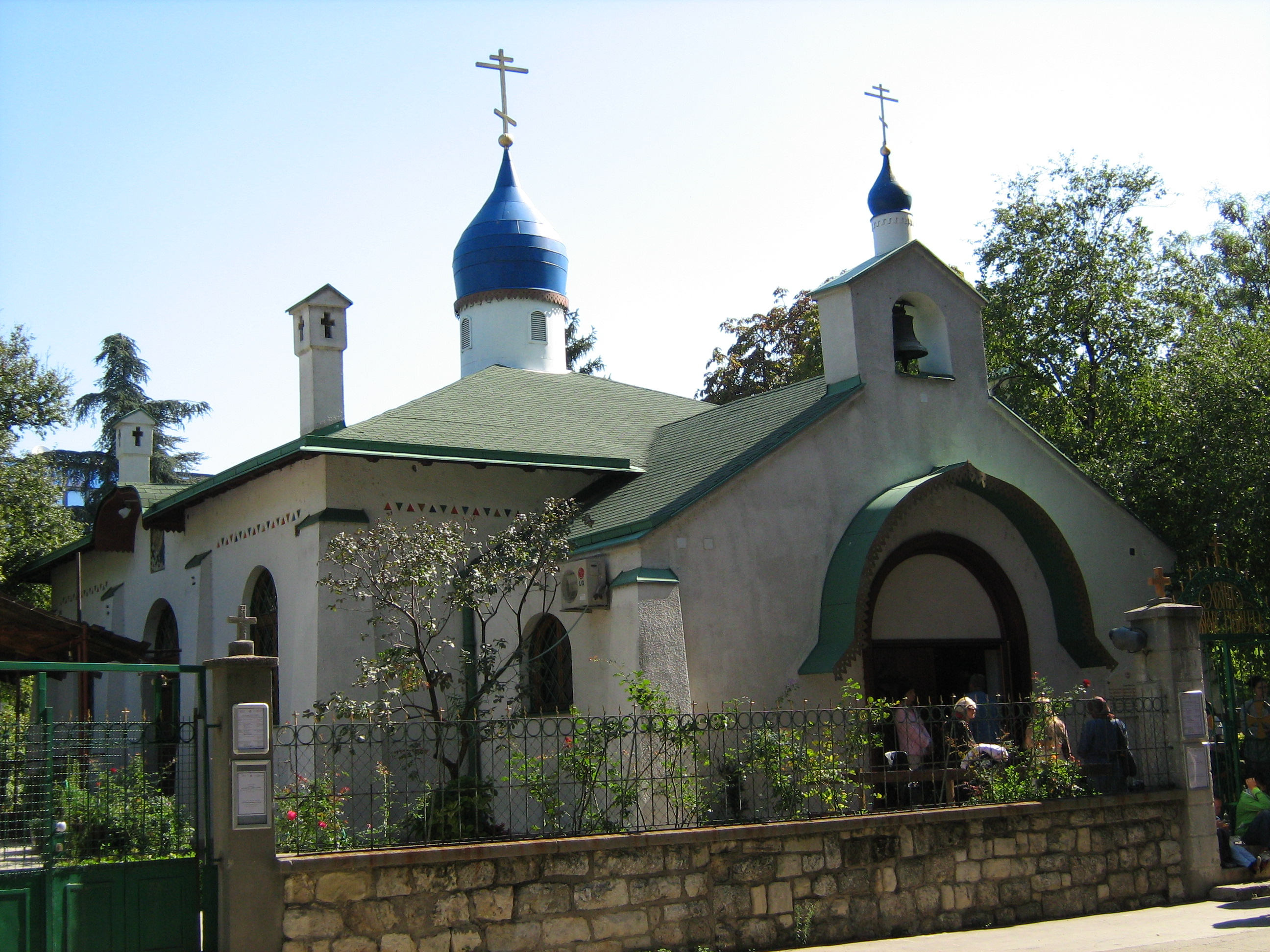
Russian church of Holy Trinity in Belgrade, Serbia, built in 1924 by Russian émigrés

Metropolitan Anthony (Khrapovitsky) died in 1936. He was succeeded by Anastasius (Gribanovsky).

After the deaths of Metropolitan Anthony in August 1936 and Metropolitan Peter of Krutitsy in October 1937 (albeit falsely reported a year prior), the Russian bishops in exile held the Second All-Diaspora Council, first in Belgrade, then in Sremski Karlovci, in August 1938. The council was presided over by Metropolitan Anastasius (Gribanovsky), and was attended by 12 other exiled Russian bishops (at least double the number of Orthodox (Patriarchal) bishops who were allowed to serve within the USSR), 26 priests, and 58 laypersons. The council confirmed the leading role of the church and its bishops in Russian émigré organizations, and adopted two missives: to Russians in the USSR (Russian: «К Русскому народу в Отечестве страждущему») and to the Russian flock in diaspora (Russian: «К Русской пастве в рассеянии сущей»).

From February 1938, Germany's authorities demanded that all the Russian clergy in the territories controlled by Germany be under the Karlovci jurisdiction (as opposed to that of Paris-based Eulogius). They insisted that an ethnic German, Seraphim Lade, be put in charge of the Orthodox diocese of Berlin.

=== World War II and post-war period ===
Timeline of the separations of the ROCOR and some other churches from the ROC

The relationship between members of the ROCOR and the Nazis in the run-up to and during World War II has been an issue addressed by both the church and its critics. Metropolitan Anastassy wrote a letter to Adolf Hitler in 1938, thanking him for his aid to the Russian Diaspora in allowing them to build a Russian Orthodox Cathedral in Berlin and praising his patriotism. This has been defended as an act that occurred when the Metropolitan and others in the church knew "little ... of the inner workings of the Third Reich." At the ROCOR Second Church History Conference in 2002, a paper said that "the attempt of the Nazi leadership to divide the church into separate and even inimical church formations was met with internal church opposition."

Meanwhile, the USSR leadership's policies towards religion in general, as well as policy towards the Moscow Patriarchate's jurisdiction in the USSR, changed significantly. In early September 1943, Joseph Stalin met at the Kremlin with a group of three surviving ROC metropolitans headed by Sergius (Stragorodsky). He allowed the Moscow Patriarchate to convene a council and elect a Patriarch, open theological schools, and reopen a few previously closed major monasteries and some churches (said institutions had been reopened in territory occupied by Germany). The Soviet government decisively sided with the Moscow Patriarchate, while the so-called Obnovlentsi ("Renovationists", i.e. the modernist, pro-Soviet current in the ROC), previously favored by the authorities, were sidelined; their proponents were disappeared shortly after. These developments did not change the mutual rejection between the Moscow Patriarchate and the ROCOR leaderships.

Days after the election in September 1943 of Sergius (Stragorodsky) as Patriarch in Moscow, Metropolitan Anastasius (Gribanovsky) made a statement against recognizing his election. Thus, the German authorities allowed the ROCOR Synod to hold a convention in Vienna, which took place on 21–26 October 1943. The Synod adopted a resolution declaring the election of Patriarch in Moscow to be uncanonical and hence invalid, and called on all Russian Orthodox faithful to fight against Communism.

On 8 September 1944, days before Belgrade was taken by the Red Army, on the attack from the East, Metropolitan Anastasius (Gribanovsky), along with his office and the other bishops, left Serbia for Vienna. A few months later, they moved to Munich; finally, in November 1950, they immigrated to the United States, together with numerous other Russian Orthodox refugees in the postwar period.

After the end of World War II, the Moscow Patriarchate was the globally dominant branch of Russian Orthodox Christianity. Countries whose Orthodox bishops had been part of the ROCOR in the interwar period, such as Yugoslavia, China, Bulgaria, and East Germany, were now within the USSR-led bloc, which rendered any activity by the ROCOR politically impossible. A number of ROCOR parishes and clergy, notably Eulogius (Georgiyevsky) (in a jurisdiction under the Ecumenical See since 1931), joined the Moscow Patriarchate, and some repatriated to the USSR.

On the other hand, the ROCOR, by 1950 headquartered in New York, the United States, rejected both the Communist regime in the Soviet Union and the Moscow Patriarchate. Its leaders condemned the Moscow Patriarchate as a Soviet Church run by the secret police.

Until well after World War II, most of the Orthodox Church properties in Palestine were controlled by leaders opposed to both the Soviet rule and the Moscow Patriarchate, i.e. mainly within the ROCOR.

When Israel became a state in 1948, it transferred all of the property under the control of the ROCOR within its borders to the Soviet-dominated Russian Orthodox Church in appreciation for Moscow's support of the Jewish state (this support was short-lived). The ROCOR maintained control over churches and properties in the Jordanian-ruled West Bank until the late 1980s.

In January 1951, the Soviets reopened the Russian Palestine Society under the direction of Communist Party agents from Moscow, and replaced Archimandrite Vladimir with Ignaty Polikarp, who had been trained by Communists. They attracted numerous Christian Arabs to the ROC who had Communist sympathies. The members of other branches of Orthodoxy refused to associate with the Soviet-led ROC in Palestine.

=== Cold War period ===
The third First-Hierarch of the ROCOR was Philaret (Voznesensky), who served from 1964 until his death in 1985.

After the declaration of Metropolitan Sergius of 1927, there were a range of opinions regarding the Moscow Patriarchate within ROCOR. There was a general belief in ROCOR that the Soviet government was manipulating the Moscow Patriarchate to one extent or another, and that under such circumstances administrative ties were impossible. There were also official statements made that the elections of the patriarchs of Moscow which occurred after 1927 were invalid because they were not conducted freely (without the interference of the Soviets) or with the participation of the entire Russian Church.

Historically, ROCOR has always affirmed that it was an inseparable part of the Russian Church, and that its autonomous status was only temporary, based upon Ukaz 362, until such time as the domination of the Soviet government over the affairs of the church should cease:

"The Russian Orthodox Church Outside Russia is an indissoluble part of the Russian Orthodox Church, and for the time until the extermination in Russia of the atheist government, is self-governing on conciliar principles in accordance with the resolution of the Patriarch, the Most Holy Synod, and the Highest Church Council [Sobor] of the Russian Church dated 7/20 November 1920, No. 362."

Similarly, Metropolitan Anastassy (Gribanovsky) wrote in his last will and testament:

"As regards the Moscow Patriarchate and its hierarchs, then, so long as they continue in close, active and benevolent cooperation with the Soviet Government, which openly professes its complete godlessness and strives to implant atheism in the entire Russian nation, then the Church Abroad, maintaining Her purity, must not have any canonical, liturgical or even simply external communion with them whatsoever, leaving each one of them at the same time to the final judgment of the Council (Sobor) of the future free Russian Church."

The Catacomb Church had been a significant part of the Russian Church prior to the relaxation of the suppression of the church on the part of Stalin, in 1943. Most of those in the ROCOR were White émigrés who had left Russia well before World War II. They were unaware of the changes that had occurred immediately after World War II—most significantly that with the election of Patriarch Alexei I in 1945, after which most of the Catacomb Church was reconciled with the Moscow Patriarchate. By the 1970s, due to this reconciliation, as well as to continued persecution by the Soviets, there was very little left of the Catacomb Church. Alexander Solzhenitsyn made this point in a letter to the 1974 All-Diaspora Sobor of the ROCOR, in which he stated that ROCOR should not "show solidarity with a mysterious, sinless, but also bodiless catacomb."

Through its publications, ROCOR expressed support for efforts to resist communism during the Vietnam War.

Vitaly (Ustinov) served as the fourth First-Hierarch from 1985 until his retirement in 2001. After the end of the Soviet Union in December 1991, ROCOR continued to maintain its administrative independence from the Russian Orthodox Church (Moscow Patriarchate). In May 1990, months prior to the complete disintegration of the USSR, the ROCOR decided to establish new, "Free Russian" parishes in the USSR, and to consecrate bishops to oversee such parishes.

=== Post-Soviet period ===
In 1997 Patriarch of Moscow Alexei II attempted to visit a ROCOR-held monastery in Hebron with Yasser Arafat. "The Moscow-based church has enjoyed a close relationship with Arafat since his guerrilla fighter days." The ROCOR clergy refused to allow Arafat and the patriarch to enter the church, holding that Alexei had no legitimate authority. Two weeks later police officers of the Palestinian Authority arrived; they evicted the ROCOR clergy and turned the property over to the ROC.

Alexei made another visit in early January 2000 to meet with Arafat, asking "for help in recovering church properties" as part of a "worldwide campaign to recover properties lost to churches that split off during the Communist era". Later that month the Palestinian Authority again acted to evict ROCOR clergy, this time from the 3-acre (12,000 m^{2}) Monastery of Abraham's Oak in Hebron.

Metropolitan Vitaly (Ustinov) in 2001 was succeeded by the fifth First-Hierarch of the ROCOR, Metropolitan Laurus (Škurla), who oversaw the reconciliation with the Russian Orthodox Church in 2007. After the death of Laurus in 2008, he was succeeded by the sixth First-Hierarch, Metropolitan Hilarion (Kapral). Metropolitan Hilarion (Kapral) died in May 2022.

== Reconciliation with the Moscow Patriarchate ==
In 2000 Metropolitan Laurus became the First Hierarch of the ROCOR; he expressed interest in the idea of reunification. At the time ROCOR insisted that the Moscow Patriarchate address the murders of Tsar Nicholas II and his family in 1918 by the Bolsheviks. The ROCOR accused the leadership of the ROC as being submissive to the Russian government and were also alarmed by their ties with other denominations of Christianity, especially Catholicism.

At the jubilee Council of Bishops in 2000, the Russian Orthodox Church canonized Tsar Nicholas and his family, along with more than 1,000 martyrs and confessors. The Council also enacted a document on relations between the Church and the secular authorities, censoring servility and complaisance. They also rejected the idea of any connection between Eastern Orthodoxy and Catholicism.

=== ROCOR(V) ===
The possibility of rapprochement led to a minor schism from the ROCOR in 2001.

The fourth First-Hierarch of the ROCOR, Metropolitan Vitaly (Ustinov), retired in 2001, citing health reasons. After the election of his successor, Metropolitan Laurus (Škurla), in October 2001, Vitaly released an epistle denouncing the appointment and asserting his continuing primacy. A number of ROCOR clergy and parishioners who opposed to reunification with the Moscow Patriarchate, including the suspended Bishop Varnava (Prokofieff) of Cannes, formed a new church administration around Metropolitan Vitaly, renaming themselves as the "Russian Orthodox Church in Exile" (ROCiE) then to "Russian Orthodox Church Outside of Russia"; in common parlance this group is called ROCOR-Vitaly or ROCOR(V) (Russian: РПЦЗ(В)).

The episcopate of the ROCOR asserted that Metropolitan Vitaly was being held hostage by schismatics who took advantage of his failing health and used his name to produce a schism. They claimed that Metropolitan Vitaly's entourage forged his signature on epistles and documents. One of the churches which splintered from the ROCOR(V) is the Russian True Orthodox Church which was formed in 2002.

=== Reconciliation talks ===
In 2003 President Vladimir Putin of Russia met with Metropolitan Laurus in New York. In May 2004, Metropolitan Laurus, the Primate of the ROCOR, visited Russia participating in several joint services. In June 2004, a contingent of ROCOR clergy met with Patriarch Alexey II.

After a series of six reconciliation meetings, the ROCOR and the Patriarchate of Moscow, on June 21, 2005, simultaneously announced that rapprochement talks were leading toward the resumption of full relations between the ROCOR and the Patriarchate of Moscow. They said that the ROCOR would be given autonomous status.

While Patriarch Alexy said that the ROCOR would keep its property and fiscal independence, and that its autonomy would not change "in the foreseeable future", he added that "Maybe this will change in decades and there will be some new wishes. But today we have enough concerns and will not make guesses."

On May 12, 2006, the general congress of the ROCOR confirmed its willingness to reunite with the Russian Orthodox Church. The latter hailed this resolution as:

"an important step toward restoring full unity between the Moscow Patriarchate and the part of the Russian emigration that was isolated from it as a result of the revolution, the civil war in Russia, and the ensuing impious persecution against the Orthodox Church."

In September 2006, the ROCOR Synod of Bishops approved the text of the document worked out by the commissions, an Act of Canonical Communion. In October 2006, the commissions met again to propose procedures and a time for signing the document. The Act of Canonical Communion went into effect upon its confirmation by the Holy Synod of the Russian Orthodox Church; the Act is based on a previous resolution of the Holy Council of Bishops of the Russian Orthodox Church, On the Relationship with the Russian Orthodox Church Outside of Russia, held in Moscow on 3–8 October 2004, as well on the Synod of Bishops of the ROCOR's resolution Regarding the Act on Canonical Communion take at the Council of Bishops of the Russian Orthodox Church Outside Russia held in San Francisco on 15–19 May 2006.

=== Signing of the Act of Canonical Communion ===
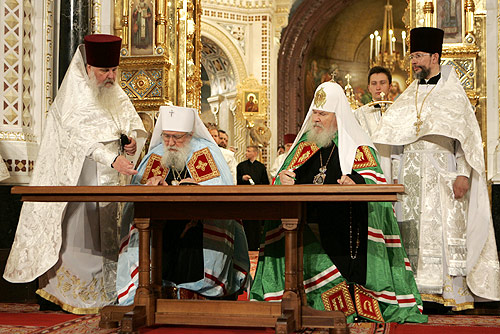
Solemn signing of the Act of Canonical Communion in the Cathedral of Christ the Savior, Moscow. Left to right: Archpriest Alexander Lebedev, First-Hierarch of the ROCOR Metropolitan Laurus, Patriarch Alexy II of Moscow and All Russia, Protopriest Nikolai Balashov. 17 May 2007

On December 28, 2006, the leaders officially announced that the Act of Canonical Communion would be signed. The signing took place on May 17, 2007, followed immediately by a full restoration of communion with the Moscow Patriarchate. It was celebrated by a Divine Liturgy at the Cathedral of Christ the Saviour in Moscow, at which the Patriarch of Moscow and All Russia Alexius II and the First-Hierarch of ROCOR concelebrated for the first time in history.

On 17 May 2007, at 9:15 a.m., Metropolitan Laurus was greeted at the cathedral by a special peal of the bells, and shortly thereafter, Patriarch Alexey II entered. After the Patriarch read the prayer for the unity of the Russian Church, the Act of Canonical Communion was read aloud, and two copies were each signed by both Metropolitan Laurus and Patriarch Alexey II. The two hierarchs exchanged the "kiss of peace", after which they and the entire Russian Church sang "God Grant You Many Years". Following this, the Divine Liturgy of the Feast of the Ascension of Our Lord began, culminating with the entirety of the bishops of both ROCOR and MP partaking of the Eucharist.

Present at all of this was Russian President Vladimir Putin, who was thanked by Patriarch Alexey for helping to facilitate the reconciliation. Putin addressed the audience of Orthodox Christians, visitors, clergy, and press, saying,

"The split in the church was caused by an extremely deep political split within Russian society itself. We have realized that national revival and development in Russia are impossible without reliance on the historical and spiritual experience of our people. We understand well, and value, the power of pastoral words which unite the people of Russia. That is why restoring the unity of the church serves our common goals."

The Hierarchs of the Russian Church Abroad served again with the Patriarch on 19 May, in the consecration of the Church of the New Martyrs in Butovo firing range. They had laid the cornerstone of the church in 2004 during their initial visit.

President Vladimir Putin gave a reception at the Kremlin to celebrate the reunification. In attendance were Patriarch Alexy II of Moscow and All Russia and members of the Holy Synod for the Russian Orthodox Church; Metropolitan Laurus for the Russian Orthodox Church Outside Russia; presidential chief of staff Sergei Sobyanin, First Deputy Prime Minister Dmitry Medvedev, and Minister of Culture and Mass Communications Aleksandr Sokolov. Before the reception, participants posed for photographs at the Dormition Cathedral.

==== ROCA-PSCA ====
After the signing of the Act in 2007, there was a minor schism in the ROCOR. Critics of the reunification continue to argue that "the hierarchy in Moscow still has not properly addressed the issue of KGB infiltration of the church hierarchy during the Soviet period."

However, one of the Ukrainian priests; Metropolitan Mikhail "Agathangel" Ivanovich Pashkovsky of Odessa and Tauria, followed by some ROCOR parishes in Ukraine, refused to enter the jurisdiction of the Ukrainian Orthodox Church (Moscow Patriarchate). Agathangel was suspended for disobedience by an extraordinary session of the ROCOR synod in June 2007.

Despite censure, Agathangel persisted with the support of some ROCOR parishes inside and outside Ukraine which had also refused to submit to the Act of Canonical Communion. Agafangel then finalized the schism from the ROCOR by ordaining two bishops on 7 December 2007, Andronik (Kotrliaroff) as Bishop of Richmond Hill and New York, and Sophronius (Musienko) as Bishop of Saint Petersburg and Northern Russia. The church headed by Agathangel is known as Russian Orthodox Church Abroad - Provisional Supreme Church Authority (ROCA-PSCA), or in common parlance ROCOR-Agathangel or ROCOR(A).

=== Post-reconciliation ===
In general ROCOR has eschewed comment on Russian politics and the increasingly close ties between the Moscow Patriarchate and the Russian Government under Vladimir Putin. The synod has neither condemned, nor, unlike its mother church, endorsed the Russian invasion of Ukraine, instead emphasizing humanitarian concerns while expressing support for the Ukrainian Orthodox Church (Moscow Patriarchate). In an exception, Bishop Irenei of London and Western Europe issued a critical statement in 2023 stating in part; "This is not a political question for us but a religious one. We stand against all war, and this war in particular, as we stand also against bloodshed, and against persecution in all cases—whoever may be their perpetrators." Another exception occurred in 2025 when the Synod issued a statement strongly criticizing the Russian government's efforts to rehabilitate the record of the communist regime under the USSR and whitewash the crimes of its leaders.

== Structure ==
The ROCOR is headed by the First-Hierarch of the ROCOR (Protohierarch), primate of the whole ROCOR, head of the ROCOR Holy Synod, and bishop of the Russian Orthodox Eparchy of Eastern America and New York. The Holy Synod also has a vice-president. The "supreme authority of the ecclesiastical legislative, administrative, judicial and executive organ" of the ROCOR is the Council of Bishops of the ROCOR which is convened about every two years.

The ROCOR is divided into dioceses, themselves in some cases subdivided into smaller dioceses.

The division into dioceses is as follows:

- United States:
  - Russian Orthodox Eparchy of Eastern America and New York
  - Diocese of San Francisco and Western America
  - Diocese of Chicago and Middle America
- Diocese of Montreal and Canada:
- Diocese of Caracas and South America
- Russian Orthodox Diocese of Great Britain and Western Europe
- Diocese of Berlin and Germany
- Russian Orthodox Diocese of Sydney, Australia and New Zealand

ROCOR oversees and owns properties of the Russian Ecclesiastical Mission in Jerusalem, which acts as caretaker to three holy sites in East Jerusalem and Israel/Palestine, all of which are monasteries.

Maps have been published of the parishes and adherents in the USA on the basis of 2010 census data.

== Finance ==
The main source of income for the ROCOR central authority is lease of a part of the building that houses the headquarters of the ROCOR's Synod of Bishops situated at the intersection of East 93rd Street and Park Avenue to a private school, estimated in 2016 to generate about US$500,000; the ROCOR was said not to make any monetary contributions towards the ROC's budget.

== Western Rite in the ROCOR ==
There is a long history of the Western Rite in the ROCOR, although attitudes toward it have varied, and the number of Western Rite parishes is relatively small. St. Petroc Monastery in Tasmania is now under the oversight of Metropolitan Daniel of the Moscow Metropolitanate. The Benedictine Christ the Savior Monastery, founded in 1993 in Rhode Island and moved to Hamilton, Ontario, in 2008 has incorporated the Oratory of Our Lady of Glastonbury as its monastery chapel. The oratory had previously been a mission of the Antiochian Western Rite Vicariate in the Antiochian Orthodox Christian Archdiocese of North America, but since October 2007 has been a part of ROCOR. There are a few other parishes that either use the Western Rite exclusively or in part. An American parish, St Benedict of Nursia, in Oklahoma City, uses both the Western Rite and the Byzantine Rite.

In 2011, the ROCOR declared all of its Western Rite parishes to be a "vicariate", parallel to the Antiochian Western Rite Vicariate, and established a website.

On 10 July 2013, an extraordinary session of the Synod of Bishops of ROCOR removed Bishop Jerome of Manhattan and Fr Anthony Bondi from their positions in the vicariate; ordered a halt to all ordinations and a review of those recently conferred by Bishop Jerome; and decreed preparations be made for the assimilation of existing Western Rite communities to mainstream ROCOR liturgical practice.

== Notable churches ==
- St. Elizabeth's Church, Wiesbaden
- Russian Chapel, Bad Homburg
- Church of Saint Procopius of Ustyug, Hamburg
- Cathedral of the Nativity of the Most Holy Mother of God and the Holy Royal Martyrs, Chiswick
- Alexander Nevsky Church, Copenhagen
- Russian Church, Geneva
- Russian Orthodox Church, Vevey
- Russian Orthodox Church of Saint Job, Brussels
- St. Peter and Paul Church, Luxembourg
- Alexander Nevsky Cathedral, Howell, New Jersey
- Cathedral of St. John the Baptist (Washington, D.C.)
- St Nicholas Russian Orthodox Cathedral, Brisbane
- Holy Trinity Orthodox Church (Mebane, North Carolina)

== See also ==
- List of bishops of the Russian Orthodox Church Outside Russia
- Eastern Orthodox Church
- White émigré
- Theodore Jurewicz
- Ivan Ilyin
- Orthodox Church in America
- Assembly of Canonical Orthodox Bishops of the United States of America
- Assembly of Canonical Orthodox Bishops of Canada
- Assembly of Canonical Orthodox Bishops of Latin America
