= Christ the Saviour Monastery =

Monastery in Hamilton, Ontario, Canada

- Ukrainian: Свято-Успенська Святогірська Лавра
- Location within Ontario Christ the Saviour Monastery (Canada)
- Interactive map of the Christ the Saviour Monastery area

General information
- Location: Hamilton, Canada, Canada
- Coordinates: 43.0872°N 79.0387°W

Christ the Saviour Monastery, also known as Christminster, is a monastery of the Russian Orthodox Church Outside Russia (ROCOR) in Hamilton, Canada. The Benedictine monastery is an institution of Western Rite Orthodoxy.

== History ==
The monastery was founded by James Michael Patrick Deschene, O. S. B., a priest and literature teacher; Deschene died in 2020.

Founded in 1993 in Rhode Island in the United States, Christminster moved to Hamilton, Ontario, in 2008, incorporating the Oratory of Our Lady of Glastonbury as its monastery chapel. The oratory had previously been a mission of the Antiochian Western Rite Vicariate in the Antiochian Orthodox Christian Archdiocese of North America but since October 2007 has been within ROCOR.

The monastery celebrates a daily round of services in the oratory, including Sung Mass on Sunday mornings and Vespers and Benediction on Sunday evenings. The Mass is the Divine Liturgy of St Gregory, which is based on the Pre-Tridentine Mass.
