= Antony Khrapovitsky =

Russian Orthodox Bishop

Metropolitan Anthony
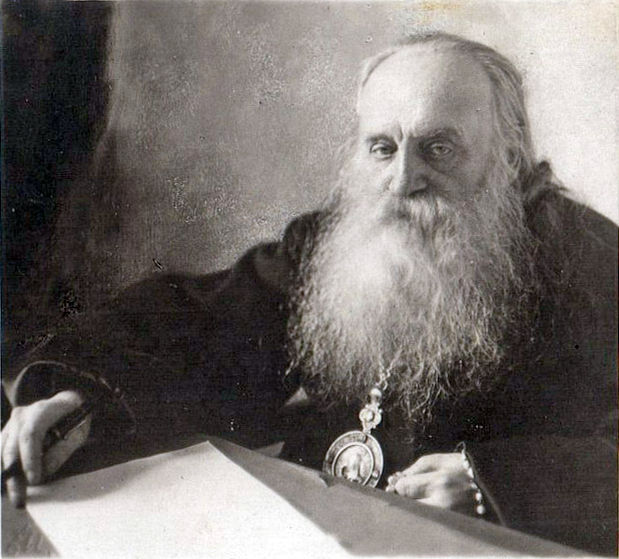
- Anthony in 1935
- Born: Aleksey Pavlovich Khrapovitsky; 29 March 1863; Novgorod Governorate, Russian Empire
- Died: 10 August 1936 (aged 73); Sremski Karlovci, Kingdom of Yugoslavia
- Occupations: Bishop of Russian Orthodox Church, and Russian Orthodox Church Outside Russia

Metropolitan Anthony (Russian: Митрополи́т Анто́ний, secular name Aleksey Pavlovich Khrapovitsky, Russian: Алексе́й Па́влович Храпови́цкий; 17 March (O.S.) 1863 – 10 August 1936) was a bishop of the Russian Orthodox Church in the Russian Empire, the Metropolitan of Kiev and Galicia, who after the defeat of Gen Pyotr Wrangel's White Army in South Russia in November 1920 emigrated and in 1921 settled down in Sremski Karlovci, Serbia. He, along with several other Russian bishops in exile, established an independent Russian church administration that sought to embrace all Russian Orthodox diaspora, known as the Russian Orthodox Church Outside Russia (ROCOR).

== Biography ==
=== In Russia ===
Aleksey Pavlovich Khrapovitsky was born in Russia on 17 March (O.S.) 1863 in Vatagino, Krestetsky Uyezd, Novgorod Governorate (now Okulovsky District, Novgorod Oblast), the son of a noble landowner and general.

After receiving secular secondary education at the 5th Petersburg Gymnasium, in a move that was at the time highly unusual for a young man of his pedigree and education, he studied at the Saint Petersburg Theological Academy, from which he graduated in 1885. In that year he became a monk and was given the name Antony in honor of St. Antony the Roman of Novgorod. In 1886 Antony taught at a theological academy in Kholm.

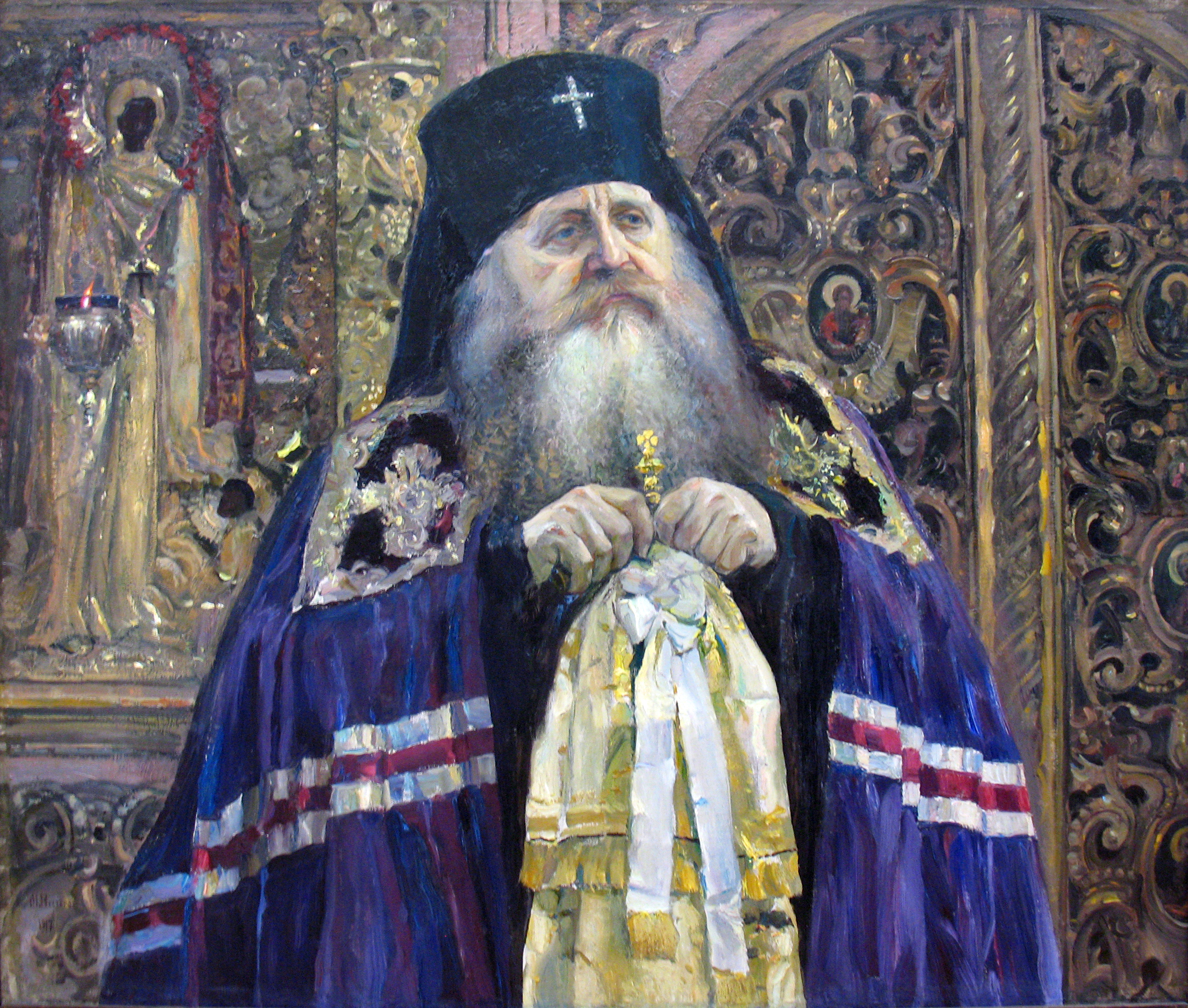
Archbishop Anthony. Canvas by Mikhail Nesterov. 1917

From 1887, he taught at the Academy where he had studied, and in 1890, he was appointed as rector of the St Petersburg seminary and raised to the rank of archimandrite. Later he was appointed rector of the Moscow Theological Academy in the Trinity Lavra of St. Sergius (1890–1894), then in 1895 he was transferred to the post of rector of the Kazan Theological Academy (until 1900).

On 7 September 1897, Archimandrite Anthony was consecrated Bishop of Cheboksary, vicar of the Kazan diocese.

On 14 July 1900, he was transferred to Ufa as Bishop of Ufa and Menzelinsk. As a significant part of the residents of the Ufa province were Muslims and Priestless Old Believers, Bishop Anthony worked on missionary outreach in his diocese.

In 1902 or 1903 together with Amvrosiy Bulgakov, head of Pochaiv Lavra, Antony travelled to Eastern Galicia and Bukovyna, visiting the Greek Catholic Cathedral of St. George in Lviv. During that period he corresponded with Greek Catholic metropolitan Andrey Sheptytsky, who strove to restore Byzantine Rite practices in his church.

On 22 April 1902, Bishop Anthony was appointed to the Volyn and Zhytomyr cathedra (based in Zhytomyr). In 1905, he was a co-founder of Zhytomyr's chapter of the Union of the Russian People.

In 1907, Bishop Anthony headed a commission charged with examining the Kiev Theological Academy. The commission's findings were unpopular with the Academy's staff, leading to Bishop Anthony's publication of "The Truth about the Kiev Theological Academy" and the resignation of its rector, Bishop Platon (Rozhdestvensky), the future head of the American Metropolia.

In 1906–1907, Bishop Anthony was member of the State Council and in 1912-1916 of the Holy Synod. He worked on the preparation for a Local Council of the Russian Church; he responded to the 1905 questionnaire of Russian bishops by calling for the restoration of the patriarchy and the reform of theological education and other reforms in Church administration.

On 19 May 1914, he was appointed as Bishop of Kharkov and Akhtyrka. After the February 1917 Revolution, he was forced to ask for retirement because of poor relations with the new authorities in his area and the discontent of certain members of his clergy. On 1 May 1917, he was retired and assigned to the Valaam Monastery, where he wrote his book "The Doctrine of Redemption", which later caused controversy among Orthodox theologians. In August 1917 he was again elected Archbishop of Kharkov by the Diocesan council of Kharkov.

=== During the Revolution ===
In 1917–1918, he took part in the Local Council of the Russian Church, at which he advocated restoring the patriarchate in the Church of Russia. After the decision on restoration of Russian patriarchy passed (three days after the Bolsheviks' capture of power in Petrograd), his candidacy for this eminent position received the largest number of votes — 159 (out of 309) — but on 5 November 1918, Metropolitan Tikhon of Moscow was elected by lot out of the three candidates, the weakest candidate of the vote. On 28 November, Archbishop Anthony was raised to the rank of metropolitan and on 7 December elected a member of the Holy Synod headed by Patriarch Tikhon.

In January 1918, Metropolitan Anthony was present at the All-Ukrainian Church Council in Kiev. He then fled the city before the Bolshevik invasion. Following the killing of Metropolitan Vladimir (Bogoyavlesky) of Kiev, Metropolitan Anthony was elected to the Kiev cathedra, and returned when the city was occupied by the Imperial German Army. However, his election was not approved by the authorities because of his opposition to Ukrainian autocephaly. Under Antony's leadership the Orthodox Church in Ukraine started using Ukrainian language on par with Russian in its administration.

In mid-December 1918, together with Archbishop Eulogius (Georgiyevsky) of Volyn, he was arrested by the Symon Petliura government. The hierarchs, along with Bishop Nicodemus (Krotkov) of Chigirin, were held at the Basilian monastery in Buchach. In the spring of 1919, when Buchach was taken by Polish forces, they were transferred to the Camaldolese monastery in Bielany. In the summer of 1919 they were freed through the work of the French diplomatic mission at the request of metropolitan Andrey Sheptytsky, who for some time hosted Antony in his residence. In September 1919, he left for Kuban, then returned to Kiev, which was held by White forces of General Denikin. After Kiev was retaken by Bolsheviks in November 1919, he left for Yekaterinodar, where he was elected as president of the Temporary Higher Church Authority of South-East Russia. After the defeat of the Denikin army, in March 1920 he left for Greece, where he received the support of Archbishop Meletius (Metaxakis) of Athens. In September 1920, he was invited by Gen Pyotr Wrangel to Crimea, then controlled by Wrangel's anti-Bolshevik forces. After the latter's defeat in November 1920, Antony left Russia for good.

=== In exile ===
Between November 1920 and February 1921, Metropolitan Anthony was in Constantinople, then occupied by British, French and Italian forces. At first he decided that the Temporary Church Authority should be abolished and pastoral care for displaced Russians handed over to other local churches. However, after learning of the decision of Gen Wrangel to keep his army, Metropolitan Anthony decided to keep the Church organization abroad as well. The Temporary Authority met on 19 November 1920, aboard the ship Great Prince Alexader Mikhailovich, presided over by Metropolitan Anthony. He and Bishop Benjamin (Fedchenkov) were appointed to examine the canonicity of the organization. On 2 December 1920, they received permission from Metropolitan Dorotheos of Prussia, Locum Tenens of the Ecumenical Patriarchate of Constantinople, to establish "for the purpose of the service of the population [...] and to oversee the ecclesiastic life of Russian colonies in Orthodox countries a temporary committee (epitropia) under the authority of the Ecumenical Patriarchate"; the committee was called the Temporary Higher Church Administration Abroad (THCAA).

On 14 February 1921, Metropolitan Anthony settled down in Sremski Karlovci, where he was given the palace of former Patriarchs of Karlovci (the Patriarchate of Karlovci had been abolished in 1920 when it was united to the "reformed" Serbian Orthodox Church). In the course of the subsequent few months, at the invitation of Patriarch Dimitrije of Serbia, the other eight bishops of the THCAA, including Anastasius (Gribanovsky) and Benjamin (Fedchenkov), as well as numerous priests and monks, relocated to Serbia. On 31 August 1921, the Council of Bishops of the Serbian Church recognised the THCAA as an administratively independent jurisdiction over the Russian exiled clergy outside the Kingdom of SHS as well as those Russian clergy in the Kingdom of SHS who were not in parish or state educational service; the THCAA jurisdiction would also extend to marital and divorce disputes of the exiled Russians.

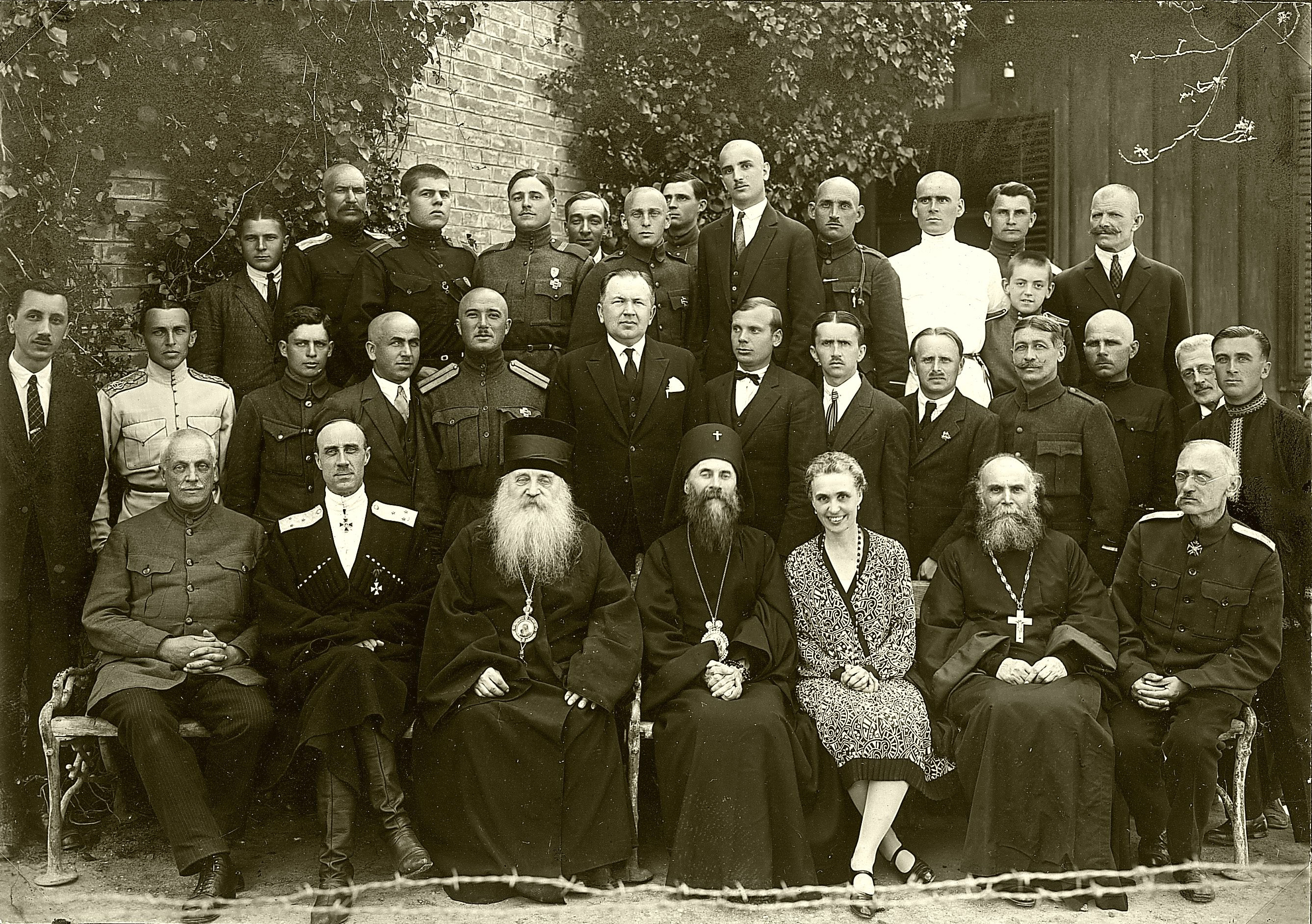
Gen Pyotr Wrangel, chairman of the Russian All-Military Union (second left), and Met Anthony in Dedinje, Belgrade, on Easter, April 1927

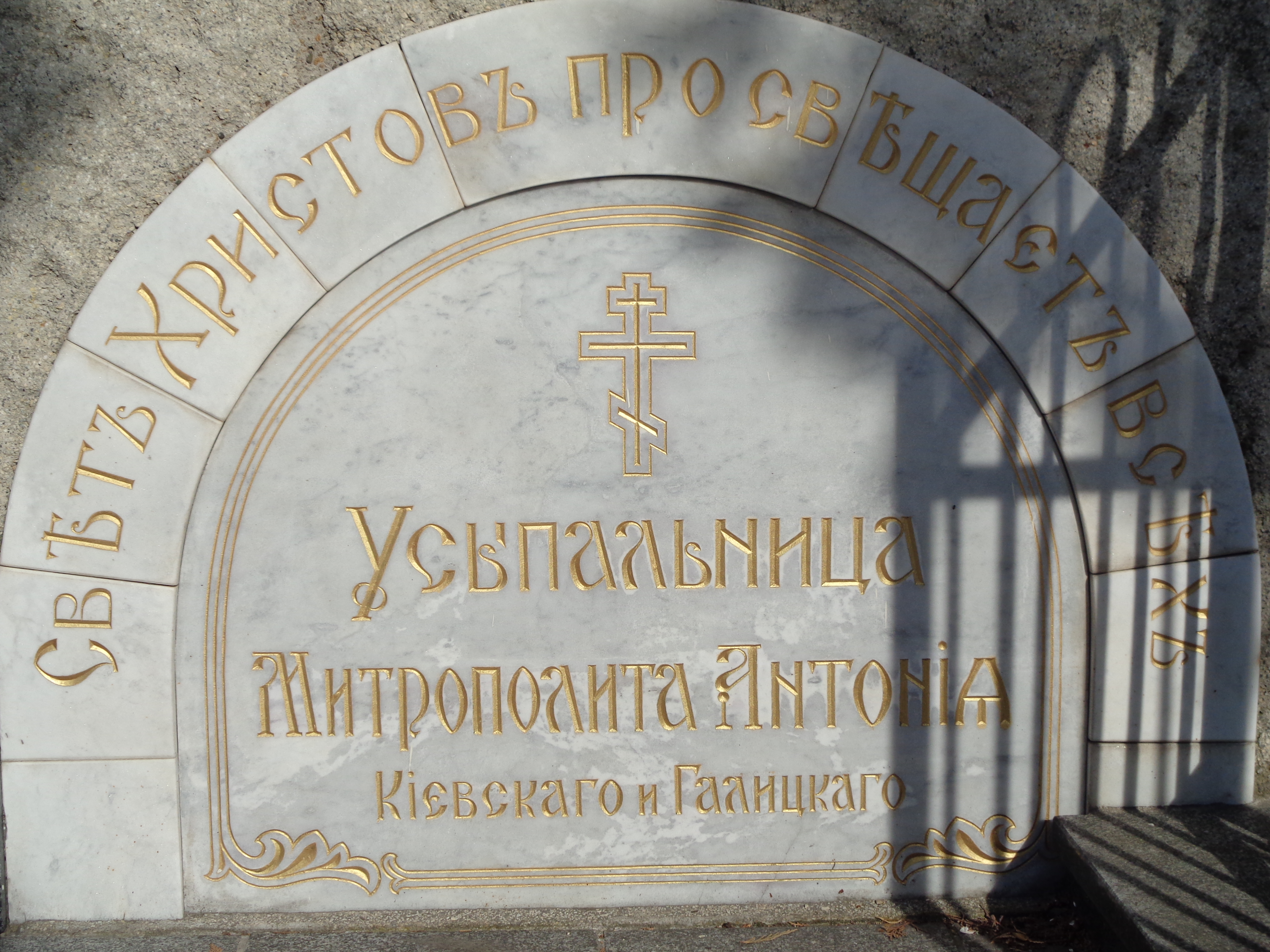

With the agreement of Patriarch Dimitrije of Serbia, the "General assembly of representatives of the Russian Church abroad" took place between 21 November and 2 December 1921, in Sremski Karlovci. It was later renamed the First All-Diaspora Council and was presided over by Metropolitan Anthony. The Council established the "Supreme Ecclesiastic Administration Abroad" (SEAA), composed of a patriarchal Locum Tenens, a Synod of Bishops, and a Church Council. The Council decided to appoint Metropolitan Anthony the Locum Tenens, but he declined to accept the position without permission from Moscow and instead called himself the President of the SEAA. However, a Decree of Patriarch St. Tikhon of Moscow of 5 May 1922, abolished the SEAA and declared the political decisions of the Karlovci Council as not reflecting the position of the Russian Church. Meeting in Sremski Karlovci on 2 September 1922, the Council of Bishops agreed to abolish the SEAA, in its place forming the Temporary Holy Synod of Bishops of the Russian Orthodox Church Outside Russia with Metropolitan Anthony as its head by virtue of seniority. The Synod exercised direct authority over Russian parishes in the Balkans, the Middle East, and the Far East. In North America, however, a conflict erupted with those who did not recognize the authority of the Synod, led by Metropolitan Platon (Rozhdestvensky); this group formed the American Metropolia, the predecessor to the OCA. Likewise, in Western Europe, Metropolitan Eulogius (Georgievsky) also did not recognize anything more than "a moral authority" of the Synod. Metropolitan Eulogius later broke off and in February 1931 joined the Ecumenical Patriarchate, forming the Patriarchal Exarchate for Orthodox Parishes of Russian Tradition in Western Europe.

On 9 September 1927, the Council of Bishops of the ROCOR, presided over by Metropolitan Anthony, decreed a formal break of communion with ecclesiastic authorities in Moscow after categorically rejecting a demand by Metropolitan Sergius (Stragorodsky) of Nizhny Novgorod, who was acting as Locum Tenens, to declare political loyalty to the Soviet authorities. Then, on 22 June 1934, Metropolitan Sergius and his Synod in Moscow passed judgment on Metropolitan Anthony and his Synod, declaring them to be under suspension. Metropolitan Anthony refused to recognize this decision, claiming that it was made under political pressure from Soviet authorities and that Metropolitan Sergius had illegally usurped the position of Locum Tenens. In this, he received the support of the Patriarch Varnava of Serbia, who continued to maintain communion with the ROCOR Synod.

During the course of his time outside Russia, Metropolitan Anthony continued to retain the title of Metropolitan of Kiev and Galicia, although his name stopped being mentioned in prayers in Kiev since June 1922. In March 1931, the Synod of Bishops awarded him the title of "Beatitude."

He became known as a polemicist who argued against papal supremacy. In the 1920s and 1930s he published in Russian many books on theology and literature. Some of his theological views, especially his soteriology, were severely criticised by a number of prominent Orthodox theologians.

In 1930, Antony issued a Message to all Orthodox Russian people calling for an armed struggle against the Bolsheviks.

Metropolitan Anthony died on 10 August 1936, in Sremski Karlovci, Serbia. Patriarch Varnava officiated at his funeral in St. Michael's Cathedral in Belgrade. He was buried at the Iveron Chapel in the New Cemetery in Belgrade.

A nine-volume Russian biography by bishop Nicon (Rklitsky) was published in New York, 1956-1962.

== Ideological views ==
As a leader of the nationalist Union of Russian People, Khrapovitsky saw religious agitation as the main direction of efforts for his organization. The metropolitan claimed that he felt "much closer" to a religious Jew or Mahommedan than to a non-religious Russian. He recognized the lack of perspectives for ethnic Russian nationalism in mostly ethnic Ukrainian lands of Volhynia and called for his subordinates to provide religious education to the local population instead. In his fight against the Catholic Church, he went as far as to ban priests of his eparchy from marrying Orthodox to Catholics, and introduced anathema for all Orthodox converts to Catholicism. According to Khrapovitsky, the main role of the Russian monarchy lay in protecting the Orthodox faith and subjecting itself to its religious commandments. He supported the reinstatement of Patriarchy in the Russian church.

A conservative monarchist, Khrapovitsky nevertheless shared some narodnik ideas and promoted some socially critical works of Nikolay Nekrasov. He also recognized ethnic and cultural differences between ethnic Russians ("Greater Russians") and Ukrainians ("Little Russians"), claiming that the latter better understood the ecumenical nature of the Christian Church.
