= Holy Orthodox Church in North America =

True Orthodox organisation

The Holy Orthodox Church in North America (HOCNA) is a True Orthodox denomination located primarily in the United States and Canada, with additional communities in Latin America, Europe, Africa, and Georgia. In 2010, the HOCNA had 2,212 congregants in 34 churches in the United States.

== History ==
1924 - Church of Greece adopts the New Calendar.
1935 - Three Metropolitans led by Chrysostom of Florina, renounce the calendar innovation and become the hierarchs of the Church of the True Orthodox Christians of Greece.
1955 - Metropolitan Chrysostom of Florina reposes, leaving no successor.
1960 - Archbishop Seraphim of Chicago and Bishop Theophilus of Detroit, both of the Russian Orthodox Church Abroad (ROCOR), secretly consecrate Archimandrite Akakios Pappas as Bishop of Talantion for the flock of the late Metropolitan Chrysostom.
1962 - Archbishop Leonty of Chile and Peru (ROCOR) and Bishop Akakios of Talantion consecrate three more bishops for the Church in Greece, including Bishop Auxentios of Gardikion.
1963 - Bishop Akakios of Talantion reposes. Bishop Auxentios of Gardikion becomes the Archbishop of Athens of the Church of the True Orthodox Christians of Greece.
1969 - Holy Synod of the Russian Orthodox Church Abroad under Saint Philaret Metropolitan of New York, recognizes the episcopal consecrations of the Synod of Archbishop Auxentios of Athens which had been enacted in 1960 without the knowledge of the Synod of ROCOR.
1979-1984 - Series of schisms occur in the True Orthodox Church of Greece with groups of bishops uncanonically separating from Archbishop Auxentios, as a result of which emerge the synods of Cyprian Koutsoumbas and of Chrysostomos Kiousis. In 2014, these two groups merge into a single synod under Kallinikos Sarantopoulos.
1985 - Repose of Saint Philaret, Metropolitan of New York, the First Hierarch of the Russian Orthodox Church Abroad.
1987 - Due to the change of ROCOR’s ecclesiastical course by Metropolitan Vitaly, the successor of Saint Philaret, monastic communities, parishes and clergy in the United States, Canada and France leave the Russian Orthodox Church Abroad and are accepted into the Synod of Archbishop Auxentios of Athens.
1988 - Holy Synod of Archbishop Auxentios of Athens consecrates Bishop Ephraim of Boston for the flock in North America. The Holy Orthodox Church in North America (HOCNA) is formally established.
1991 - Holy Synod of Archbishop Auxentios of Athens consecrates Bishop Makarios of Toronto, a second hierarch for the Holy Orthodox Church in North America.
1993 - Archbishop Auxentios of Athens elevates Bishop Ephraim and Bishop Makarios to the rank of Metropolitans and blesses them to organize the church ife in North America in full independence.
1994 - Repose of Archbishop Auxentios of Athens.
1997 - No acting bishops of the Synod of Archbishop Auxentios left in Greece. The succession of the Synod is continued by the bishops in North America and France. Metropolitan Makarios of Toronto is appointed the Locum Tenens of the See of Athens.
2001 - In view of the dissolution of the Synod of Archbishop Auxentios in Greece, the bishops in North America formally establish a local Synod of the Holy Orthodox Church in North America.
2016 - Holy Orthodox Church in North America reiterates its status as a self-administering, fully independent, locally-established Church by issuing a Synodal Affirmation of Autocephaly.

== Structure ==
- Holy Orthodox Metropolis of Boston (HOMB)
- Holy Orthodox Metropolis of Toronto
- Holy Orthodox Metropolis of Seattle
