= Philaret Voznesensky =

Russian Orthodox bishop venerated as a holy hierarch

Saint Philaret of New York
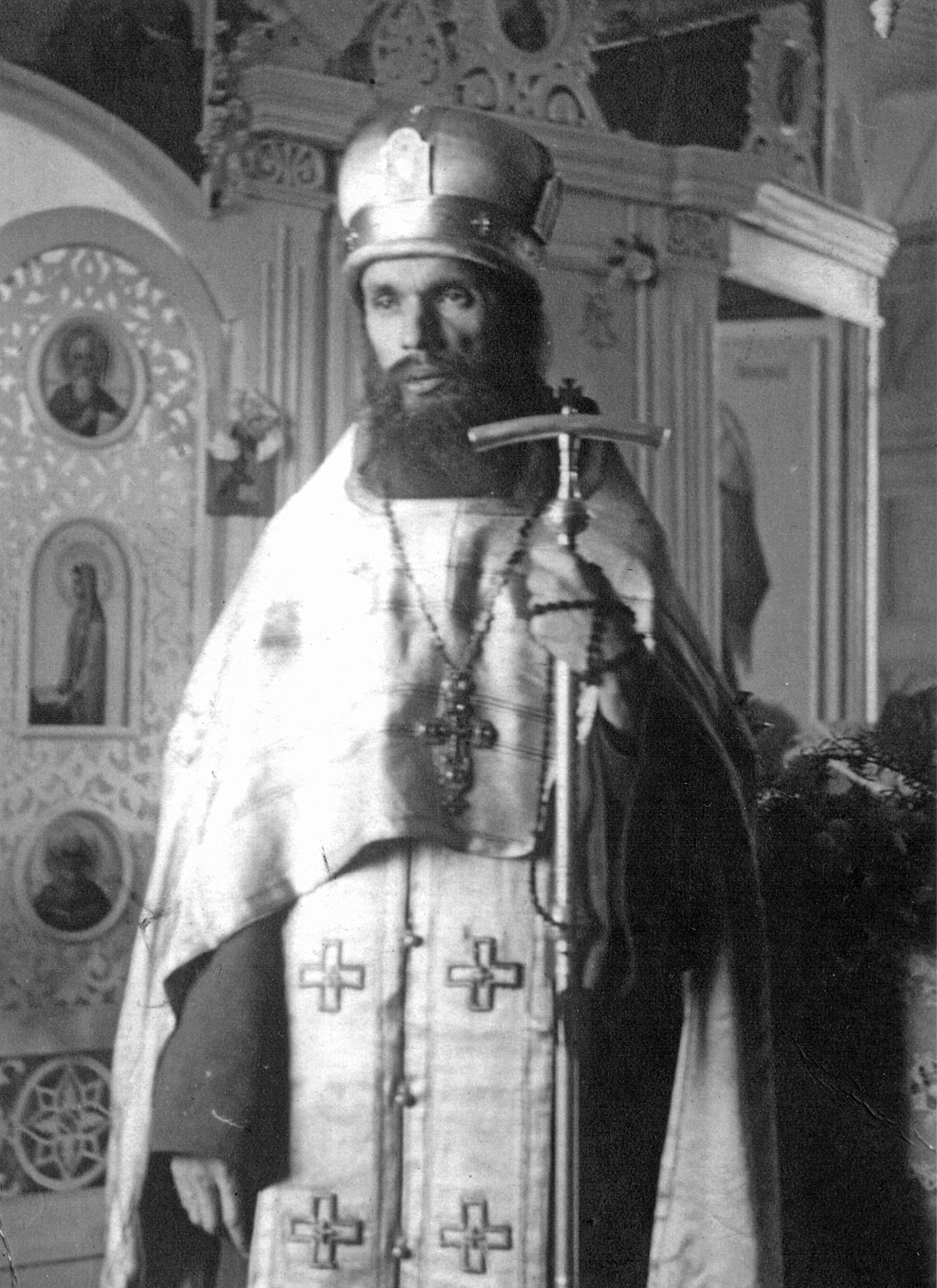
- Philaret serving in Harbin, China, 1953

First Hierarch of the Russian Orthodox Church Outside of Russia
- Born: March 22, 1903; Kursk, Russian Empire
- Died: November 21, 1985 (aged 82); Manhattan, New York, United States
- Venerated in: HOCNA, ROAC, RTOC, ROCOR-V-V, ROCOR-A
- Major shrine: Holy Trinity Monastery, Jordanville, New York

Metropolitan Philaret (Russian: Митрополит Филарет, secular name Georgy Nikolayevich Voznesensky, Russian: Георгий Николаевич Вознесенский; 22 March 1903 in Kursk, Russia – 21 November 1985 in New York City) was the First Hierarch of the Russian Orthodox Church Outside Russia from 1964 until his death on November 21, 1985.

He was ordained a deacon in 1930 and a priest in 1931. He served in Harbin (1930–1947), Three Rivers Region in Inner Mongolia (1947–1949), then again in Harbin (1949–1962). From 1945 to 1962, he was a cleric of the Moscow Patriarchate. In 1962, he left China for Australia, joining the ROCOR. On May 26, 1963, he was ordained bishop of Brisbane, vicar of the Diocese of Australia and New Zealand. On May 27, 1964, being a youngest bishop by ordination, he was elected the First Hierarch of the ROCOR. The years when Metropolitan Philaret headed the ROCOR became a period of making important decisions, including convergence to the Old Calendarists, anathematization of Lenin and the persecutors of the Orthodox Christianity (1970), the canonization of Nicholas II, his family and servants and the New Martyrs (1981), ordination of Lazarus Zhurbenko as a bishop for the "catacombs" (1982) and the condemnation of ecumenism (1983).

== Life ==
Georgy Voznesensky was born on March 22, 1903, in Kursk, Russia into a family of a priest, Father Nicholas Voznesensky and his wife Lydia. In 1909, his family moved to Blagoveschensk on the Amur River in Siberia.

In 1920, Georgy graduated from the local gymnasium. Later in 1920 in the midst of the Russian Civil War, his family moved to Harbin, Manchuria.

In 1921, his mother died, and his father accepted tonsure as a monk with the name Dimitri. Dimitri later became Archbishop of Hailar. He died in 1947 shortly after he repatriated to the Soviet Union.

Living in Harbin, Voznesensky entered the Russo-Chinese Polytechnic Institute from which he graduated in 1927 as an electromechanical engineer.

On 18 May 1930, he was ordained a deacon. On 4 January 1931, he was ordained a priest. On 12 December 1931 he was tonsured a monk with the name Philaret. In 1931, he graduated from St. Vladimir University. Soon afterwards, he entered the Pastoral and Theological courses at the Institute of St. Prince Vladimir. The courses was launch by his father, Nicholas Voznesensky.

In 1933, he was elevated to hegumen and 1937 to the rank of archimandrite. During this period he was also a professor of New Testament, Pastoral Theology, and Homiletics at St. Vladimir University.

In mid 1945, after the Communist Chinese and Soviet forces took over Manchuria at the end of World War II, archimandrite Philaret remained with the Orthodox believers in Manchuria, but he firmly rejected all attempts to get him to accept a Soviet passport. He held passport burning bonfires after church services in defiance of the communist authorities. Further, he fearlessly denounced the atheistic communists. His overt position against the Soviets placed him in great personal danger. Their hatred of him resulted in an attempt to burn him alive in his monastic cell. He escaped, but suffered severe burns.

== Departure from China and serving in Australia ==
By that time, the Russian population was leaving China en masse, settling mostly on the West Coast of the United States or Australia. The Synod of Bishops of the ROCOR, aware of his irreconcilable position towards communism and the Soviet government, has been trying to rescue Archimandrite Philaret from China since 1953. It was only by 1962 that the Archimandrite Philaret could come to Hong Kong. Despite his anti-communist views and reputation as a confessor, Archimandrite Philaret had to repent that he had been under the jurisdiction of the Moscow Patriarchate since 1945, and also sign a "penitential statement" in the form established by Bishops' Council of the ROCOR. This statement was approved on March 29, 1962, at a meeting of the ROCOR Synod. He arrived to Sydney on 3 April 1962. From there archimandrite Philaret quickly traveled to Brisbane, Australia where many of his former flock in Manchuria had settled.

On October 22 of the same year, at the Council of Bishops of the ROCOR, where Archbishop Sabbas arrived, Archimandrite Philaret was proposed to appoint to the Diocese of Brazil, but Archbishop Sabbas began to insist that Archimandrite Philaret be left in Australia and appointed vicar of the Australian diocese with the title of Bishop of Brisbane. Archbishop Sabbas reminded the bishops of his poor health and considered Archimandrite Philaret his possible successor, especially since many parishioners in Australia knew and respected Archimandrite Philaret, remembering his ministry in Harbin. The Council agreed to Sabbas' request and it was decided to ordain Archimandrite Philaret as vicar bishop for Australia.

On May 24, 1963, at the bishop's residence in Croydon, Archimandrite Philaret was nominated as a bishop. Nomination was performed by: Archbishop Sabbas (Rayevsky) of Sydney, his vicar Bishop Anthony (Medvedev) of Melbourne and hierarch of the Ecumenical Patriarchate of Constantinople bishop Dionysius (Psiahas) of Nazianzus. On May 26, 1963, Archimandrite Philaret was consecrated as Bishop of Brisbane, vicar of the Australian diocese by archbishop Sabbas and bishop Anthony of Melbourne. Bishop Dionysius attended, but did not concelebrate. As Archbishop Sabbas' health deteriorated more and more, Bishops Anthony and Philaret assumed part of his duties.

== First Hierarch ==
In the early 1960s, a confrontation broke out in the ROCOR between supporters of Archbishop John (Maximovich) and supporters of Archbishop Nikon (Rklitsky), who were considered as the most likely candidates for the First Hierarch position. The conflict was fueled by 2 different visions of the ROCOR mission: the supporters of St. John saw the ROCOR open to everyone and were ready in some cases to sacrifice the rite and calendar, while the representatives of the opposite party were inclined to see the ROCOR as a structure whose main task was to preserve Russian traditions. The views on church administration also differed: St. John and his supporters saw sobornost as a living, functioning basis of church existence, while the supporters of Archbishop Nikon actually acted as defenders of the pre-revolutionary Synodal system, which in the conditions of emigration meant the dictate of the office of the Holy Synod. On February 7, 1964, Metropolitan Anastasius announced his desire to retire due to his old age and state of health. The real purpose of such a departure was the desire to control the election of his successor, with the help of his authority to prevent shocks, conflicts and possible division within ROCOR.

On May 27, 1964, at the Bishops' Council, 90-year-old Metropolitan Anastasius (Gribanovsky) retires. The votes cast for Archbishop John and for Archbishop Nikon were divided almost equally. None of the parties wanted to concede. To get out of a difficult situation, the First Hierarch advised the bishops to elect a "neutral" bishop who does not belong to any of the church parties and preferably a young one. The most suitable candidate was the youngest bishop by ordination — Bishop Philaret of Brisbane, whose candidacy was proposed by Archbishop John. In order to avoid a split, he stated that he would withdraw his candidacy if the majority voted for Bishop Philaret. Archbishops Nikon (Rklitsky) and Averky (Taushev) did the same. At the end of the voting, Metropolitan Anastasius was asked either to approve the election of Bishop Philaret, or to remain in office. The Metropolitan rejected the second proposal and agreed with the Council's decision to elect a new First Hierarch.

On May 31, 1964, in the Synodal Cathedral Church the Sign, his introduction took place. After the Liturgy with the participation of all hierarchs, a white klobuk/cowl was placed on Metropolitan Philaret, and Archbishop John (Maximovich) of San Francisco, as the oldest hierarch, handed him an episcopal staff, and a second panagia was placed on Metropolitan Anastasius.

Metropolitan Philaret served as the first hierarch of the ROCOR for twenty one years. He reposed on November 21, 1985 at his home in Manhattan, and was buried in the cemetery of the Church of Dormition.

In November 1998, the Synod decided to transfer Metropolitan Philaret's relics to a new vault under the altar of Holy Trinity Cathedral at Jordanville, New York. When his tomb was opened, his relics were found to be incorrupt.

== Canonizations ==
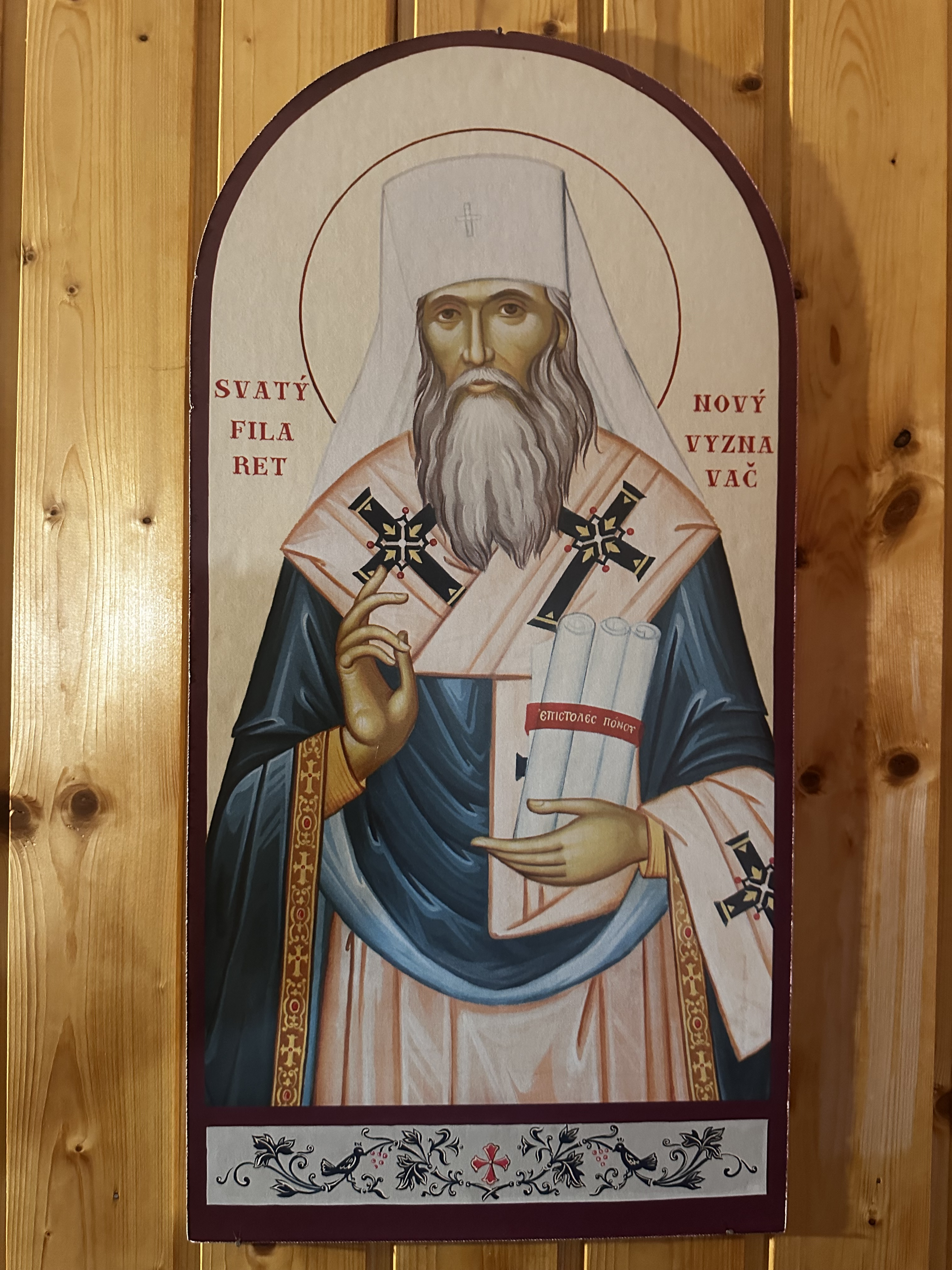
Icon of saint Philaret of New York, the new confessor (Prague, Czech Republic)

Metropolitan Philaret was canonized by the number of church groups which derive their succession from the ROCOR.

On April 30, 2001, Metropolitan Philaret was glorified by the Russian Orthodox Autonomous Church.

On May 19 – 20, 2001 Metropolitan Philaret was glorified by the Holy Orthodox Church in North America ("Boston Synod").

On November 20, 2008, Metropolitan Philaret was glorified by the (independent) Russian Orthodox Church Abroad headed by metropolitan Agathangel (Pashkovsky).

On October 23, 2009, Metropolitan Philaret was glorified at Holy Transfiguration Skete by the Russian Orthodox Church Abroad headed by archbishop Vladimir (Tselischev).

In 2012, the Eastern American Diocese of the Russian Orthodox Church Abroad headed by metropolitan Hilarion (Kapral) established a committee to explore the formal glorification of Metropolitan Philaret.

== Books ==
Available in English translation:

- Living According to God’s Will: Principles for the Christian Journey. Vosnesensky, P. Holy Trinity Publications, 2021. ISBN 9780884654438

== Sources ==
- Protopopov, Michael Alex (2005). A Russian Presence: A History of the Russian Church in Australia. Piscataway, NJ: Gorgias Press LLC.
- Кострюков, Андрей (2015). Русская Зарубежная Церковь в 1939—1964 гг.: Административное устройство и отношения с Церковью в Отечестве. Moscow: Издательство ПСТГУ. ISBN 978-5-7429-0931-6.
- Коростелёв, Валерий; Караулов, Александр (2019). Косик, Ольга (ed.). Православие в Маньчжурии. 1898—1956. Очерки истории (in Russian). Moscow: Издательство ПСТГУ. ISBN 978-5-7429-1307-8.
- Кострюков, Андрей (2021). Русская Зарубежная Церковь при митрополите Филарете (Вознесенском) (in Russian). Moscow: Издательство ПСТГУ. ISBN 978-5-7429-1388-7.
- Harrison, Nektarios, ed. (2022). Metropolitan Philaret of New York. Uncut Mountain Press. ISBN 978-1-63941-018-7.
