= Benjamin Fedchenkov =

Bishop of the Russian Orthodox Church

Metropolitan Benjamin
- Born: Ivan Afanasevich Fedchenkov; September 14, 1880; Tambov Governorate, Russian Empire
- Died: October 4, 1961 (aged 81); Pskovo-Pechorsky Monastery, USSR
- Occupation: Bishop of Russian Orthodox Church

Metropolitan Benjamin or Veniamin (Russian: Митрополи́т Вениами́н, born Iván Afanásevich Fédchenkov, Ива́н Афана́сьевич Фе́дченков; 14 September 1880 – 4 October 1961) was a bishop of the Russian Church, Orthodox missionary and writer.

== Family ==
His family consisted of two children and a wife.

== Education ==
Benjamin Fedchenkov was born in the village of selo Vazhki (Ilyinka), Tambov Governorate.

== 1917–1920. White movement ==
Benjamin supported the White movement and closely cooperated with Wrangel's army of the Crimean peninsula. Benjamin emigrated in November 1920 together with the defeated soldiers of the Wrangel army and other fugitives.

== Loyalty to Moscow Patriarchate ==
1933–1947 was Exarch of Moscow Patriarchate in North America.

From April 19, 1932, was Archbishop.

From July 14, 1938, was Metropolitan of the Aleutians and North America.

== Return ==
1947–1951 was Metropolitan of Riga and Latvia.

1951–1955 was Metropolitan of Rostov and Novocherkassk (from February 8, 1954, Metropolitan of Rostov and Kamensk).

November 28, 1955 – February 20, 1958 was Metropolitan of Saratov and Balashov (from December 26, 1957, Metropolitan of Saratov and Volsk).

== Late life ==
He died in Pskovo-Pechorsky Monastery, and is buried in the caves of the monastery.
