= Vitaly Ustinov =

4th First Hierarch of the Russian Orthodox Church Outside Russia

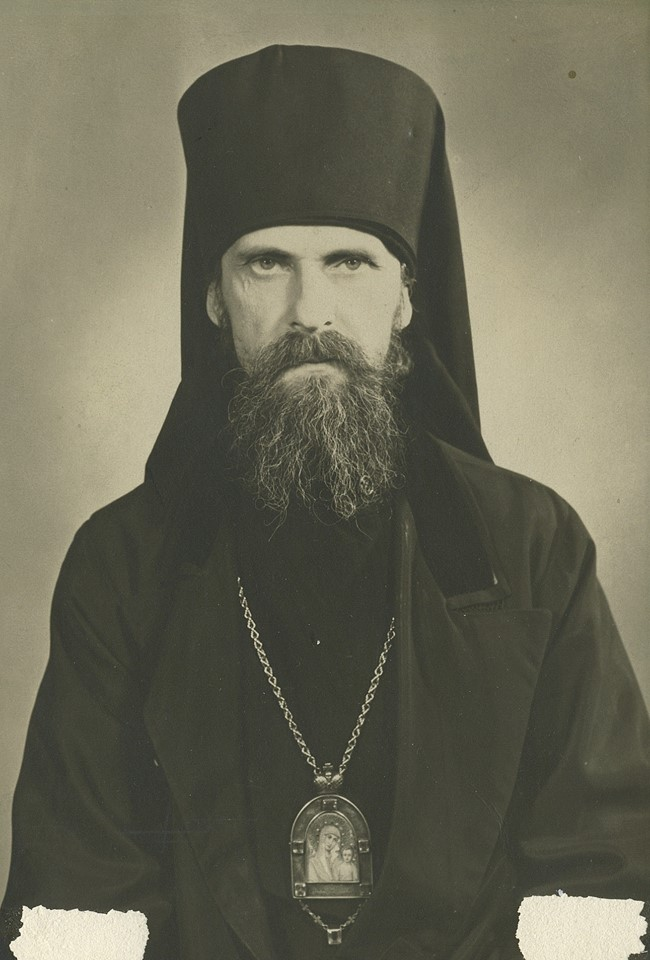
Bishop Vitaly in 1959

Metropolitan Vitaly (Russian: Митрополит Виталий, secular name Rostislav Petrovich Ustinov, Russian: Ростислав Петрович Устинов; 18 March 1910, St Petersburg – 25 September 2006, Magog, Quebec, Canada) was the fourth First Hierarch of the Russian Orthodox Church Outside Russia, from 1985 until his retirement in 2001; he was also the First Hierarch of the ROCOR(V) from 2001 until his death.

== Biography ==
=== Early life ===
Rostislav Petrovich Ustinov was born to naval officer Peter Ustinov and Lydia Andreevna (née Stopchanskaya), daughter of the General of Police in the Caucasus. In 1920, during the Civil War in Russia, Rostislav Ustinov moved with his family to Crimea. There he enlisted into a cadet corps military school established by General Pyotr Wrangel. At the end of the year the corps, numbering 650 cadets, moved to Istanbul, and thence to Yugoslavia. In 1923, his mother recalled him to Istanbul, after which she moved to Paris and placed him in the French college of Saint Louis in the city of Le Mans. After completing his studies, Rostislav lived with mother in Cannes. In 1934, he was called to serve in the army and was enlisted in the Ninth Cuirassier (cavalry) Regiment. Having served up to the grade of foreman, he refused to continue military career as an officer, deciding to leave the world and to enter a monastery. Four years later, he arrived in the Monastery of Saint Job of Pochayev in Ladomirová in the Carpathian Mountains (at the time, the territory of Czechoslovakia). In 1939, Rostislav Ustinov was professed a monk with the name of Vitaly, and received the Little Schema a year later.

The Second World War forced the monastic brotherhood to leave Ladomirova and to evacuate to Germany. Vitaly came to Berlin where, together with archimandrite Nathaniel (Lvov), he engaged in wide missionary activity amongst the Russian refugees and prisoners of war. Nafanail and Vitaly then relocated to Hamburg where they concentrated on the work of preventing thousands of refugees from being compulsorily repatriated to the USSR. In Hamburg, hegumen Vitaly began active church life at Camp Fischbeck. In the barrack-type church, the daily circle of divine services were conducted. Simultaneously, Vitaly began a small monastic brotherhood, and established a printing house which began to print much needed anthologies from the church service-books for all the camp churches of Germany. From 1947 to 1951, Vitaly was Prior of the ROCOR parish in London. Archimandrite Anthony (Bloom) had arrived in London in 1948 to serve the parish which belonged to the Moscow Patriarchate: they used the same church and served on alternate Sundays.

=== Bishop and First-Hierarch ===
On 12 July 1951, on the feast of Saints Peter and Paul, Vitaly was consecrated Bishop of São Paulo, vicar of the Brazilian diocese. There the young bishop opened a printing house and arranged a small shelter for boys who were trained as acolytes for the cycle of divine services. In 1955, Bishop Vitaly with his brotherhood was transferred to Edmonton, Alberta, Canada. 75 miles from the city, he erected the Dormition monastery.

He was appointed ruling bishop of Montreal and Canada, and he founded a skete in Mansonville, Quebec. In Montreal, Bishop Vitaly built and magnificently equipped a large cathedral. The fine house of his(its) monastic farmstead and a residence is near to a cathedral. In this farmstead, a printing house operated, publishing service-books and the periodical "The Orthodox Bulletin".

The death of Metropolitan Philaret in 1985 necessitated the election of a new Metropolitan. On 22 January 1986, Vitaly was elected Metropolitan of Eastern America and New York, also retaining management of the Canadian diocese.

== Retirement and schism ==
Citing his declining health in 2001 Metropolitan Vitaly announced that he was going to retire the same year. During the council of Bishops of 2001, Metropolitan Vitaly announced his resignation. Immediately afterwards, he left to his residence at the Holy Transfiguration monastery in Mansonville, accompanied by his supporters.

After the election of the new First-Hierarch of ROCOR, Metropolitan Laurus, Metropolitan Vitaly released an epistle denouncing the latest ROCOR Synod, asserting that he continued to be ROCOR's primate. A number of ROCOR clergy and parishioners who were against ROCOR's union with the Moscow Patriarchate formed a new church administration around Metropolitan Vitaly, renaming themselves as the Russian Orthodox Church in Exile (referred to as ROCOR-Vitaly in common parlance).

The episcopate of ROCOR asserted that Metropolitan Vitaly was being held hostage by schismatics who took advantage of his failing health and used his name to produce a schism. The episcopate made numerous attempts at contacting Metropolitan Vitaly and his personal assistant Lyudmila Rosniansky, but were unable to get through to him personally nor to his assistant, so that his own position regarding the schism remains unknown. The NY Post reported that Archbishop Gabriel Chemodakov of the Synod then filed a court case concerning the health issues of Metropolitan Vitaly which were reported by the NY Daily News in 2002 as to the Court finding no unusual health issues with the Metropolitan upon interviewing him for purposes of dismissing the court case against him.

Metropolitan Vitaly died on 25 September 2006. He was buried in his Mansonville skete by the clergy of the Russian Orthodox Church in Exile. ROCOR bishops were not permitted to be present, consequently they celebrated his funeral separately.

== See also ==
- Russian Orthodox Church Outside Russia
- White Emigre
