= James Scott =

James Scott may refer to:

== Entertainment ==
- James Scott (composer) (1885–1938), African-American ragtime composer
- James Scott (director) (born 1941), British filmmaker
- James Scott (actor) (born 1979), British television actor
- James Scott (Shortland Street), character on the TV soap opera Shortland Street
- James Honeyman-Scott (1956–1982), British guitarist and member of The Pretenders

== Military ==
- James Scott (marine) (died 1796), Sergeant of Marines in the New South Wales Marine Corps
- James Scott (Royal Navy officer) (1790–1872), British naval officer
- James Bruce Scott (1892–1974), officer in the British Indian Army
- James Robinson Scott (died 1821), Scottish naval surgeon and noted amateur botanist
- James Stanley Scott (1889–1975), Royal Canadian Air Force officer

== Politics ==
=== United Kingdom ===
- James Scott of Balwearie (died 1606), Scottish landowner and supporter of the rebel earls
- James Scott, 1st Duke of Monmouth (1649–1685), noble recognized by some as James II of England
- James Scott, Earl of Dalkeith (1674–1705), English nobleman and politician
- James Scott (1671–1732), British MP, 1710–1711
- James Scott (British Army officer, died 1747) (c. 1672–1747), MP for Kincardineshire 1713–1734
- James Scott (Bridport MP) (1776–1855), British MP, 1820–1826
- James Winter Scott (1799–1873), MP for North Hampshire, 1832–1837
- James Scott (Liberal politician) (1876–1939), British MP, 1929–1931
- Sir James Sibbald David Scott, 3rd Baronet (1814–1885), 3rd Scott baronets, of Dunninald
- Sir James Sibbald Scott, 1st Baronet (died 1819), 1st Scott baronets, of Dunninald

=== Elsewhere ===
- James Scott (Australian politician) (1810–1884), member of the Tasmanian House of Assembly
- Jim Scott (Australian politician) (born 1946, James Alan Scott), Australian politician
- James Scott (American politician), Arizona state senator
- James A. Scott (born 1942), member of the Florida Senate
- James F. Scott (West Virginia), delegate to the Second Wheeling Convention of 1861
- James George Scott (1851–1935), Scottish journalist and colonial administrator who introduced football to Burma
- James Reid Scott (1839–1877), explorer and colonial administrator in the Australian colony of Tasmania
- James George Scott (1851–1935), colonial administrator in Burma
- James M. Scott (Canadian politician) (1860–1943), Canadian politician
- Jim Scott (Virginia politician) (James Martin Scott, 1938–2017), member of the Virginia House of Delegates

== Sports ==
- James Scott (basketball) (born 1972), American professional basketball player
- James Scott (cricketer) (born 1978), English cricketer
- James Scott (footballer, born 1881) (1881–?), Scottish footballer
- James Scott (footballer, born 1882) (1882–?), Scottish footballer
- James Scott (footballer, born 1895) (1895–1916), Scottish footballer
- James Scott (footballer, born 1905) (1905–?), Scottish footballer
- James Scott (footballer, born 2000), Scottish footballer
- James Melvin Scott (1911–2001), American Senior Olympian, author, inventor
- James Scott (boxer) (1947–2018), American light heavyweight fighter
- James Scott (gridiron football) (born 1952), NFL wide receiver
- James Scott (rugby union) (born 1999), English rugby union player
- Jumbo Scott (James William Scott, 1903—1949), Scottish international rugby union player

== Other ==
- James Scott (antiquarian) (1733–1818), minister in Perth and antiquarian
- James Brown Scott (1866–1943), American authority on international law
- James C. Scott (1936–2024), American political scientist and agrarian studies scholar
- James F. Scott (1942–2020), American physicist and FRAM pioneer
- James Hope-Scott (1812–1873), English barrister and Tractarian
- James M. Scott, American military historian
- James Maurice Scott (1906–1986), British explorer and writer
- James Robb Scott (1882–1965), Scottish architect
- James Scott (cardiologist) (born 1946), British cardiologist
- James Scott (criminal) (born 1969), American, convicted of contributing to the Great Flood of 1993
- James Scott (obstetrician) (1924–2006), Scottish obstetrician and gynaecologist
- James Scott (police officer) (1899–1966), Irish police officer
- James Scott (political writer) (1733–1814), English cleric and academic, known for his "Anti-Sejanus" letters
- James Scott (priest) (died 1912), Irish Anglican priest
- James A. Scott (1895–1983), Superintendent Indian Police
- James V. Scott, minister in the United Church of Canada
- James Scott (judge) (1767–1855), American lawyer, judge, and politician from Indiana

== See also ==
- Jim Scott (disambiguation)
- Jamie Scott (disambiguation)
- Jamie Scott (born 1984), British singer
