= Gap analysis (conservation) =

Gap analysis is a tool used in wildlife conservation to identify gaps in conservation lands (e.g., protected areas and nature reserves) or other wildlands where significant plant and animal species and their habitat or important ecological features occur.

Gap analysis rests on the principle that having protected areas on a map does not guarantee that the right places are protected. Researchers distinguish between three different types of gaps: representation gaps, ecological gaps, and management gaps. These three types of gaps often coexist within the same landscape; a species may technically fall within the boundaries of a nature reserve, yet still face threats from logging, human settlement, or insufficient management.

Conservation managers or scientists can use it as a basis for providing recommendations to improve the representativeness of nature reserves or the effectiveness of protected areas so that these areas provide the best value for conserving biological diversity. With the information that a gap analysis yields, the boundaries of protected areas may be designed to subsume 'gaps' containing significant populations of wildlife species that can enhance the long-term survival of a larger metapopulation of the species already within the managed or protected area, or to include a diversity of wildlife species or ecosystems that merit protection but are inadequately represented in an existing protected area network. Gap assessments can be done using the geographic information system: land maps that delineate topography, biological and geological features (forest cover, plains, rivers, etc.), boundaries, land ownership and use are overlaid with the distribution of wildlife species. How much of the species' distribution fall within or without the conservation lands, or within a highly exploited area etc. can be identified.

At its simplest, a gap analysis is an assessment of the extent to which a protected area system meets protection goals set by a nation or region to represent its biological diversity. Gap analyses can vary from simple exercises based on a spatial comparison of biodiversity with existing protected areas to complex studies that need detailed data gathering and analysis, mapping and use of software decision packages.

== Gap types ==
Gap analyses generally consider a range of different "gaps" in a protected area network:

- Representation gaps: either no representations of a particular species or ecosystem in any protected area, or not enough examples of the species or ecosystem represented to ensure long-term protection.
- Ecological gaps: while the species or ecosystem occurs in the protected area system, occurrence is either of inadequate ecological condition, or the protected area(s) fail to address species' movements or specific ecological conditions needed for long-term survival or ecosystem functioning.
- Management gaps: protected areas exist but management regimes (management objectives, governance types, or management effectiveness) do not provide full security for particular species or ecosystems given local conditions.

== Citizen Science in Gap Analysis ==
Citizen science efforts can contribute valuable data toward the recognition of representation, ecological, and management gaps in conservation and restoration efforts that may have otherwise been costly or labor-intensive for researchers or institutions to undertake.

In a gap analysis evaluating the effectiveness of protected areas for the preservation of the short-snouted seahorse (Hippocampus hippocampus) and long-snouted seahorse (H. guttalatus) along the Italian coast, researchers used data collected through iSeahorse, a part of Project Seahorse. This tool enables divers from around the world, including ecotourists, to contribute photographs and observations of seahorse species. By combining this citizen-sourced data with geographic information systems (GIS) and species distribution models, researchers were able to identify a representation gap, estimating that only 25-30% of the habitat where these species were spotted was currently under protection by existing conservation areas.

In another study, researchers completed a gap analysis for the preservation of the critically endangered Harpy Eagle (Harpia harpyja). The researchers used data sourced from eBird, an application that allows citizens to contribute photographs and observations of avian sightings. Incorporating information gathered from eBird, the species' predicted habitat, and a species distribution model, the researchers concluded that the Harpy Eagle's current designated conservation areas covered approximately 18% of its potential range.

In Argentina, the non-governmental organization Aves Argentinas assembled volunteers to conduct annual bird surveys of the threatened Yellow Cardinal (Gubernatrix cristata) from September to October each year from 2015 to 2017. These volunteers recorded observations of the Yellow Cardinal and its nesting sites, providing valuable data to researchers completing a gap analysis aimed at understanding changes in the species' habitat selection over time to assess the adequacy of existing protected areas. This analysis supported researchers in identifying the variations between the current habitats and protected zones.

== Applications ==
A 2020 study published in Current Biology found that within the proposed boundaries of Giant Panda National Park (GPNP), 38.9% of suitable giant panda (Ailuropoda melanoleuca) habitat was not covered by any existing protected area, with coverage gaps varying considerably by mountain range, exceeding half of available habitat in the Qionglai Mountains. The study also found that within formally protected areas, 23.2% of panda habitat had overlapping designations from multiple management authorities – nature reserves, forest parks, scenic areas, and geological parks – with different, sometimes conflicting rules about permitted human activities. Critically, the study went beyond identifying the protection status of an area, also examining whether timber extraction and human disturbance were actually being restricted within existing protected areas. In Sichuan Province alone, 11.7% of panda habitat inside protected areas had no practical restriction on either activity. The authors argued that gap analysis must account for both legal designation on paper and actual on-the-ground management effectiveness in order to be a meaningful planning tool.

A separate 2020 study published in Landscape Ecology examined the spatial connectivity of protected areas using two large carnivores, the Persian leopard (Panthera pardus saxicolor) and the Asiatic cheetah (Acinonyx jubatus venaticus), in Iran’s network of conservation areas. The authors used species distribution models to map suitable habitat across the region, then applied graph theory to assess how much suitable habitat fell within the protected areas and how well those areas were connected across the landscape. Their analysis found that even when a species appeared adequately represented in terms of total area coverage, isolated protected areas with poor connectivity could still leave populations at risk of local extinction. This finding has significant implications for reserve design. Although a protected area system composed of large, isolated fragments may score reasonably well on a traditional representation-based gap analysis, it will fail to support viable populations in the long term if wildlife cannot move between fragments, making it critical to incorporate connectivity metrics into gap analysis.

A 2019 study published in Science of the Total Environment conducted a comprehensive gap analysis of the two major international reference databases – the Barcode of Life Data Systems (BOLD) and NCBI GenBank – for roughly 28,000 aquatic species subject to monitoring requirements under the European Union’s Water Framework Directive (WFD) and Marine Strategy Framework Directive (MSFD). The study found that reference library coverage varied widely across taxonomic groups and regions. Well-studied groups targeted by dedicated barcoding programs, including fish, caddisflies, and vascular plants, were generally well represented. Groups such as diatoms, molluscs, and sea squirts (ascidians) had significantly fewer records. The authors also found that species monitored by multiple countries were more likely to have reference barcodes available, while those monitored in only one or two countries were frequently missing from the databases. Another issue was that up to 50% of sequences in some taxonomic groups existed only as private data within BOLD, unavailable to researchers and monitoring agencies without access. The authors concluded that future monitoring efforts should prioritize filling gaps for species with regulatory monitoring requirements across multiple countries, and emphasized the need for stronger data-sharing standards to ensure that publicly funded monitoring data is publicly accessible.

== U.S. Gap Analysis Project ==
The gap analysis process itself was conceived in the 1980s, by J. Michael Scott, at the University of Idaho. He developed methods to assess endangered birds in Hawaii and began by mapping the distribution of each species individually. Then he combined data on individual species to create a map of species richness throughout the island. Until this approach was developed there was no broad scale way to assess the level of protection given to areas rich in biodiversity. The results of this analysis led to creation of the Hakaiau Forest National Wildlife Refuge, in one of the areas of highest species richness. In the late 1980s, Scott and other researchers at the University of Idaho Cooperative Fish and Wildlife Research Unit initiated an Idaho Gap Analysis Project as a first pilot project under the auspices of the U.S. Fish and Wildlife Service. Following two years of methods development, the program was launched in 1989 as part of the U.S. Geological Survey under the title Gap Analysis Program (GAP). GAP is now known as the Gap Analysis Project.

The Gap Analysis Project mission is to provide state, regional, and national biodiversity assessments of the conservation status of native vertebrate species, aquatic species, and natural land cover types and to facilitate the application of this information to land management activities. The stated goal of GAP is "keeping common species common". GAP partners in the development of four core datasets: a detailed map of the terrestrial ecosystems of the United States; maps of predicted habitat distributions for the terrestrial vertebrate species for the U.S.; distribution models for aquatic species; and the Protected Areas Database of the U.S.

== Global Projects ==
The Kunming-Montreal Global Biodiversity Framework, adopted by 196 countries at COP15 in December 2022, includes Target 3, commonly referred to as “30x30,” which calls for protecting 30% of the world’s land, freshwater, and ocean areas by 2030. As of 2022, approximately 17% of land and 8% of marine areas were under some form of formal protection. Gap analysis is central to evaluating whether progress toward such targets is meaningful. Simply adding land area to a protected area network does not guarantee that the most ecologically important or biodiverse areas are being protected. Protected areas have historically tended to be established in convenient locations, often with little human activity already, not necessarily where biodiversity is at greatest risk. This concern points to what might be called a “quality gap”, which is the possibility that a country could reach the 30% threshold while still leaving the most critical habitats for biodiversity unprotected. Gap analysis tools, including the Protected Areas Database of the United States (PAD-US) and its GAP status coding system (which rates land 1-4 from fully protected to unprotected), have been developed specifically to help distinguish between areas protected areas where restrictions are actually enforced and areas where they are not.

== Critiques and limitations ==
=== Threat indicators, scale dependence & the 'modifiable areal unit problem' ===
Indicators of human threats, such as population growth, land use, and road density have been proposed to enhance gap analysis and further prioritize which 'gaps' are most immediately threatened. However, because species responses to threats vary, gap analysis can only portray potential threats. Indicators of conservation value, such as species richness, have no inherent spatial scale. Thus, the optimal scale range for the minimum mapping unit (MMU) is determined on a case-by-case basis, compromising scientific credibility with data availability and cost effectiveness. Scale dependence of the MMU as a variant of the 'modifiable areal unit problem', or MAUP. The larger the MMU, the more species it will contain, either over-generalizing species richness by using large units or increasing statistical uncertainty for habitat distributions by using small units. Scale dependence introduces statistical error in spatial analysis.

=== Mapping uncertainty ===
Predicted species habitat distributions in GAP data contain numerous errors of commission (attributing presence where a species is absent) and errors of omission (attributing absence where a species is present) resulting in large composite error when map layers are combined. Despite this fact, species distribution maps produced by gap analysis rarely incorporate error into the visual representation. In gap analysis applications, it can result in dramatically different conservation recommendations. In addition, residual multiscale sampling effects can be identified using a statistical covariation measure, such as sensitivity analysis.

=== The 'shifting baseline syndrome' ===
The baseline for all National GAP projects is determined by the satellite data used to determine the vegetation cover that predicts species habitat distribution, which already includes a large percentage of anthropogenic land uses. First, because historic species distribution is not known, gap analysis results are a mere fraction of any species original habitat. Also, the static nature of gap analysis currently is not able to show the dynamic response capacity of species to change or species viability over time. Shifting baselines require that gap analysis incorporates a case-by-case consideration of management goals and definitions of conservation success.

=== Socio-Ecological Gap Analysis ===
A study published in Proceedings of the National Academy of Sciences examined 91 African carnivore species using a framework that integrates threat layers, including drought patterns and measures of human pressure, and resource layers, including the extent of protected areas, cultural diversity, and governance. The study built an index of "available conservation capacity" (ACC) for each location within each species’ range, identifying places where there are significant threats to a species. The results found that smaller-bodied carnivore species, typically considered lower-risk than large megafauna, were found to have less available conservation capacity across their species ranges than larger species, suggesting that standard gap analyses may significantly underestimate extinction risk for less prominent species. The study also found that areas with larger cultural diversity sometimes correlated with higher conservation capacity, highlighting the value of local and indigenous people filling in the gaps that formal protected areas may leave.
