= James Corazza =

American bishop (born 1958)

James Neil Corazza (born December 13, 1958) is an American bishop, who has served as a bishop of the Russian Orthodox Church Outside Russia, auxiliary bishop of Sonora, vicar of the Western American Diocese since November 6, 2019.

== Biography ==
Corazza was born on December 13, 1958, in Berkeley, California. In 1970, the family moved to Oregon. He studied at the University of California, Santa Cruz.

In 1979, he converted to Eastern Orthodoxy from Lutheranism with the influence of Seraphim (Rose). According to his own memoirs: "I shall never forget the evening – after a year and a half of difficult searching — when I finished Orthodoxy and the Religion of the Future and everything fell joyously into place, and I knew beyond all doubt and vacillation that my future was to be in Christ's Church"

After graduating from the university in 1982, he received the blessing of Bishop Basil (Rodzianko) to enter a monastery of the Western American Diocese of the Orthodox Church in America. In 1983, he and the brotherhood to which he belonged, was received into the Russian Orthodox Church Outside Russia by Archbishop Anthony (Medvedev) of Western America and San Francisco.

In 1984, he was sent to the Old Sorrowful Cathedral in San Francisco, where he served as a subdeacon. In September 1986, he was tonsured a monk. In 1994, he was ordained a hierodeacon by Metropolitan Vitaly (Ustinov) to the same church, and in 2004 he was ordained a presbyter by Archbishop Kyrill (Dmitrieff) of San Francisco. In 2006, he was tonsured a monk.

He organizes tours for Orthodox pilgrims coming to San Francisco to venerate St. John of Shanghai and San Francisco. He organized and conducted various presentations for parishioners and youth conferences on various spiritual and church topics in the United States and abroad.

In February 2013, he was included in the editorial board of the journal of the Western American Diocese "Spiritual Spring", which began publication in the same year.

On August 5, 2015, Archbishop Kyrill (Dmitrieff) of San Francisco and Western America was elevated to the rank of hegumen in the Old Cathedral in honor of the Icon of the Mother of God "Joy of All the Sorrowing" for the patronal feast.

On June 27, 2019, the Synod of Bishops of the ROCOR, after reviewing the results of a survey of the members of the Bishops' Council, elected Hegumen James as Bishop of Sonora, vicar of the Western American Diocese. In addition, he was confirmed as the abbot of the Monastery of St. Silouan of Athos in Sonora, California.

On June 29, 2019, Metropolitan Hilarion (Kapral), the First Hierarch of the ROCOR, was elevated to the dignity of Archimandrite during the celebrations dedicated to the 25th anniversary of the glorification of John of Shanghai and San Francisco by the ROCOR.

On August 30, 2019, the Holy Synod of the Russian Orthodox Church approved the decision of the Synod of Bishops of the ROCOR to elect Archimandrite James as Bishop of Sonora, the second vicar of the Western American Diocese.

On November 5, 2019, at the Cathedral of the Icon of the Mother of God "Joy of All Who Sorrow" in San Francisco, he was named, and on November 6 he was consecrated Bishop of Sonora, vicar of the Western American Diocese. The consecration was performed by: Archbishop Kyrill (Dmitrieff) of San Francisco and Western America, Archbishop Benjamin (Peterson) of San Francisco and the West (Orthodox Church in America), Bishop Theodosius (Ivashchenko) of Seattle, Bishop Nicholas (Olhovsky) of Manhattan.
