= Jim Scott =

Jim or Jimmy Scott may refer to:

== Music ==
- Jimmy Scott (1925–2014), American jazz vocalist
- Jim Scott (producer), music engineer and producer
- Jim Scott (musician), acoustic guitar player and songwriter
- Jimmy Scott (songwriter), British-born musician and songwriter, known for his work on Roger Daltrey's Can't Wait to See the Movie

== Politics ==
- Jim Scott (trade unionist) (1900–1962), Scottish trade union leader
- Jim Scott (Virginia politician) (1938–2017), American politician and community affairs consultant
- Jim Scott (Australian politician) (born 1946), politician from Western Australia

== Sports ==
- James Melvin Scott (1911–2001), American author, inventor, and Senior Olympian
- Jim Scott (American football) (fl. 1986–2004), American college football coach
- Jim Scott (bowls) (born 1950), New Zealand lawn and indoor bowls player
- Jim Scott (footballer) (born 1940), Scottish international association football player
- Jim Scott (pitcher) (1888–1957), American professional baseball pitcher
- Jim Scott (shortstop) (born John William Scott; 1887–1962), American professional baseball shortstop
- Jimmy Scott (born Martin Scott in 1986), Scottish association football player
- Jimmy Scott (footballer, born 1927), Scottish footballer
- Jimmy Scott (footballer, born 1934), English association football player
- Jimmy Scott (curler) (fl. 1959), Scottish curler

== See also ==
- James Scott (disambiguation)
- Jamie Scott (disambiguation)
