= Gap analysis (disambiguation) =

Gap analysis is a business assessment tool.

Gap analysis may also refer to:

- Gap analysis (conservation), a tool used in wildlife conservation to identify gaps in conservation lands
  - Gap Analysis Program in the U.S.
- Capability gap analysis in systems engineering
