= Eileen Rose Busby =

American historian

- Born: Eileen May Rose; August 15, 1922; Two Harbors, Minnesota, U.S.
- Died: April 6, 2005 (aged 82); San Diego, California, U.S.
- Occupations: Antiques expert, author, writer
- Spouses: Richard Busby; James M. Scott
- Children: 5, including Cathy and J. Michael
- Parent(s): Esther Rose; Frank Rose
- Relatives: Seraphim Rose (brother)

Eileen Rose Busby (August 15, 1922 – April 6, 2005) was an American author and antiques expert who was featured on HGTV's Appraise It! show.

== Early life ==
Busby was born Eileen May Rose in Two Harbors, Minnesota. Her parents, Frank and Esther Rose, relocated to San Diego while she was still a baby. Busby taught herself to read when she was 3 years old, skipped a grade in school, and graduated from San Diego High School at age 16.

== Biography ==
Busby, who first married James (Jim) Scott and then Richard Busby, often spoke before groups about antiques collecting. She also taught a how-to course for many years at Cuyamaca College and Grossmont College, community colleges in El Cajon, California. She wrote two books about the history and collecting of Royal Winton Porcelain and Cottage Ware. Her third book, Chintz and Pastel Ware, co-authored with daughter Cordelia Mendoza, also an antiques expert and an appraiser, is scheduled for posthumous publication by Schiffer Publishing in 2011. She was scheduled to lecture at the annual Chintz Convention, held in Northern California in April 2005, a month after her death.

Busby's book Cottage Ware is referenced in collector Judith Miller's book Buy, Sell, or Keep, and she is listed in Kovels' Yellow Pages.

Busby and her husband, Richard, lived Bury St. Edmunds, England, for 10 years, some of it spent in a thatched roof cottage, from where they traveled the countryside researching Royal Winton and chintz. Busby wrote articles about their travels while Richard took photos, which were published in Sea magazine and International Yachtsman. While living in England, Busby passed the UK's Mensa exam and became a member. She also taught word processing at a U.S. military base.

Busby was a member of the San Diego chapter of Mensa and the San Diego Press Club, and was featured in 2004 in the Antiques Road Show's newsletter. In 1999, Busby was featured as a collector on HGTV's Appraise It! show, taped at Butterfield & Butterfield's auction house in Los Angeles. She earned a bachelor's degree in sociology at age 62 from State University of New York. Also, she was a member of the San Diego Press Club. Upon her return to the US from England in 1990, she wrote articles for The Collector, Antiques and Collectibles, and West Coast Peddler. She also sold Royal Winton and chintz china pieces, which she had purchased in England, as a dealer at daughter Cordelia Mendoza's antiques store in Ocean Beach. California.

She and Jim Scott had five children, two of whom—J. Michael Scott and Cathy Scott—are also authors. Busby was also the sister of author and Orthodox Christian Hieromonk Father Seraphim Rose and the sister-in-law of former CIA Director Stansfield Turner. She died on April 6, 2005. She was remembered as "an author and antiques dealer."

== Books ==
- Royal Winton Porcelain: Ceramics Fit for a King 1998
- Cottage Ware: Ceramic Tableware Shaped As Buildings, 1920s-1990s 2003
- Computer Typing
- Quick-Quick Type: Ten Easy Lessons : A Short, Simple Beginner or Refresher Course With Handy Reference Section
