= H. brevirostris =

H. brevirostris may refer to:

- Hippocampus brevirostris, a synonym for Hippocampus hippocampus, the short-snouted seahorse, a seahorse species endemic to the Mediterranean Sea and parts of the North Atlantic, particularly around Italy and the Canary Islands
- Hyaenodon brevirostris, an extinct mammal species
