= James Melvin Scott =

- Born: 28 May 1911; Wisdom, Missouri
- Died: 30 December 2001 (aged 90); San Diego, California
- Resting place: San Diego, California
- Occupations: Author, inventor
- Spouse: Eileen Rose Busby (first wife)
- Children: J. Michael Scott, Cathy Scott, Cordelia Mendoza
- Relatives: Seraphim Rose (brother-in-law)
- Writing career
- Pen name: Scotty
- Language: English
- Genre: Autobiography
- Notable work: The Missouri Kid

James Melvin Scott (nicknamed Scotty, but also called Melvin and Jim) (1911–2001), an author, inventor, and Senior Olympian, was born in Wisdom, Missouri, on 28 May 1911, to James Baker Scott and Cordelia Susan Suiter. One of five children (one of whom died in infancy), he grew up in Fairfield, Missouri, seven miles south of Warsaw near Route 83. The town is now covered by water, which occurred in the early 1970s when the Harry S. Truman Dam and Reservoir began filling.

== Biography ==
He taught for five years in a one-room schoolhouse in Wisdom, Missouri. He attended Teacher's College in Liberty, Missouri, for two years to earn his teaching credential. He headed west in 1937, settling in San Diego two years later. One of his first jobs in San Diego was delivering milk door-to-door for Golden Arrow Dairy in a time when the milkman was part of daily life in America. In the late 1940s, while working for the dairy, he invented the Zip Whip—a device for whipping cream, which was featured in a book, The Eggbeater Chronicles. Scott switched from delivering milk to selling insurance and later became a real estate broker, which he continued doing well into his 80s.

== Sports ==
Scott played baseball during high school and, later, in a bush league against other counties. While still living in Fairfield, he became a local rodeo celebrity.

He began playing racquetball in the 1950s and was ranked a top player for many years. Upon turning 70, Scott played 70 racquetball games against 70 opponents over a 10-day period for $1 to $5 a point, raising more than $1,500 for the National Kidney Foundation. During the 1980s he won gold, silver and bronze medals in both singles and doubles competitions for players 70 years and older in the Senior Olympics. Scott also played basketball, and in 1995 won a free throw basketball competition in San Diego in the 80-to-85 age bracket.

He wrote a memoir, The Missouri Kid about growing up as a hillbilly in the Missouri Ozarks. He also wrote a pamphlet about salesmanship, which was published in the 1950s.

== Family ==
Scott married Eileen Rose Busby in 1940, and they had five children, including scientist J. Michael Scott, true crime author Cathy Scott, and antiques expert Cordelia Mendoza. After they divorced in 1966, he married Helen Scott.

== Book ==
Upon the release of Scott's memoir The Missouri Kid, Gateway Heritage Magazine wrote, "Scott's art of storytelling can turn ordinary history into captivating anecdotes. A fascinating, fun, quick read for anyone interested in taking a journey into the past."
