= Esther Rose (painter) =

American painter (1901–1990)

- Born: Esther Elvira Holbeck; April 1, 1901; Two Harbors, Minnesota, U.S.
- Died: July 16, 1990 (aged 89); La Mesa, California, U.S.
- Known for: Art
- Movement: Impressionism
- Children: 3, including Seraphim Rose and Eileen Rose Busby

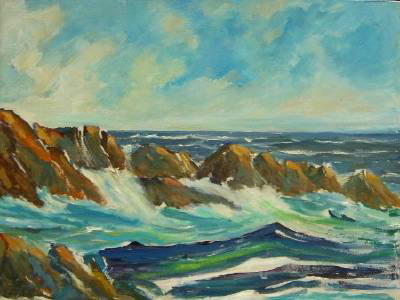
Esther Rose, Seascape of Carmel-by-the-Sea, California

Esther Elvina Rose (April 1, 1901 – July 16, 1990) was an American painter who worked in oils, collage, silkscreen and watercolors. She was best known for her impressionist renditions of California coastal images.

== Early life ==
Esther Elvina Holbeck was born in Two Harbors, Minnesota. Esther's parents were John and Hilma Holbeck. John emigrated from Norway in 1883 and Hilma in 1880. Hilma was born in Norway however her parents were Swedish. The third of five children all born in the United States, Esther's siblings were Ingwald J., Alma Ingeborg, Hilmar Arnold and Carl Wallace. In 1910 the family lived in Waldo, Lake County, Minnesota. They lived in Two Harbors, Minnesota, by 1920.

On July 9, 1921, Esther married Frank Archie Rose. Frank had served during World War I as a sergeant in the United States Army. He was an amateur photographer and had been a sports writer for the Two Harbors, Minnesota, newspaper. They settled in San Diego, California in 1924 and that year established the first Karmelkorn Shoppe in San Diego.

== Artistic career ==
Rose began painting at age 45. She studied under portraitist Frederick Taubes, seascape artist Bennett Bradbury and water color instructor J. Milford Ellison at the San Diego Art Institute.

She is particularly known for her seascapes of the California coast of an Impressionistic style, and she also made still life and landscape paintings. She painted with oils and watercolor. Aside from easel painting, Rose explored silk-screening, serigraphy, screenprinting, printmaking and collages.

Rose was a member of the West Coast Art Association, Central Coast Art Association, the Pacific Grove Art Association, in the Monterey area, and the Foothills Art Association in La Mesa, California.

== Personal life ==
Esther and Frank had three children. Eugene Dennis Rose became the Orthodox Christian Hieromonk known as Seraphim Rose. Eileen Rose Busby was an author and antiques expert and Frank Rose was a businessman. Grandchildren include scientist J. Michael Scott, antiques expert Cordelia Mendoza, and true crime author Cathy Scott. After the Roses retired, they moved to Carmel-by-the-Sea in Northern California. Her husband, Frank, died on July 30, 1968, and Esther Rose died in 1990 in La Mesa, California. Both are buried at the El Carmelo Cemetery, Pacific Grove, California.
