= Hogles Creek =

Stream in the American state of Missouri

Hogles Creek is a stream in Benton, Hickory and St. Clair counties in the U.S. state of Missouri. It is a tributary of the Osage River within Truman Lake.

The stream headwaters arise in Hickory County southwest of Wheatland and it flows west and northwest passing under US Route 54 and Missouri Route 83 and north passing west of Quincy. It enters the southwest corner of Benton County and crosses into St. Clair County and back into Benton Boone. It turns east and enters the waters of Truman Lake near the community of Wisdom.

Source: 37°55′40″N 93°24′41″W; Confluence: 38°10′44″N 93°24′46″W

Hogles Creek was named after John F. Hogle, a pioneer trader.

== See also ==
- List of rivers of Missouri
