= J. Michael Scott =

American scientist, professor, environmentalist and author

- Born: September 21, 1941 (age 84); San Diego, California
- Education: San Diego State University; Oregon State University
- Known for: Project leader, California Condor Research Center; Pioneered Gap Analysis Program; Distinguished emeritus professor
- Spouse: Sharon Scott
- Awards: American Ornithologist's Union Conservation Award (2006); U.S. Department of Interior's Distinguished Service Award (2006); Spirit of Defenders Award for Public Service from Defenders of Wildlife
- Scientific career
- Fields: Ornithology, environment

J. Michael Scott (born September 21, 1941) is an American scientist, professor, environmentalist and author.

== Early life and education ==
Scott is the eldest son of Eileen Rose Busby, an author and antiques expert, and Jim Scott, a Senior Olympics winner who helped pioneer and develop the game of racquetball. He is the grandson of California artist Esther Rose, the nephew of the late Russian Orthodox Hieromonk Seraphim Rose, brother of true crime author Cathy Scott and volunteer Cordelia Mendoza.

A graduate of San Diego County's Helix High School, Scott attended the University of Redlands for one year before earning his bachelor's and master's degrees in marine biology from San Diego State University and a doctorate in ornithology from Oregon State University.

== Career ==
He is a senior scientist with the U.S. Geological Survey, a leader with the Idaho Cooperative Fish and Wildlife Research and a professor of Fish and Wildlife Resources at the University of Idaho.

In 1963, Scott joined the Peace Corps and served a two-year stint in Cartago, Colombia, where he founded a natural history museum, started a Red Cross swimming program, and coached a number of sports.

From 1974 to 1984, Scott served as a research biologist for the U.S. Fish and Wildlife Service at Mauna Loa Field Station in Hawaii Volcanoes National Park. It was his first assignment with the U.S. Department of Interior. From 1984 to 1986, he served as project leader of the California Condor Research Center in Ventura. In 1986 he was appointed to his current position as leader of the Idaho Cooperative Fish and Wildlife Research Unit in Moscow, Idaho. In addition, he is a professor in the Department of Fish and Wildlife Resources at the University of Idaho, where he pioneered the Gap Analysis Program and served as program leader from 1989 to 1997.

Scott is an elected fellow of the American Association for the Advancement of Science and the American Ornithologists' Union. Also, he is a past president of both The Cooper Ornithological Society and the Pacific Seabird Group, and has served on the boards of a number of professional societies and the science advisory boards of several non-profit conservation organizations.

=== Awards ===
In April 2011, Scott was awarded the rank of Distinguished Emeritus Professor from the University of Idaho. The distinguished professor rank, which was given to two other professors in addition to Scott, was done to recognize "sustained excellence, as judged by peers, in scholarly, creative, and artistic achievement; breadth and depth of teaching in their discipline; and university service as well as service involving the application of scholarship, creative, or artistic activities that address the needs of one or more external publics," according to a news release. He received the American Ornithologist's Union 2006 Conservation Award, an International award presented for extraordinary scientific contributions by an individual to the conservation, restoration, or preservation of birds and their habitats. Scott is a past president of both The Cooper Ornithological Society and the Pacific Seabird Group, and has served on the boards of a number of professional societies and the science advisory boards of several non-profit conservation organizations.

In 2010, he was honored by the nonprofit Defenders of Wildlife with its Spirit of Defenders Award for Public Service.

In 2006, Scott received the U.S. Department of Interior's Distinguished Service Award, the highest award given to a career employee for a lifetime of service. Also, his professional accomplishments have been recognized by the Society for Conservation Biology with both the Distinguished Achievement Award and the Edward T. La Roe III Memorial Award. He received a Twentieth Century Environmental Achiever Award at the Ninth Lukac's Symposium.

== Books ==
- Forest bird communities of the Hawaiian Islands, 1986
- Estimating number of terrestrial birds 1986, with C.J. Ralph, repint 2003)
- Evolution, ecology, conservation and management of Hawaiian birds: A vanishing avifauna (2001, with S. Conant and C. Van Ripper III)
- Predicting species occurrences: Issues of accuracy and scale (2002, with Pat Hegland and others)
- The Endangered Species Act at 30, Vol. I: Renewing the conservation promise (2005, with D. Goble and F.W. Davis)
- The Endangered Species Act at Thirty, Vol. II: Conserving biodiversity in human dominated landscapes (2006, with D. Goble and F.W. Davis)

== See also ==
- List of San Diego State University alumni and faculty
