= Jamie Scott (disambiguation) =

Jamie Scott (born 1984) is an English singer, songwriter and producer.

Jamie Scott may also refer to:

- Jamie Scott (One Tree Hill), television series character
- Jamie Scott (basketball) (born 1994), American-Canadian basketball player
- Jamie Aleshia Scott, American politician
- Jamie Scott, of the Scott sisters, convicted of a 1993 armed robbery
- Jamie Scott, American bass guitarist, member of many bands including Vain, Road Crew and Vaughn

== See also ==
- James Scott (disambiguation)
- Jim Scott (disambiguation), / includes Jimmy Scott disambiguation
