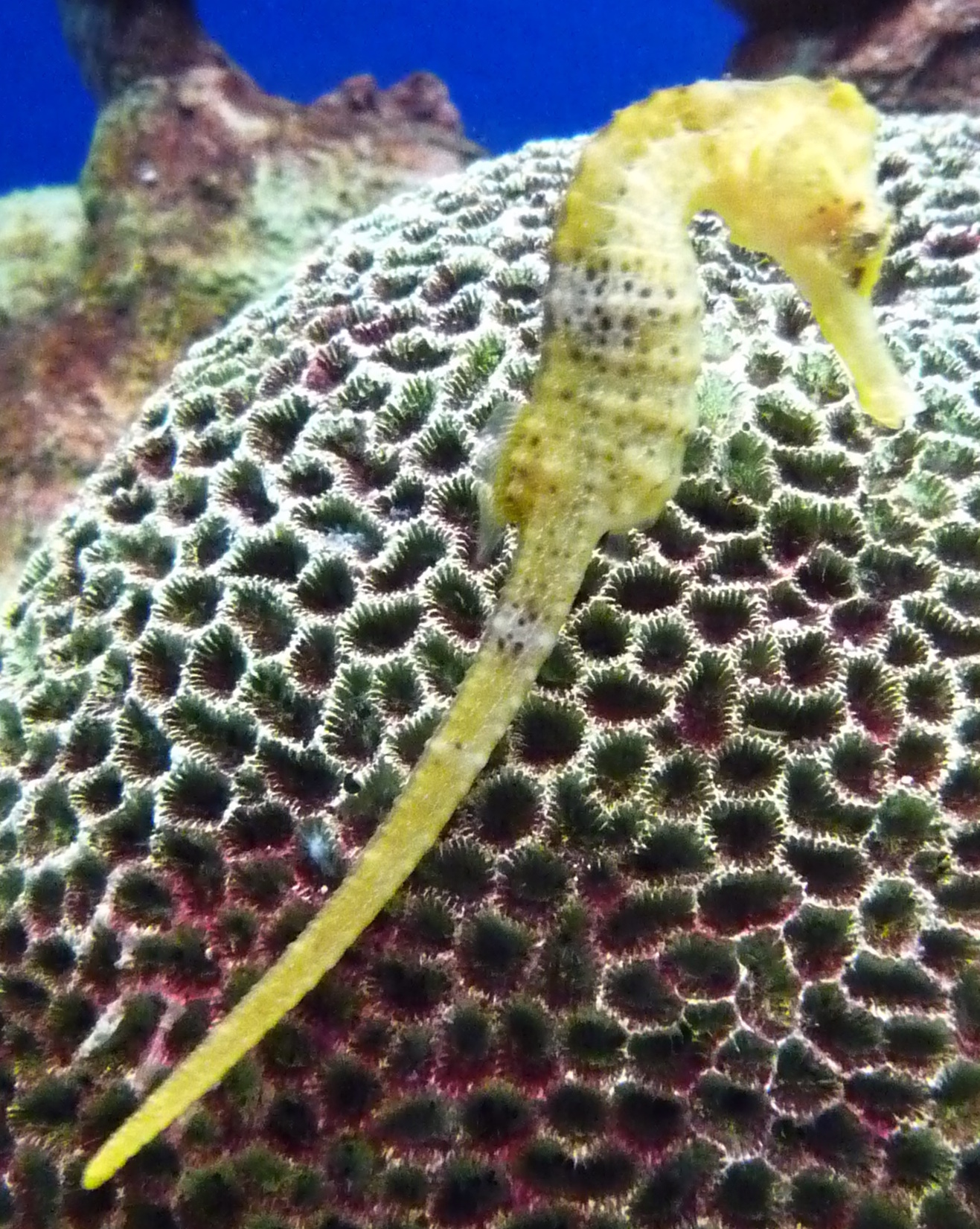

Conservation status
- Data Deficient (IUCN 3.1)
- CITES Appendix II

Scientific classification
- Kingdom: Animalia
- Phylum: Chordata
- Class: Actinopterygii
- Division: Teleostei
- Order: Syngnathiformes
- Family: Syngnathidae
- Genus: Hippocampus
- Species: H. guttulatus

Binomial name
- Hippocampus guttulatus (G. Cuvier, 1829)

Synonyms
- Hippocampus longirostris Schinz, 1822; Hippocampus ramulosus Leach, 1814; Hippocampus bicuspis Kaup, 1856; Hippocampus filamentosus Duméril, 1870

= Long-snouted seahorse =

Species of fish

Hippocampus guttulatus, commonly known as the long-snouted seahorse and in Great Britain as the spiny seahorse, is a marine fish belonging to the family Syngnathidae. It is native to the northeast Atlantic, including the Mediterranean.

== Synonyms ==
H. hippocampus microstephanus Slastenenko 1937; H. hippocampus microcoronatus Slastenenko 1938; H. guttulatus multiannularis Ginsburg 1937; H biscuspis Kaup 1856.

== Description ==
The long-snouted seahorse is a small-sized fish that can reach a maximum length of 21.5 cm (8 1/2 in), but the average size is approximately 12 cm (5 in). The body is slender, the snout is long and the tail is prehensile. Its head and dorsal ridge often have many long dermal filaments which can be simple or bifid. Its color ranges from dark green to different variants of brown to yellow, and the body is often speckled with small white dots.

== Distribution and habitat ==
The long-snouted seahorse is widespread throughout the temperate waters of the eastern Atlantic Ocean from the south coast of the United Kingdom to the Netherlands and south to Morocco, including the Canary Islands, the Azores and Madeira, Italy and the Mediterranean Sea.

The longsnout seahorse ranges from black to yellow, red, orange and brown with multiple white dots usually on the tail.

This seahorse likes shallow coastal waters from 1 to 20 m (3 to 66 ft) deep. It occurs close by Posidonia and seagrass meadows or in mixed habitat with sandy bottom and rocks with algae.

== Biology ==
The long-snouted seahorse has a carnivorous diet and feeds on small crustaceans, larvae, fish eggs and other planktonic organisms. It is ovoviviparous and it is the male who broods the eggs in its ventral brood pouch. The latter includes villi rich in capillaries that surround each fertilized egg, creating a sort of placenta supplying the embryos. When fully grown, the young, called fry, will be expelled from the pocket and mature in complete autonomy. Many seahorse species are monogamous as mating occurs between the same two partners in one breeding season. However, the mating habits for H. guttulatus are unknown. An interesting aspect of seahorse coloration is the ability to rapidly transform color patterns to blend with their immediate surroundings. They swim upright and avoid predators by mimicking the colour of underwater plants.

== Conservation status ==
The long-snouted seahorse is relatively rare, and limited data exists on its population and about the volume and the impact of trade for traditional Chinese medicine and for the aquarium. The species is therefore considered as "Data Deficient" on the IUCN Red List. Internationally, it is also listed in Appendix II of the Convention on International Trade in Endangered Species of Wild Fauna and Flora (CITES). This means that it is on the list of species not necessarily threatened with extinction, but for which trade must be controlled in order to avoid utilization incompatible with their survival. A haven for this species was set up in Studland Bay, Devon, England. It was designated as a Marine Conservation Zone in 2019. Human activities influenced 42% of the habitat suitability of H. guttulatus, while only 30% of their potential distributions is protected by Italy's existing conservation area system, in accordance with the global average for seahorses. In particular, the central Adriatic Sea represents a critical area where the occurrence of this seahorses is lower and the anthropic impact is higher.

== See also ==
- Hippocampus hippocampus
