= John of Shanghai and San Francisco =

Russian ascetic and saint (1896–1966)

Saint John of Shanghai and San Francisco
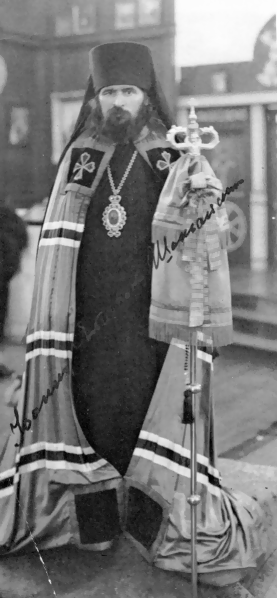
- John on his 1934 arrival in Shanghai

Archbishop of Shanghai, Western Europe and San Francisco, Wonderworker, Venerable
- Born: Mikhail Borisovich Maximovitch; 4 June 1896; Adamovka, Izyumsky Uyezd, Kharkov Governorate, Russian Empire
- Died: 2 July 1966 (aged 70); Seattle, Washington, United States
- Venerated in: Eastern Orthodox Church
- Canonized: July 2, 1994, San Francisco, California, United States by the Holy Synod of the Russian Orthodox Church Outside Russia
- Major shrine: Cathedral of the Theotokos, Joy of All Who Sorrow, San Francisco, California, United States
- Feast: July 2 [O.S. June 19] (nearest Saturday to July 2 in ROCOR)

John of Shanghai and San Francisco (Russian: Иоанн Шанхайский и Сан-Францисский, romanized: Ioann Shankhayskiy i San-Frantsisskiy; born Mikhail Borisovich Maximovitch, Russian: Михаил Борисович Максимович; June 4, 1896 – July 2, 1966) was a prelate of the Russian Orthodox Church Outside Russia who is venerated as a saint in the Eastern Orthodox Church.

He is also referred to as "John, the Wonderworker" and John Maximovitch.

== Life ==
=== Early life ===
Mikhail Maximovitch was born on June 4, 1896, in the village of Adamovka of the Izyumsky Uyezd of the Kharkov Governorate of the Russian Empire (in present-day eastern Ukraine).

Growing up, he collected icons and church books, and indulged heavily in the reading of the lives of saints. As a child, he converted his French caretaker from Catholicism to Eastern Orthodoxy.

Maximovitch attended Poltava Military School from 1907 to 1914. Later, he attended and received a degree in law from Kharkov Imperial University in 1918. He studied and attended church in Kharkiv, where he was inspired by Metropolitan Antony Khrapovitsky to deepen his religious understanding. He later recalled that the local monastery had become more important in his life than secular institutions.

=== Yugoslavia ===
John's family moved to Yugoslavia and brought him to Belgrade in 1921. In 1925, Maximovitch graduated from Belgrade University with a degree in theology. To support his impoverished family, he sold newspapers.

In 1926, he was tonsured and ordained a hierodeacon by Russian Metropolitan Anthony (Khrapovitsky), who gave him the name of John after his distant ancestor, John of Tobolsk.

Later that same year, he was ordained to the priesthood by Russian Bishop Gabriel (Chepur) of Chelyabinsk. After his ordination, John reportedly stopped sleeping in a bed and only ate once a day. For several years, he worked as an instructor and tutor in Yugoslavia. He worked as a religious teacher in the Gymnasium of Velika Kikinda between 1925 and 1927. In 1929, the Holy Synod of the Serbian Orthodox Church appointed him as a teacher of the seminary in Bitola under principal Nikolaj Velimirović. His reputation grew as he began to visit hospitals, in which he cared for patients with prayer and communion.

=== Shanghai ===
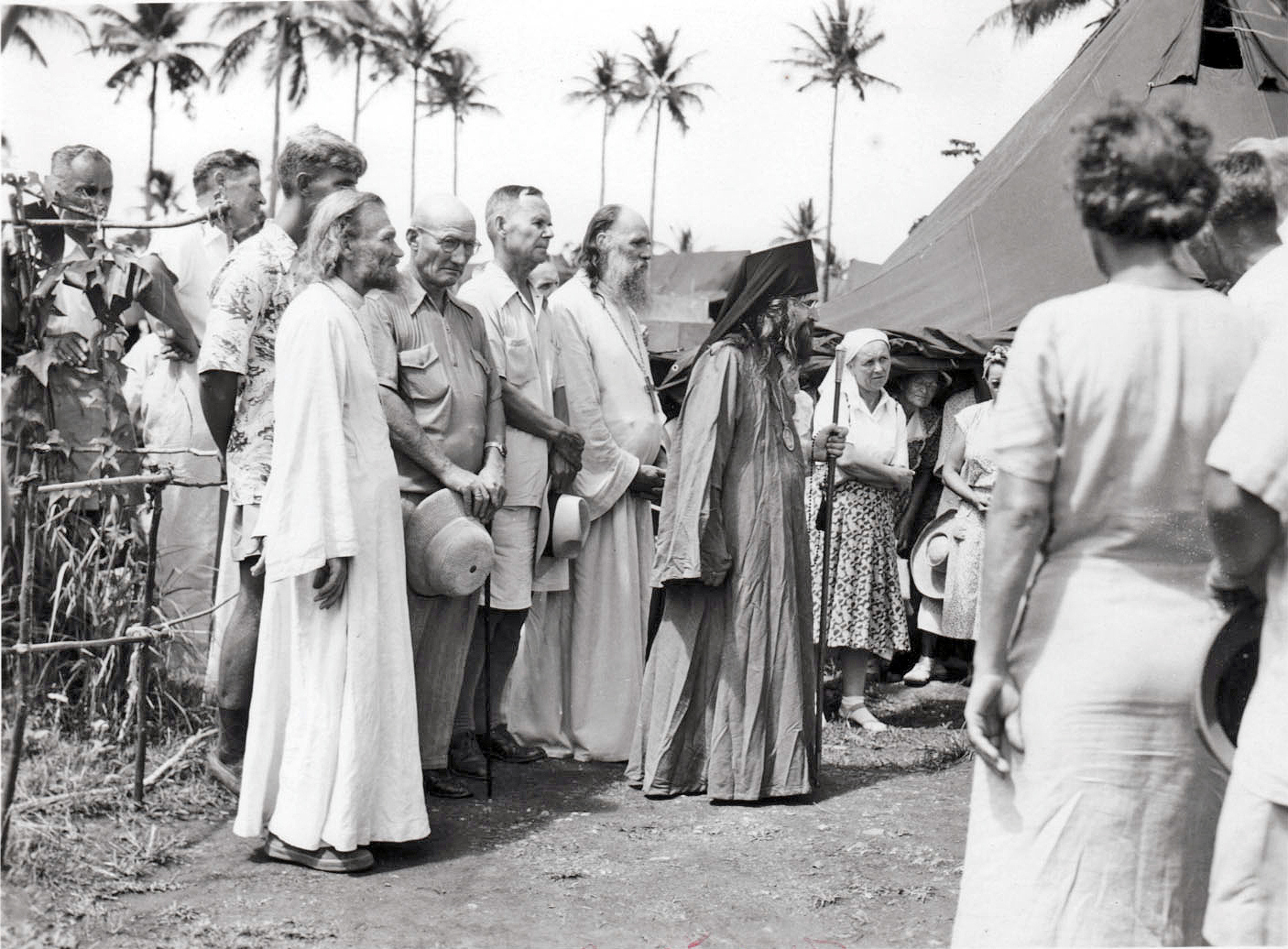
Archbishop John with Russian refugees on Tubabao Island

In 1934, he was ordained a bishop of the Russian Orthodox Church Outside Russia by Metropolitan Anthony and assigned to the diocese of Shanghai. In Shanghai, John found the uncompleted Saint Nicholas' Church and an Orthodox community deeply divided along ethnic lines. He became involved in local charitable institutions and later founded an orphanage and home for children of the destitute.

He worked to restore church unity and establish ties with local Orthodox Serbs and Greeks. Miracles reportedly began to be attributed to his prayers.

As a public figure, it was impossible for him to completely hide his ascetic way of life. During the Japanese occupation, he routinely ignored the curfew in pursuit of his pastoral work.

Being the only Russian hierarch in China who refused to submit to the authority of the Soviet-dominated Russian Orthodox Church, under Patriarch Alexy I of Moscow, he was elevated in 1946 to archbishop of China by the Holy Synod of the Russian Orthodox Church Outside Russia.

When the Communists took power in China in 1949, the Russian enclave was forced to leave, first to a refugee camp on the island of Tubabao in the Philippines, and then to Australia and the United States. Maximovitch traveled to Washington, D.C., in order to ensure that his followers would be allowed to enter the US under refugee status. Following this, a bill, H.R. 4567, was signed by President Truman on June 16, 1950, which included a provision to allow 4,000 Europeans in the Far East to become refugees in the United States.

=== Western Europe ===
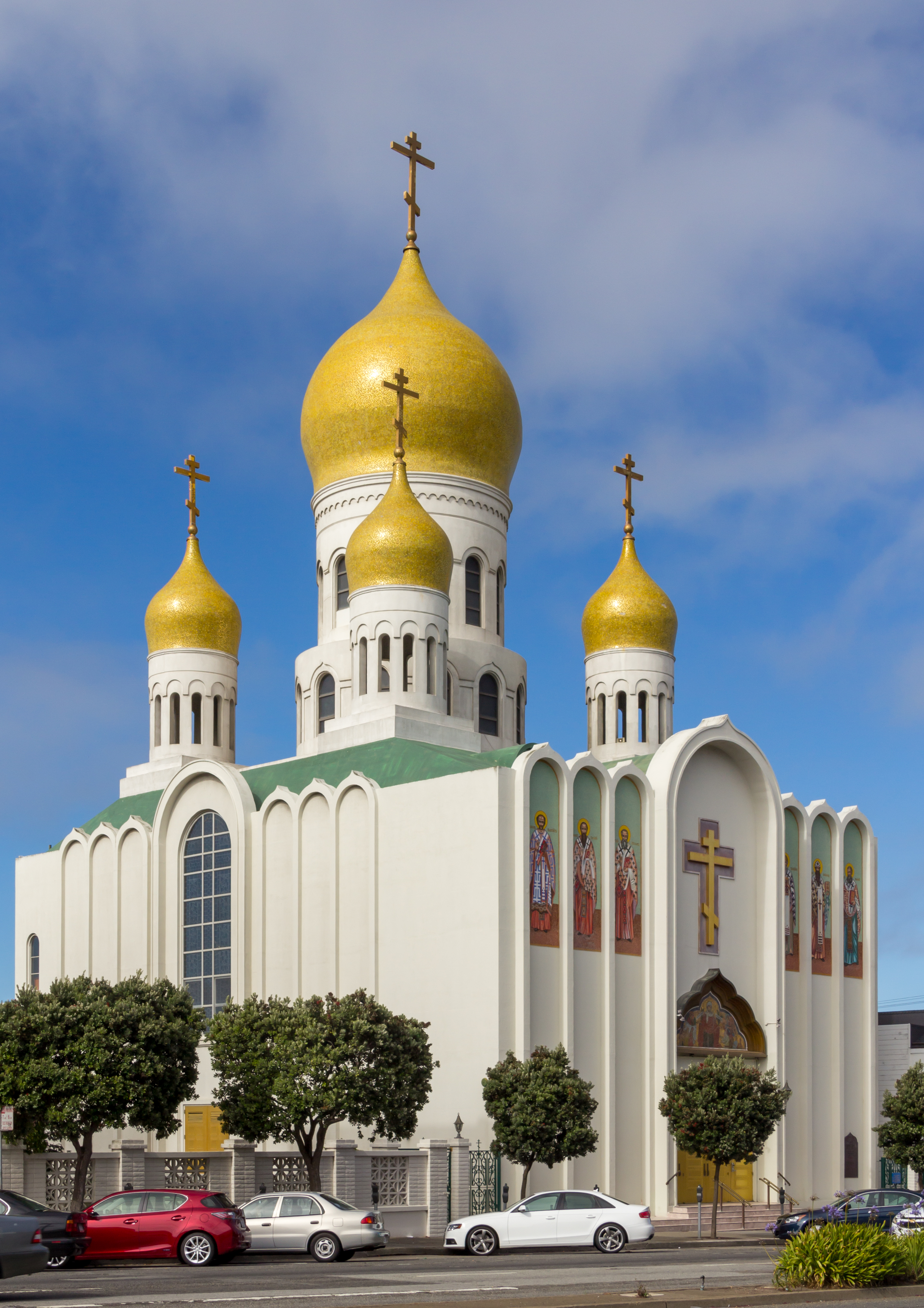
Holy Virgin Cathedral in San Francisco

In 1951, John was assigned to the Archdiocese of Western Europe with his see first in Paris, then in Brussels. His work in compiling the lives of saints introduced numerous pre-Schism Western saints to Orthodoxy, where they continue to be venerated.

=== San Francisco ===
In 1962, John was reassigned by the Holy Synod of the Russian Church Abroad to the see over San Francisco. He found a divided community and an uncompleted cathedral. Although he completed the building of the Holy Virgin Cathedral and brought some measure of tranquility to the community, he was slandered by political enemies, who filed a lawsuit against him for alleged mishandling of finances related to the construction of the cathedral. He was eventually exonerated.

Deeply reverent and interested in John of Kronstadt, Maximovitch played an active role in the preparation of his canonization in 1964.

== Death and veneration ==
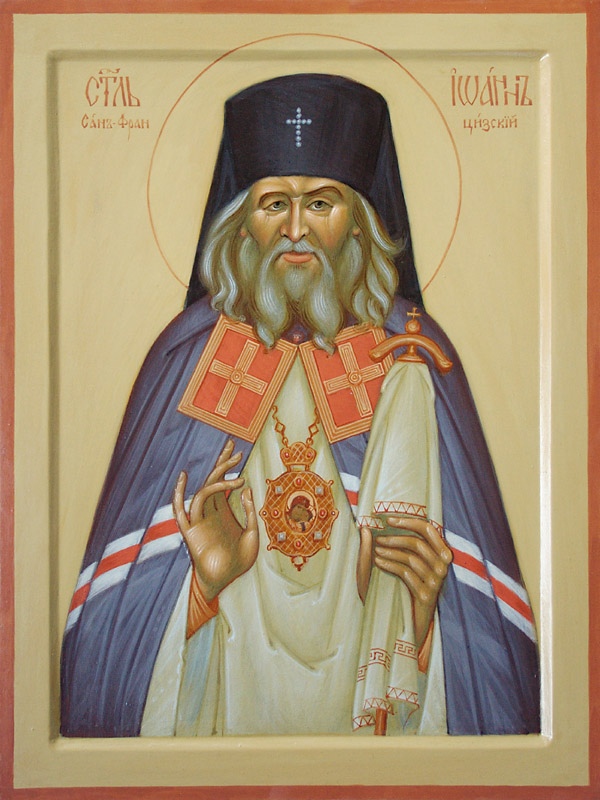
Icon of St. John of Shanghai and San Francisco

=== Death ===
On July 2, 1966 (June 19 on the Julian calendar), John died while visiting Seattle. He was entombed beneath the altar of the Holy Virgin Cathedral, which he had built in San Francisco. It is dedicated to the Theotokos, Joy of All Who Sorrow, and the cathedral is located on Geary Boulevard in the Richmond district.

=== Veneration ===
He was glorified by the Russian Orthodox Church Outside of Russia on July 2, 1994, the 28th anniversary of his death. The Orthodox Church of America commemorates his feast day on July 2 each year. In the Russian Church Abroad, Maximovitch's feast day is celebrated on the Saturday nearest to July 2.

On July 2, 2008, the Patriarchate of Moscow recognized ROCOR's canonization for universal veneration.

=== Relics and miracles ===
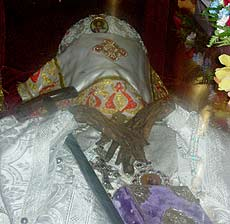
The incorrupt relics of St. John

John's relics are considered to be incorrupt. Witnesses reported that it did not decompose between his death, and initial burial. When the body of John was exhumed and examined in 1993, there were similar findings of his relics being incorrupt.

His relics occupy a shrine in the Holy Virgin Cathedral's nave in San Francisco. Portions of his relics are located in Spain, Serbia, Russia, Mount Athos, Greece, South Korea, Bulgaria, Romania, Canada, United Kingdom, North Macedonia, and other countries.

Seraphim Rose and Herman Podmoshensky recorded about 100 different miracles attributed to John and his intercessions. In his own lifetime, he was known by some to have powers of healing and clairvoyance.
