= James Scott (antiquarian) =

Scottish minister and antiquarian

James Scott (1733–1818) was a Scottish minister and antiquarian who founded the Literary and Antiquarian Society.

== Life ==
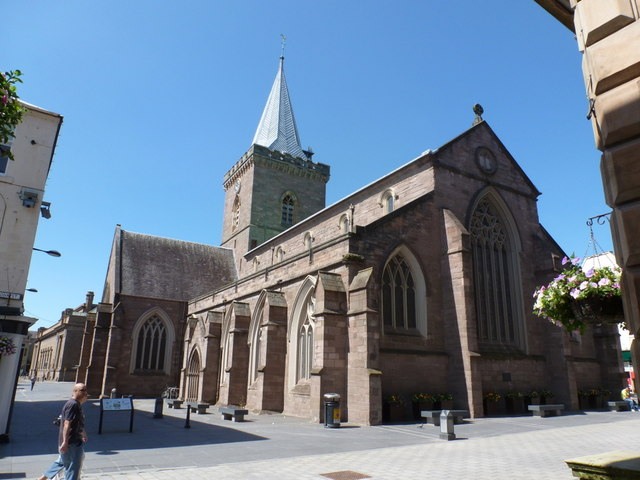
St John's Kirk in central Perth

Scott was born at Crowhill near Falnash the second son of Robert Scott of Falnash (d. 1734) and Violet Rutherford on 21 November 1733. He was educated at the High School in Edinburgh then studied at Edinburgh University. He was licensed to preach as a Church of Scotland minister by the Presbytery of Jedburgh in September 1758.

In September 1759 he was ordained as minister of Kinfauns. In November 1762 he translated to "second charge" of St John's Kirk in Perth, under David Black (son of Thomas Black). Om Black's death in 1771 Scott was promoted to "first charge".

In 1784 he founded the Literary and Antiquarian Society which wrote papers and lectured on various historical figures and events linked to Perth and Scotland. He translated several manuscripts from Latin into English.

He retired on grounds of infirmity in December 1807 and his position was filled briefly by Patrick Slight before Andrew Mitchell Thomson filled the role. Scott died in Perth on 27 April 1818. His collection of manuscripts passed to the Advocates Library in Edinburgh after his death. Some are held by the National Library of Scotland.

== Family ==
In August 1760 Scott married Beatrix Mercer (d.1806) daughter of Thomas Mercer of Pinhill. They had several children:

- Robert (b. 1762), died in infancy
- Thomas Scott (1763–1814)
- Elizabeth (b. 1765)
- Violet (1766–1770), died in childhood
- Susanna (1767–1854)
- James Scott (b. 1769), a merchant in Glasgow

== Publications ==
- A History of the Lives of the Protestant Reformers in Scotland (1810)
- History of the Life and Death of John, Earl of Gowrie (1818)
- Essays on Evangelical Subjects (1824, posthumously)
- Statistical Account of the Parish

He contributed to two magazines: The Religious Monitor and Christian Instructor.

== Artistic recognition ==
His portrait by "Thomson" is held by Perth and Kinross Council.
