= James Scott (cardiologist) =

British cardiologist

Professor James Scott FRS FRCP FIBiol FMedSci
- Born: 1946 (age 79–80); United Kingdom
- Education: London Hospital
- Occupation: Cardiologist
- Employer: Imperial College London
- Known for: Cardiology
- Awards: Fellow of the Royal Society (1997)

James Scott (born 1946) is a British cardiologist.

Scott undertook training at the London Hospital and in Birmingham, then in 1975 took up a position the Academic Department of Medicine at the Royal Free Hospital.

From 1975 to 1980, Scott was a Medical Research Council Research Fellow and Honorary Senior Registrar at the Royal Postgraduate Medical School. He followed this with stints as a European Molecular Biology Fellow at the University of California, San Francisco (1980–1983) and MRC Clinical Scientist and Honorary Consultant Physician at the MRC Clinical Research Centre, Northwick Park Hospital (1983–1991).

From 1992, Scott was Honorary Consultant Physician at the Hammersmith Hospital; he was Professor and Chairman of Medicine at the Royal Postgraduate Medical School (1992–1998); and from 1998 Director of the Genetics and Genomics Institute, Imperial College, and Professor of Cardiovascular Medicine at the National Heart and Lung Institute, Imperial College London.

He was elected a Fellow of the Royal Society (FRS) in 1997.
