= Wisdom, Missouri =

- Unincorporated community
- Location within Missouri Location within the United States
- Coordinates: 38°10′01″N 93°28′37″W
- Country: United States
- State: Missouri
- County: Benton
- Elevation: 764 ft (233 m)
- Time zone: UTC-6 (Central (CST))
  - Summer (DST): UTC-5 (CDT)
- Area code: 660
- GNIS feature ID: 741369

Wisdom is an unincorporated community in southwest Benton County, Missouri, United States. Wisdom is located on the Hogles Creek arm of Truman Lake. It is 7.4 miles (11.9 km) southwest of Warsaw.

== History ==
A post office called Wisdom was established in 1897, and remained in operation until 1956. The community was named for A. J. Wisdom, a settler.
