= Jim Scott (American football) =

Biographical details
- Education: Luther (IA)

Coaching career (HC unless noted)
- 1986–2004: Aurora

Head coaching record
- Overall: 102–70–3
- Tournaments: 0–3 (NCAA D-III playoffs)

Accomplishments and honors

Championships
- 4 IBFC (1998–2000, 2004)

Awards
- Aurora Hall of Fame (2013)

James Scott is a retired American football coach. He served as the head football coach at Aurora University from 1986 to 2004. Scott revitalized a program that hadn't fielded a team since 1951. After his retirement from coaching, Scott remained on staff at Aurora as an algebra instructor.

== Head coaching record ==
Year	Team	Overall	Conference	Standing	Bowl/playoffs
Aurora Spartans (NCAA Division III independent) (1986–1997)
1986	Aurora	1–4			
1987	Aurora	4–5			
1988	Aurora	7–2			
1989	Aurora	8–1			
1990	Aurora	5–4			
1991	Aurora	5–3–1			
1992	Aurora	9–1			L NCAA Division III First Round
1993	Aurora	4–5			
1994	Aurora	2–5–2			
1995	Aurora	3–6			
1996	Aurora	5–4			
1997	Aurora	4–5			
Aurora Spartans (Illini–Badger Football Conference) (1998–2004)
1998	Aurora	7–3	7–0	1st	
1999	Aurora	8–2	7–0	1st	
2000	Aurora	7–4	7–0	1st	L NCAA Division III First Round
2001	Aurora	7–2	6–1	2nd	
2002	Aurora	5–4	5–2	3rd	
2003	Aurora	5–5	5–2	3rd	
2004	Aurora	6–5	6–1	T–1st	L NCAA Division III First Round
Aurora:		102–70–3	43–6		
Total:		102–70–3			
