= James Scott (footballer, born 1905) =

Scottish footballer

Personal information
- Full name: James Archibald Brown Scott
- Date of birth: 11 November 1905
- Place of birth: Partick, Scotland
- Position: Centre half

Senior career*
Years	Team	Apps	(Gls)
1932–1935	Queen's Park	10	(0)

International career
1936	Scotland Amateurs	1	(0)
- * Club domestic league appearances and goals

James Archibald Brown Scott was a Scottish amateur football centre half who played in the Scottish League for Queen's Park. He was capped by Scotland at amateur level.
