= James Scott (footballer, born 1881) =

Scottish footballer

Personal information
- Date of birth: 1881
- Position: Goalkeeper

Senior career*
Years	Team	Apps	(Gls)
- St Mirren
1905–1906	Bradford City	2	(0)
Total		2	(0)
- * Club domestic league appearances and goals

James Scott (born 1881) was a Scottish professional footballer who played as a goalkeeper.

== Career ==
Scott moved from St Mirren to Bradford City in November 1905. He made 2 league appearances for the club, before being released in 1906.

== Sources ==
- Frost, Terry (1988). Bradford City A Complete Record 1903-1988. Breedon Books Sport. ISBN 0-907969-38-0.
