= James Scott (police officer) =

James Scott (24 May 1899 – 10 May 1966) was an Irish police officer (Garda 4173) who was the twentieth recipient of the Scott Medal.

A native of Accony, Louisburgh, County Mayo, Scott joined the Garda Síochána on 25 April 1923. He was awarded the Scott Medal in recognition of his "exceptional courage in rescuing a German sailor from drowning" at Cobh, County Cork, on 21 December 1930. The award was made on 28 July 1931. Garda Scott retired on 23 May 1962, having served the rest of his time in Cork.
