= Jumbo Scott =

Scotland international rugby union player

- Full name: James William Scott
- Born: 24 September 1903
- Died: 24 September 1949 (aged 46) St Helens, England
- School: Daniel Stewart's College
- Occupation: Glass manufacturer

Rugby union career
- Position: Forward
International career
Years	Team	Apps	(Points)
1925–30	Scotland	18	(6)

James William "Jumbo" Scott (24 September 1903 — 24 August 1949) was a Scottish international rugby union player.

Scott was educated at Daniel Stewart's College and played for Stewart's College FP.

A long-limbed, but mobile forward, Scott made his Scotland debut in the 1925 Five Nations, playing all four matches as they claimed the grand slam for the first time. He was a regular fixture in the team from 1925 to 1928, then played a solitary match in both of the next two years, to finish with 18 international caps.

Scott, who worked for a glass manufacturing firm, ended his career playing for Bradford RFC and remained in the north of England post rugby. He was on the Lancashire committee and served as president of the St Helens RUFC.

== See also ==
- List of Scotland national rugby union players
