= James Scott (priest) =

James Scott was an Irish Anglican priest who was the Archdeacon of Dublin from 1883 to 1908.

Scott was educated at Trinity College, Dublin and ordained in 1853. After curacies in Athboy and Dublin he was the rector and Vicar of Bray. He died in January 1912.
