= James V. Scott =

Canadian minister and activist

James Vincent Scott
- Born: 1949 (age 76–77); Toronto, Ontario
- Occupations: Minister; Activist
- Years active: 1976-2015
- Known for: United Church of Canada General Council Officer for Residential Schools
- Awards: Officer of the Order of Canada; Honorary doctorate, UTC; Honorary doctorate, VST

James V. Scott OC is a Canadian ordained minister in the United Church of Canada. Scott is known for advocating for reform of Canada's criminal justice system through collaborative and restorative justice, as well as for his role in the truth and reconciliation process with Indigenous peoples in Canada. As the United Church General Council Officer for Residential Schools, he was tasked with implementing the 1986 and 1998 Apologies issued by the United Church regarding its role in the Canadian Indian residential school system, as well as representing the United Church in negotiations for the Indian Residential Schools Settlement Agreement and the Truth and Reconciliation Commission of Canada. For this work he was awarded two honorary doctorates, and inducted into the Order of Canada. In 2021, Scott received the Emmanuel Theological College Alumni/ae Service Award.

== Early life and education ==
Scott attended Victoria College in the University of Toronto, graduating in 1973 with a BA in religious studies. He then pursued a Master of Divinity at Emmanuel College, Toronto in the University of Toronto, graduating three years later in 1976. Scott was ordained by the United Church of Canada in the same year. After completing his graduate studies, he worked for four years in a pastoral ministry in Saskatchewan.

== Career ==
Scott began to work on restorative justice activism in 1980. During the early 1980s, he actively campaigned against the proliferation of nuclear weapons. In 1985, an effort to reverse the 1976 abolition of the death penalty in Canada motivated Scott to coordinate a national campaign in opposition to the death penalty, until 1987 when the attempt to restore the death penalty was defeated in the Parliament of Canada. In 1998, Scott became the founding coordinator of the Collaborative Justice Project in Ottawa, which promotes the use of a restorative justice approach and methodologies in cases of serious crime.

In addition to his work on collaborative and restorative justice, Scott has worked extensively on the Truth and Reconciliation process. From 2003 until 2015, he was the General Council Officer for Residential Schools for The United Church of Canada. He led the church in living out its Apologies of 1986 and 1998. In this capacity he was the lead national staff person representing the church in negotiations for the Indian Residential School Settlement Agreement and in the implementation of the Truth and Reconciliation Commission of Canada. Scott's work has been cited in academic studies of the Truth and Reconciliation process, and in official reports on its findings.

Scott retired in 2015. Since then, he has been awarded two honorary doctorates. In May 2017, he received an honorary doctorate from the United Theological College in Montreal, awarded for work relating to the Indian Residential Schools Settlement Agreement. The following year, he received an honorary doctorate from the Vancouver School of Theology for his "significant role in the recent Truth and Reconciliation Commission of Canada".

In December 2019, Scott was made an Officer of the Order of Canada, which is the second highest rank in the second highest order for merit among the orders, decorations, and medals of Canada. The award was given "for his leadership in advancing reconciliation with Indigenous Peoples in Canada and for his advocacy of restorative justice."

In 2022, Scott was appointed to the Steering Committee for the Residential Schools National Monument by the Department of Canadian Heritage.

== Awards and honours ==
- Honorary doctorate, United Theological College in Montreal (2017)
- Honorary doctorate, Vancouver School of Theology (2018)
- Officer of the Order of Canada (2019)
- Emmanuel Theological College Alumni/ae Service Award (2021)
