= James Scott (cricketer) =

English cricketer

Personal information
- Full name: James Beattie Scott
- Born: 27 November 1978 (age 47); Hammersmith, London, England
- Batting: Left-handed
- Bowling: Left-arm medium-fast

Domestic team information
- Years: Team
- 2001: Cambridge UCCE
- 2001: Cambridge University

Career statistics
Competition	First-class
Matches	4
Runs scored	27
Batting average	6.75
100s/50s	–/–
Top score	14
Balls bowled	518
Wickets	4
Bowling average	80.00
5 wickets in innings	–
10 wickets in match	–
Best bowling	1/33
Catches/stumpings	–/–
- Source: Cricinfo, 2 September 2020

James Beattie Scott (born 27 November 1978) is an English former first-class cricketer.

Scott was born at Hammersmith in November 1978 and was educated at Radley College, before going up to Downing College, Cambridge. While studying at Cambridge he made four appearances in first-class cricket in 2001, playing three times for Cambridge UCCE, including in the sides inaugural first-class match against Kent, in addition to playing for Cambridge University against Oxford University in The University Match at Fenner's. (Note: Cambridge UCCE differed from Cambridge University Cricket Club in that it was open to students at Anglia Ruskin University, whereas Cambridge University Cricket Club is exclusively for students of the constituent colleges of the University of Cambridge.) Playing as a left-arm medium-fast bowler, he took 4 wickets in his four matches at a high average of 80.00 and with best figures of 1 for 33.
