= Seraphim Rose =

American Orthodox monk and writer (1934–1982)

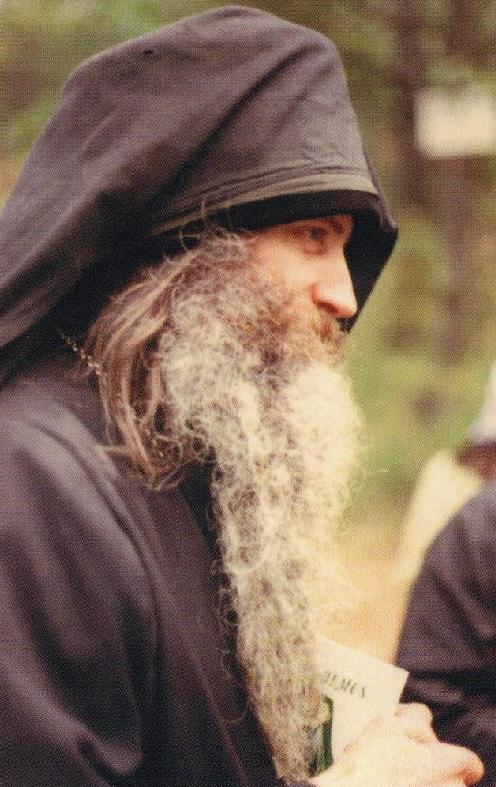
- Rose in monastic dress
- Title: Hieromonk

Personal life
- Born: Eugene Dennis Rose; August 13, 1934 San Diego, California, US
- Died: September 2, 1982 (aged 48) Platina, California, US
- Parent: Esther Rose
- Notable work: Orthodoxy and the Religion of the Future
- Education: Pomona College (BA) University of California, Berkeley (MA)
- Relatives: Eileen Rose Busby (sister); Cathy Scott (niece); J. Michael Scott (nephew)

Religious life
- Religion: Eastern Orthodoxy
- Church: Russian Orthodox Church Outside of Russia
- Founder of: Saint Herman of Alaska Monastery
- Monastic name: Seraphim
- Ordination: Tonsured a monk in October 1970; Ordained a priest in 1977 by Bishop Nektary of Seattle

Seraphim Rose (born Eugene Dennis Rose; August 13, 1934 – September 2, 1982), also known as Seraphim of Platina, was an American priest and hieromonk of the Russian Orthodox Church Outside Russia who co-founded the Saint Herman of Alaska Monastery in Platina, California. He translated Eastern Orthodox Christian texts and authored several works. His writings have been credited with helping to spread Eastern Orthodox Christianity throughout the West; his popularity equally extended to Russia itself, where his works were secretly reproduced and distributed by samizdat during the Communist era, remaining popular today.

Rose's opposition to Eastern Orthodox participation in the ecumenical movement and his advocacy of the contentious "toll house teaching" led him into conflict with mainstream orthodoxy. In May 2026, the Russian Orthodox Church Outside of Russia approved commencing the process required for the canonization of Rose. Some Eastern Orthodox Christians venerate him in iconography, liturgy and prayer.

Rose's monastery is currently affiliated with the Serbian Orthodox Church and continues to carry on his work of publishing and Eastern Orthodox missionary activity.

== Early life ==
Eugene Rose was born on August 13, 1934, in San Diego, California. His father, Frank Rose, was a World War I veteran who operated the city's first "Karmel Korn Shop" together with his wife Esther Rose, Eugene's mother. His ancestors had come to the United States from France, Norway and the Netherlands.

In addition to being a businesswoman, Esther was a California artist who specialized in impressionist renderings of Pacific coast scenes. Raised in San Diego, Eugene would remain a Californian the rest of his life. His older sister was Eileen Rose Busby, an author, Mensa member, and antiques expert; his older brother was Frank Rose, a local businessman.

Though Rose was described by one biographer as a "natural athlete" in his youth, he did not engage seriously in sport. Baptized in a Methodist church when he was 14 years old, Rose later rejected Christianity for atheism. After graduating from San Diego High School in 1952, he attended Pomona College, where he studied Chinese philosophy and graduated magna cum laude in 1956. While at Pomona, he was a reader for Ved Mehta, a blind student who would go on to become a well-known author. Mehta referred to Rose in two books, one of which was a book of memoirs called Stolen Light: "I felt very lucky to have found Gene as a reader. ... He read with such clarity that I almost had the illusion that he was explaining things." Afterward, Rose studied under Alan Watts at the American Academy of Asian Studies before entering the master's degree program in Oriental languages at the University of California, Berkeley, where he graduated in 1961 with a thesis entitled 'Emptiness' and 'Fullness' in the Lao Tzu.

In addition to a gift for languages, Rose was known for possessing an acute sense of humor and wit. He enjoyed opera, concerts, art, literature, and the other cultural opportunities richly available in San Francisco, where he settled after his graduation and explored Buddhism and other Asian philosophies.

== Spiritual search ==
While studying at Watts' Asian institute, Rose read the writings of French metaphysicist René Guénon and also met a Chinese Taoist scholar, Gi-ming Shien. Shien emphasized the ancient Chinese approach to learning, valuing traditional viewpoints and texts over more modern interpretations. Inspired by Shien, Rose took up the study of ancient Chinese so that he could read early Taoist texts in their original tongue. Through his experiences with Shien and the writings of Guénon, Rose sought out an authentic and grounded spiritual tradition of his own.

At age 22 in 1956 and while he was still at Pomona College, Rose came out as gay. During a romantic relationship with Jon Gregerson, Rose was exposed to the Russian Orthodox Church Outside of Russia. While the relationship lasted a significant period, Gregerson lost interest in Orthodoxy despite Rose's growing interest. Rose ultimately terminated the relationship and later commented on the period prior to his conversion, saying "I was in hell. I know what hell is." Rose is reported to have not externally expressed his sexuality following his conversion. Rose's sexuality was a topic of controversy among some Eastern Orthodox faithful after it was publicized in Cathy Scott's 2000 biography Seraphim Rose.

== Eastern Orthodoxy ==
In 1962, Rose was received into the Russian Orthodox Church Outside Russia (ROCOR) in San Francisco. He quickly distinguished himself to the bishop of San Francisco, John Maximovitch, as a serious and studious convert. In 1963, Archbishop John blessed Rose and his new friend, Gleb Podmoshensky, a Russian Orthodox seminarian, to form a community of Eastern Orthodox booksellers and publishers, the St. Herman of Alaska Brotherhood. In March 1964, Rose opened an Eastern Orthodox bookstore next to the Holy Virgin Cathedral on Geary Boulevard in San Francisco, which was under construction at the time. In 1965, the brotherhood founded the St. Herman Press publishing house, which still exists.

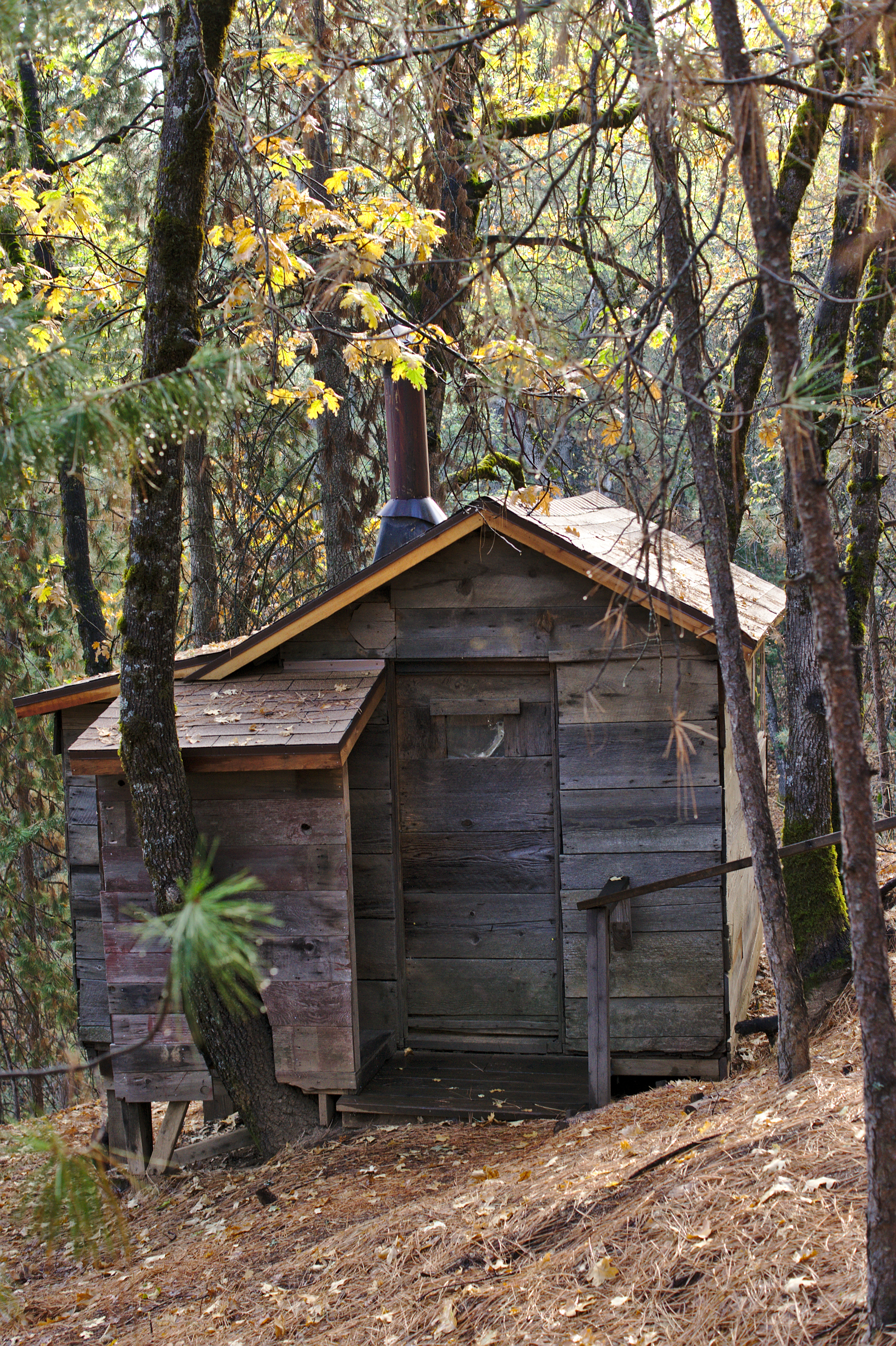
Rose's cell at the Saint Herman of Alaska monastery

Increasingly drawn to a more reclusive lifestyle, Rose's community ultimately decided to leave the city for the northern California wilderness, where Rose and Podmoshensky became monks in 1968 and transformed the Saint Herman of Alaska Brotherhood into a fully-fledged monastic community. Rose's parents provided the down payment for a mountaintop near the isolated hamlet of Platina, where Rose and some friends built a monastery named for Herman of Alaska. At his tonsure, in October 1970, Rose was given the name "Seraphim" after Seraphim of Sarov. He wrote, translated and studied for the priesthood in his cell, a one-roomed cabin with neither running water nor electricity, where he would spend the rest of his days. He was ordained a priest in ROCOR in 1977 by Bishop Nektary of Seattle, spiritual son of Nectarius of Optina, the last of the great Optina startsy.

In his ministry, Rose spoke frequently of an "Orthodoxy of the Heart", which he saw as increasingly absent in American ecclesiastical life. He also spoke of the need for warmth and kindness of the spirit, especially when dealing with those with whom one disagreed, an increasing problem in Eastern Orthodoxy in America, and its conflict between so-called "traditionalists" and "modernists". One can be firm, Rose insisted, without having to compromise basic Christian teachings on lovingkindness, longsuffering, and mercy toward others.

== Works ==
=== The Orthodox Word ===
Using a hand-cranked printing press at his Geary Boulevard bookstore, Rose founded the bimonthly magazine The Orthodox Word in January 1965; this periodical is still published on modern presses today.

=== Authorship ===
Rose authored many books. In his own lifetime, he published Orthodoxy and the Religion of the Future and The Soul After Death. During his lifetime, Rose conceived of a comprehensive work titled The Kingdom of Man and the Kingdom of God, which would be an analysis of what he saw as the falsehoods of modernity in contrast to the truth of the Orthodox faith. Rose shelved the project, and only one chapter of the work would be published posthumously in 1994 under the title of Nihilism: The Roots of the Revolution of the Modern Age.

Other posthumous publications of Rose's works have been produced, including Genesis, Creation and Early Man, a collection of Rose's commentaries, letters, notes, and lectures defending creationist views, which was first published in 2000. A 1978 essay he wrote for The Orthodox Word defending Saint Augustine from some Orthodox critics was published independently by the St. Herman of Alaska Brotherhood as The Place of Blessed Augustine in the Orthodox Church.

=== Lectures ===
Rose also lectured about the Orthodox religion. One of these lectures, given at the University of California, Santa Cruz in 1981, was published as God's Revelation to the Human Heart. In the summer of 1975, he gave a lecture series styled as an "Orthodox Survival Course".

=== Work as a translator ===
Rose was also a prolific translator. He was the first to translate and print Michael Pomazansky's Orthodox Dogmatic Theology into English. He was also one of the first American Eastern Orthodox Christians to translate major works of several Church Fathers into English. As such, he produced the first English translation of selected letters of Barsanuphius of Gaza and John the Prophet which were to be read out aloud at meals to his young monastic disciples and were later published by the St. Herman of Alaska Brotherhood.

Rose translated his own books into Russian, and they were circulated widely as samizdat within the Soviet Union, although they were not formally published until after the fall of the Communist regime.

== Philosophical views ==
=== Toll houses ===
Although most of Rose's works were widely received within the Orthodox community, a few raised controversy. The most notable of these was The Soul After Death, which describes certain "aerial toll houses" described by various Church Fathers and saints. According to this teaching, every human soul must pass a series of these stations after death as part of their initial judgment by God, where they will be accused of specific sins and possibly condemned to hell.

=== Creationism vs. evolution ===
The Orthodox Church has not dogmatized a specific scientific interpretation of the Book of Genesis, but many see the Church Fathers as articulating that living species were created instantaneously by God. The Oxford Handbook of Natural Theology states that Rose expressed a "kind of fundamentalism in relation to the patristic literature" regarding scientific questions. Rose engaged in the debate between Biblical creationism and evolution, asserting in Genesis, Creation and Early Man that Orthodox patristics exclusively supported the creationist viewpoint. This idea is not held universally by Eastern Orthodox theologians, and others criticize the idea by asserting that while mankind's existence is not accidental by any means, there is no official church doctrine as to the precise process God used in creation, nor the length of time that it might have required. In the 2011 edition of Rose's Genesis, Creation and Early Man, his spiritual child and editor, Hieromonk Damascene, alleges to have demonstrated that Rose's teaching is in accord with the great saints and elders of the 19th and 20th centuries who have spoken on the issue, such as Theophan the Recluse, John of Kronstadt, Justin Popovich, Paisios, and Sophrony.

== Death ==
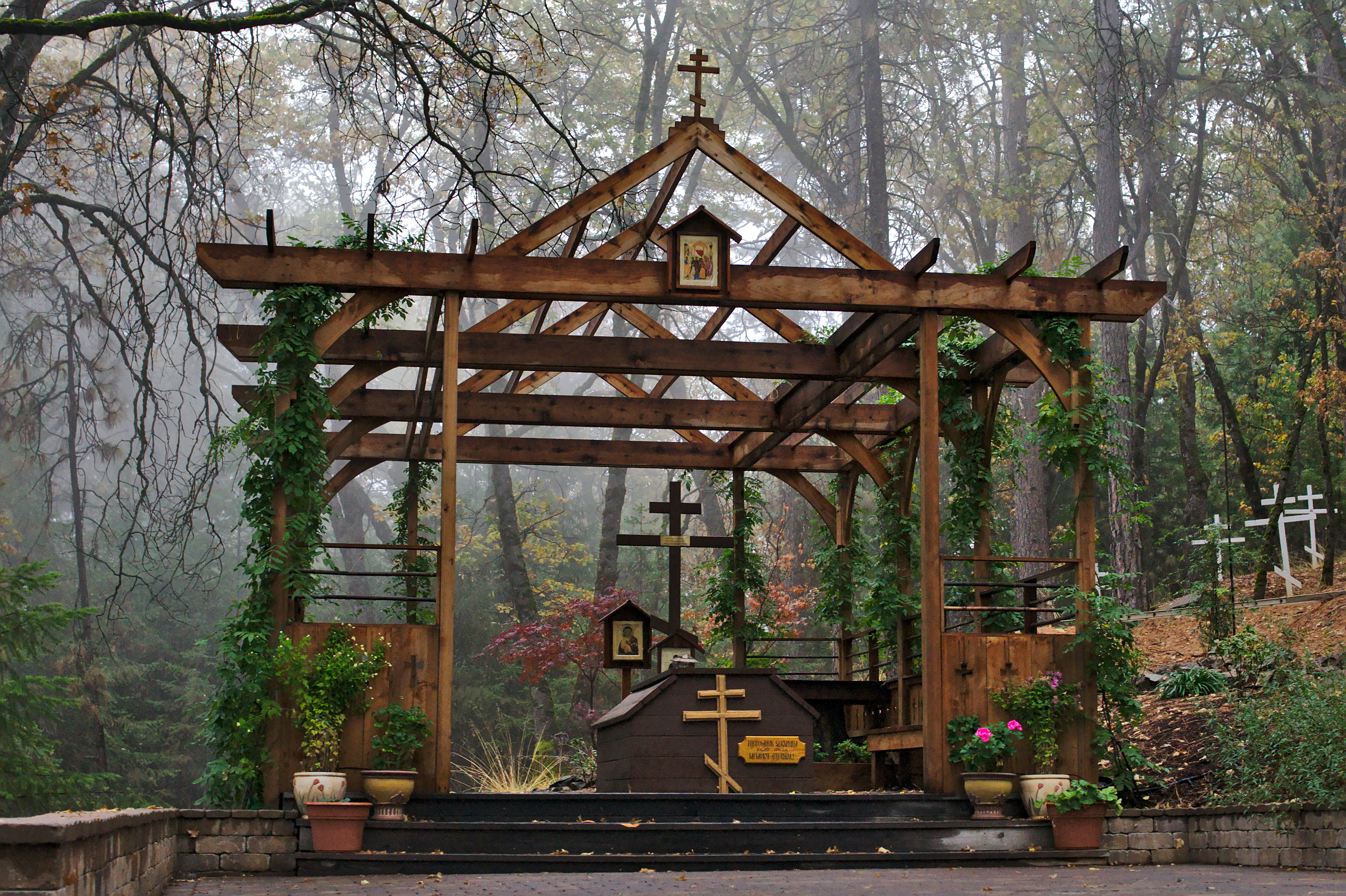
Grave of Rose at the Saint Herman of Alaska monastery (2015)

After feeling acute pains for several days while working in his cell in August 1982, a reluctant Rose was taken by fellow monks to Mercy Medical Center in Redding for treatment. When he arrived at the hospital, he was declared to be in critical condition and fell into semi-consciousness. After exploratory surgery was completed, it was discovered that a blood clot had blocked an artery supplying blood to his intestines, which had become a mass of dead tissue. He slipped into a coma after a second surgery, never regaining consciousness. Hundreds of people visited the hospital and celebrated the Divine Liturgy regularly in its chapel, praying for a miracle to save Rose's life. Prayers were offered for the ailing hieromonk from places as far away as Mount Athos, Greece, the spiritual heart of Orthodox monasticism. Rose died on September 2, 1982. Rose is buried at the Saint Herman of Alaska monastery, on the spot of his last public talk.

== Legacy ==
After Rose's death, the magazine Orthodox America published a full issue in memorial to him. Academic Robert C. Saler states that by the time of his death, Rose had "achieved a small but devoted following of young adults especially", and that posthumously his fame "has increased dramatically in [the] online age". Saler also notes that the Death to the World zine was heavily inspired by Rose's life and works. In a 2018 analysis of Rose in relation to other figures, Academic Christopher Howell called Rose one "of the dominant figures of contemporary American Orthodoxy" and "representative of a more zealous and ascetic strand of Orthodox converts" who stand against ecumenism and Darwinian evolution. Historian Matthew Namee placed him among the most influential figures on American Orthodoxy.

=== Veneration ===
Seraphim Rose
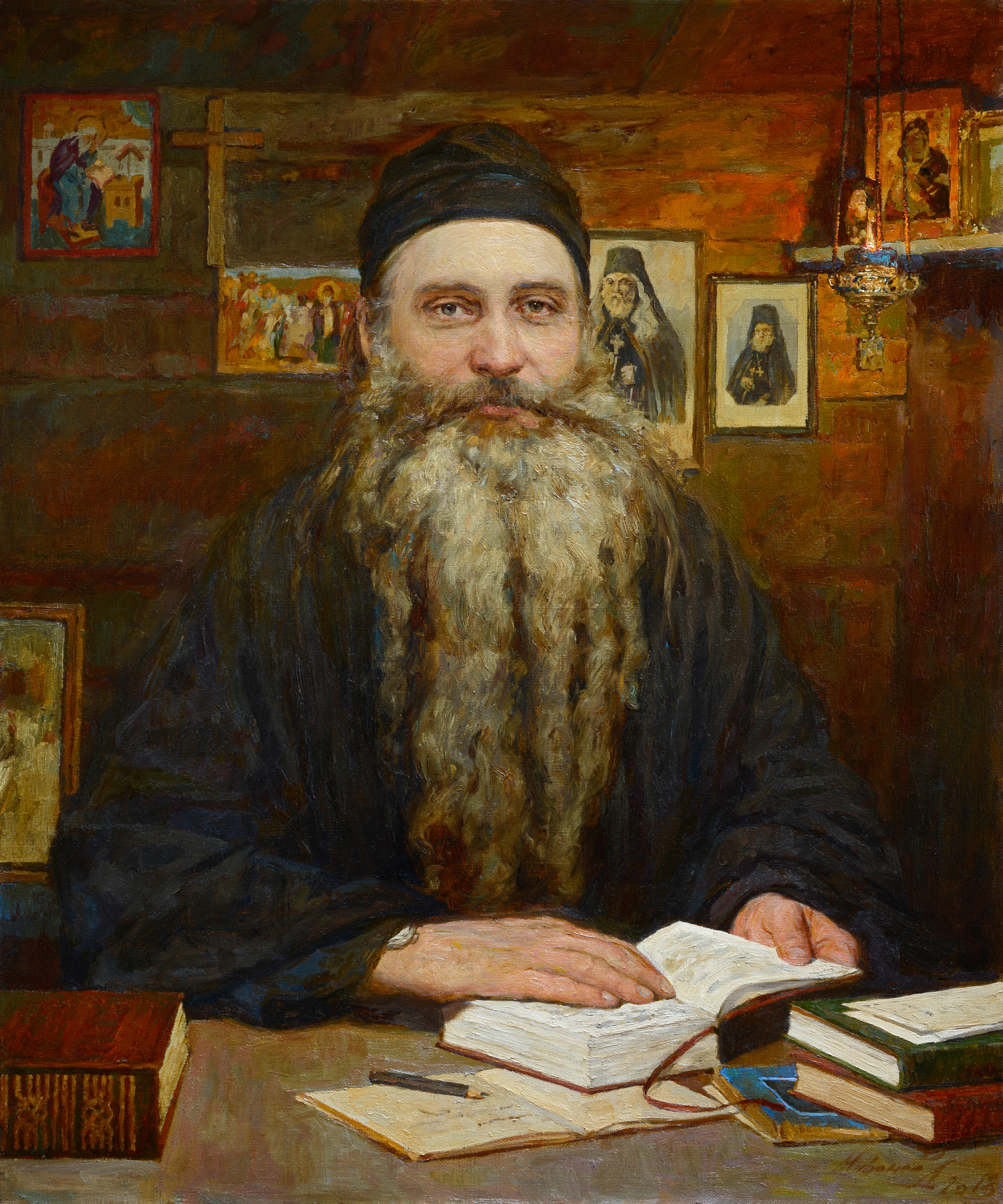
- Portrait painting of Rose by Andrei Mironov

Hieromonk
- Honored in: Eastern Orthodoxy (locally venerated saint)
- Canonized: February 2023 by Eparchy of Akhalkalaki, Kumurdo and Kars
- Major shrine: Saint Herman of Alaska Monastery, Platina, California

Some Orthodox Christians anticipate Rose's canonization by a synod. At the 40th anniversary of Rose's death, Metropolitan Nikoloz Pachuashvili of Akhalkalaki, from the Orthodox Church of Georgia, called for the canonization of Rose. Before returning to Georgia, Metropolitan Nikoloz brought the question of canonization to Bishop Maxim Vasiljević of the Serbian Orthodox Church's Diocese of Western America. Metropolitan Nikoloz canonized Rose locally in his diocese, the Eparchy of Akhalkalaki, Kumurdo and Kars, in February 2023. On September 6, 2022, Metropolitan Neophytos Masouras of Morphou, of the Orthodox Church of Cyprus gave a sermon calling Rose a saint. In 2025, the Russian Orthodox Church Outside of Russia formed a commission headed by Bishop James of Sonora to investigate the life and veneration of Rose. On May 5, 2026, the Council of Bishops of the Russian Orthodox Church Outside of Russia announced in its epistle that it had blessed the process of preparing for Rose's canonization.

Some have reported posthumous visions of Rose. A nun named Zvezdana at Prohor Pčinjski Monastery in Serbia informed her abbess that she had repeatedly felt the presence of Rose, and that he appeared to her on one occasion. She continued to pray, telling Rose that it was beautiful in his monastery. He replied, saying "It's beautiful here Prohor Pčinjski Monastery also—beautified by the relics of Fr. Prohor".

== St. Herman's Monastery today ==
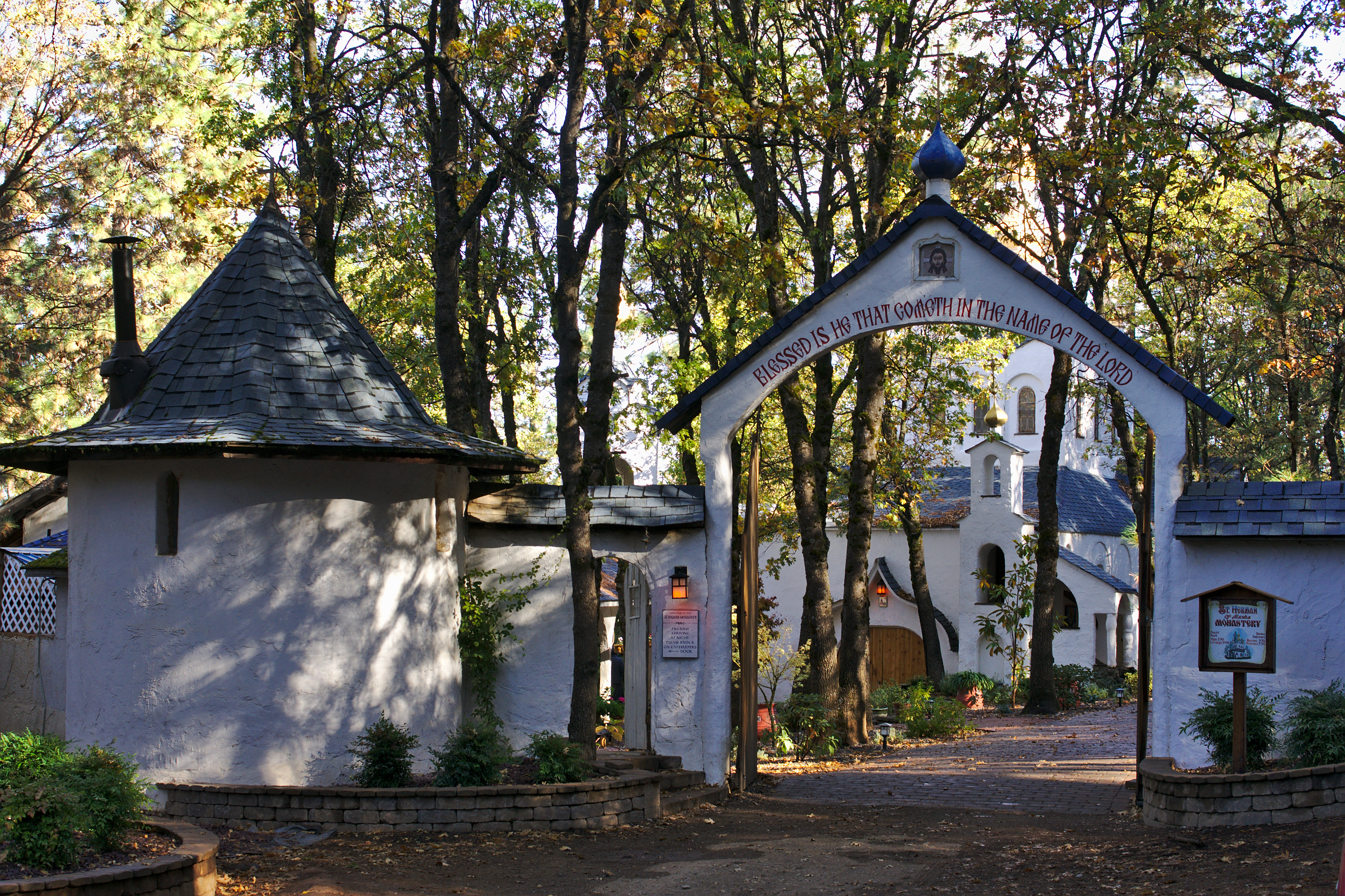
Saint Herman of Alaska Monastery, 2015

The St. Herman of Alaska Monastery in Platina is now a part of the Western America diocese of the Serbian Orthodox Church. While all of the brothers are currently American, many speak Russian. Their primary emphasis continues to be the printing of books, which has been the major activity of the brotherhood since its inception. In addition, the monastery has assisted with the guardianship and education of local youths with behavioral or learning problems. Visitors come to the monastery year-round but especially on September 2, the anniversary of Rose's death.

== Bibliography ==
- Orthodoxy and the Religion of the Future. Platina: Saint Herman of Alaska Brotherhood, 1975. (ISBN 188790400X)
- The Soul After Death: Contemporary "After-Death" Experiences in the Light of the Orthodox Teaching on the Afterlife. Platina: St. Herman of Alaska Brotherhood, 1980. (ISBN 093863514X)

=== Posthumous publications ===
- Blessed John the Wonderworker: A Preliminary Account of the Life and Miracles of Archbishop John Maximovitch. Platina: St. Herman of Alaska Brotherhood, 1987. (ISBN 0938635018)
- Genesis, Creation and Early Man. Platina: St. Herman of Alaska Brotherhood, 2000. (ISBN 1887904026)
- God's Revelation to the Human Heart. Platina: Saint Herman Press, 1987. (ISBN 0938635034)
- Letters from Father Seraphim. Nikodemos Orthodox Publication Society, 2001. (ISBN 1879066084)
- Nihilism: The Root of the Revolution of the Modern Age. Platina: St. Herman of Alaska Brotherhood, 1994. (ISBN 1887904069) (as Eugene Rose).
- The Apocalypse: In the Teachings of Ancient Christianity. Platina: Saint Herman of Alaska Brotherhood, 1985. (ISBN 0938635670)
- The Place of Blessed Augustine in the Orthodox Church. Platina: Saint Herman of Alaska Brotherhood, 1983. (ISBN 0938635123)
- Orthodox Survival Course. Samizdat Press, 2019. (ISBN 9780359754731)

== Biographical resources ==
- Father Seraphim: His Life and Works (ISBN 1-887904-07-7). Revised and expanded version of Not of This World.
- Letters from Father Seraphim (ISBN 1-879066-08-4). Correspondence with Fr. Alexey Young (now Hieromonk Ambrose), Rose's spiritual son.
- Not of This World: the Life and Teaching of Fr Seraphim Rose (ISBN 0-938635-52-2). A biography by monk Damascene Christensen.
- Seraphim Rose: The True Story and Private Letters (ISBN 1-928653-01-4). A biography of Rose's life, letters and works by Cathy Scott, Rose's niece.
