= Orthodoxy and the Religion of the Future =

1975 book by Seraphim Rose

- 1989 edition
- Author: Seraphim Rose
- Language: English
- Subject: Eastern Orthodoxy, comparative religion, cults, New Age movement
- Publisher: St. Herman of Alaska Brotherhood
- Publication date: 1975
- Publication place: United States
- Media type: Print (Paperback)
- Pages: 256
- ISBN: 9781887904001
- OCLC: 37750831
- Preceded by: Nihilism: The Roots of the Revolution of the Modern Age
- Followed by: The Soul After Death

Orthodoxy and the Religion of the Future is a book written by Seraphim Rose (born Eugene Dennis Rose), an American Eastern Orthodox author and ordained hieromonk. First published in 1975 and updated on December 31, 1979, the book examines how non-Christian religions and spiritual movements are leading people away from God in the modern era.

The book has been widely read in Russia and is available in Russian translation, with some accounts such as hieromonk Symeon (Tomachinsky) and archpriest Vladimir Vigilyansky describing how it made a strong impression in their religious lives. An epilogue added in the 1979 edition discusses the change of new spiritual movements, in line with themes that Seraphim Rose intended to explore.

A later edition was released on May 28, 1989, by Saint Herman Press, which is part of the Saint Herman of Alaska Brotherhood (also publisher of The Orthodox Word).

The book is managed and copyrighted by the Saint Herman of Alaska Brotherhood in Platina, California.

== History ==
Before publishing Orthodoxy and the Religion of the Future, Seraphim Rose had released other works, including God's Revelation to the Human Heart and Nihilism: The Roots of the Revolution of the Modern Age.

Works on Orthodoxy and the Religion of the Future began in 1971. At the time, there was a growing interest in interfaith dialogue and ecumenical approaches that engaged with non-Christian religions. Rose responded to this trend by writing four chapters addressing themes, which were originally published in The Orthodox Word in 1971 and 1972. These writings reflected his concerns about developments in the 1960s and early 1970s, particularly his perception of "Ecumenist heresy" based on personal experience.

Later chapters of the book addressed the charismatic revival, a movement that had gained influence among some Catholic and Orthodox priests in America. Rose referred to this trend as part of an emerging "ecumenical spirituality", which included religious experiences outside traditional Christian boundaries. The final chapter, which examined this movement, gained attention among American Orthodox readers and influenced some within the Church.

The first edition of Orthodoxy and the Religion of the Future was published in 1975, with a second, updated edition released on December 31, 1979. A later edition, featuring a slightly altered red-tinted cover, was published on May 28, 1989, by Saint Herman Press, operated by the Saint Herman of Alaska Brotherhood (also publisher of The Orthodox Word) currently holds the book's copyright.

== Content ==
The book contains eight chapters discussing the future of Eastern Orthodoxy and offering critiques of various modern spiritual movements from an Orthodox Christian perspective. Seraphim Rose addresses subjects such as like Eastern religions, the New Age movement, the charismatic revival, UFO phenomena, the Jonestown tragedy, and ecumenism. He interprets these movements as elements of a broader "religion of the future", i.e. the religion of the Antichrist. In Rose's view, these movements are made under the influence of demons in order to coerce the masses to either disregard or oppose Eastern Orthodox doctrine.

Rose argues that contemporary spiritual practices, including yoga, Zen Buddhism, Transcendental Meditation, and Pentecostalism, reflect a shift toward a united but deceptive global spirituality. According to him, this emerging spirituality may pave the way for a future world religion incompatible with Orthodox Christianity. He maintains that the Orthodox Christian tradition offers the necessary framework for understanding and resisting these modern spiritual trends.

The book is structured around patristic Eastern Orthodox teachings and takes a firm stance against non-Orthodox religious practices. While it has been considered controversial by some, it remains popular among some of the conservative ideologies of the Orthodox Christian community.

== Reception and influence ==
The book has had a mixed reception. Among traditional Eastern Orthodox Christians, particularly within the Russian Orthodox Church Outside of Russia (ROCOR) and some convert communities in the United States and Russia, it is viewed as an important but cautionary work. OrthoChristian.com reports that the book remains popular in Russian Orthodox circles and continues to influence discussions around spiritual discernment in contemporary culture. Orthodox Christian writer Paul Kingsnorth praised the book, seeing it as prescient to religious belief and technology in the 21st century. He stated "it's hard not to read it and shiver" considering his belief that social media has popularized occultism in the decades after the book's publication.

Critics argue that Rose's tone is polemical and that the book lacks engagement with contemporary scholarship on world religions. In a Medium article by Jakub Jurga, the author suggests that the book may reflect cultural anxieties more than objective theological analysis, though he acknowledges its value as a document of Eastern Orthodox Christian apologetics. Reviewer Sergei Chapnin criticized changes made to the text's views on ecclesiology between different editions.

The work has also been cited in discussions on the challenges of religious pluralism and the boundaries of Orthodox identity in the 21st century.

== See also ==
- Christianity in the United States
- Eastern Orthodoxy in North America
