= Holy Virgin Cathedral =

Russian Orthodox cathedral in San Francisco

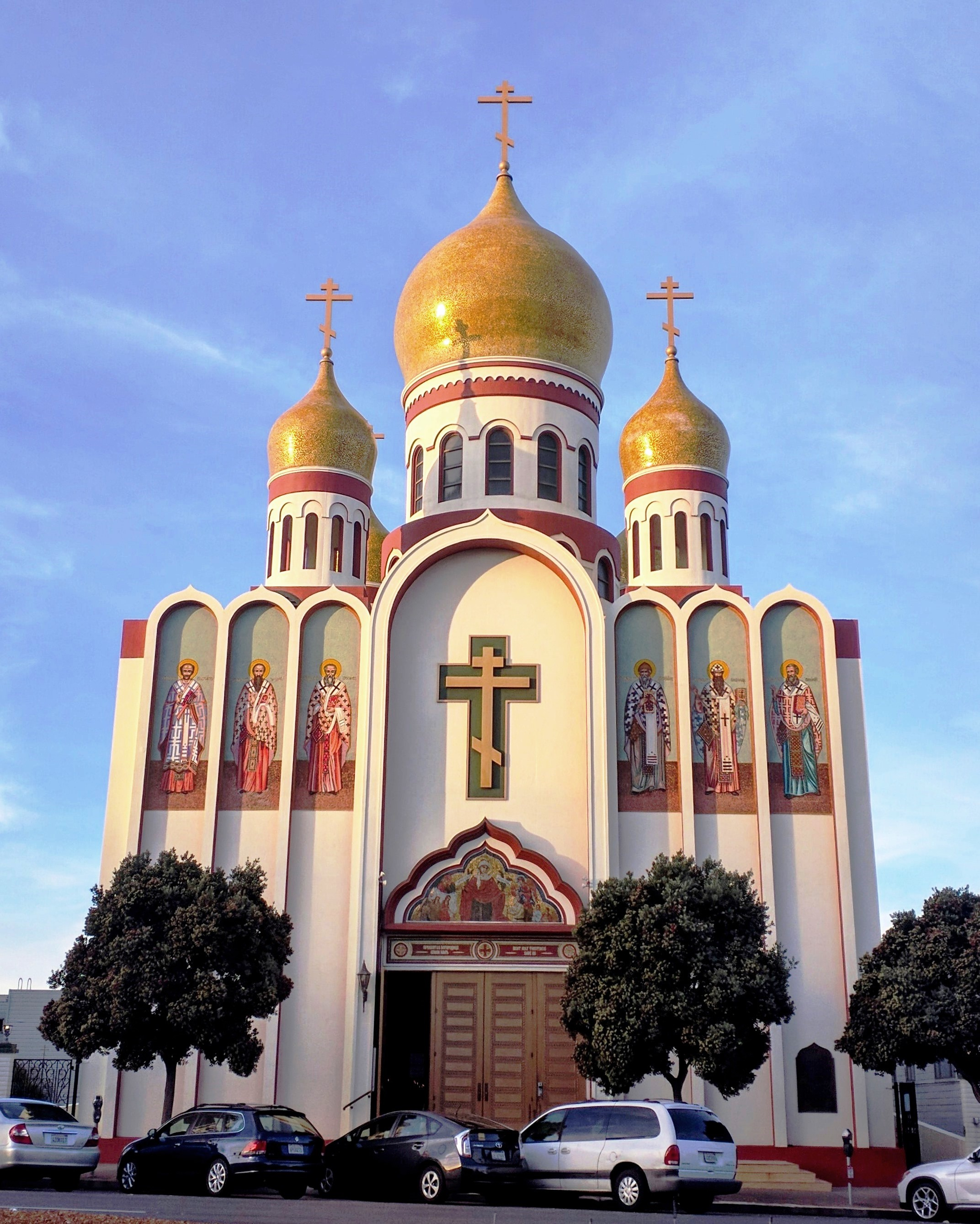
- as seen from Geary Boulevard (2018)

- Location of Holy Virgin Cathedral in San Francisco

Religion
- Affiliation: Russian Orthodox Church Outside Russia
- District: Richmond
- Region: United States
- Ecclesiastical or organisational status: Cathedral
- Status: Active

Location
- Location: 6210 Geary Blvd; San Francisco
- State: California
- Coordinates: 37°46′49.53″N 122°29′10.45″W

Architecture
- Architect: Oleg N. Ivanitsky
- Founder: John of Shanghai and San Francisco
- Groundbreaking: 1961
- Completed: 1965
- Direction of façade: South

The Holy Virgin Cathedral, also known as Joy of All Who Sorrow (Russian: Радосте-Скорбященский собор), is a Russian Orthodox cathedral in the Richmond District of San Francisco. It is the largest of the six cathedrals of the Russian Orthodox Church Outside Russia, which has over 400 parishes worldwide, and the cathedra of the Diocese of San Francisco and Western America.

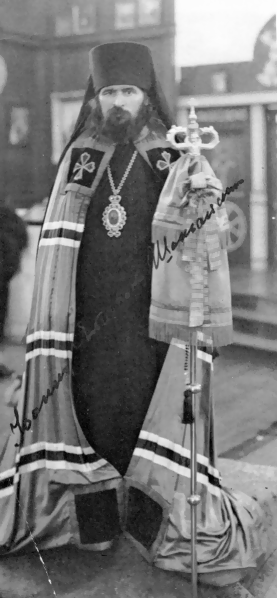
St. John of Shanghai and San Francisco founded the Holy Virgin Cathedral in 1961

== History ==
Russian settlement in California began at Fort Ross in 1812. The original San Francisco parish of the Russian Orthodox Church outside Russia was founded on June 2, 1927. An earlier Holy Virgin Cathedral was located at 858-64 Fulton Street between Fillmore and Webster Streets. That building is still extant and was designated a San Francisco Landmark on May 3, 1970.

The current cathedral at 6219 Geary Boulevard in the Richmond District was founded by St. John of Shanghai and San Francisco, born Mikhail Maximovitch. The neighborhood is known for its Russian restaurants and shops, and the "most visible Russian presence is the magnificent Holy Virgin Cathedral".

Groundbreaking took place on June 25, 1961, construction was completed in 1965, and the cathedral was consecrated on January 31, 1977. St. John, who died in 1966, is buried within the cathedral.

== Architecture ==
The cathedral was designed by Oleg N. Ivanitsky, and features five onion domes covered in 24 carat gold leaf. The "incredible beauty" of the interior, which is "lined by icons, religious paintings, and mosaics, and lit by a voluminous chandelier" can be seen only by those who attend religious services and go on visitation days.

The mosaic work on the outside of the building were done by Alfonso Pardiñas of Byzantine Mosaics.

== Clergy and programs ==
The rector of the cathedral is Kyrill (Dmitrieff), Archbishop of San Francisco and Western America. The archbishop is a San Francisco native and a graduate of the University of San Francisco. The cathedral operates a K–12 school, the Saint John of San Francisco Orthodox Academy, as well as a bookstore and housing for senior citizens.
