= Gap Analysis Project =

American wildlife conservation program

The Gap Analysis Project (GAP, previously called Gap Analysis Program) is a nationwide program in the United States which uses gap analysis to assess and support the overall conservation status of wildlife. The program is directed and coordinated under the United States Geological Survey, but is implemented in coordination with state and regional programs.

GAP works to ensure that common species – those that are not officially endangered – remain common by identifying those species and plant communities that are not adequately represented in existing conservation lands.

The GAP program began in the 1980s, based on analysis of Hawaiian bird species by J. Michael Scott.

GAP has produced national land cover and protected areas datasets, which it uses to assess the conservation status of mammal, bird, reptile, and amphibian species in the U.S.

A GAP program normally has three principal components: 1. Landcover analysis 2. Vertebrate species distribution prediction 3. Land stewardship database

Each component is normally performed as a GIS layer.
