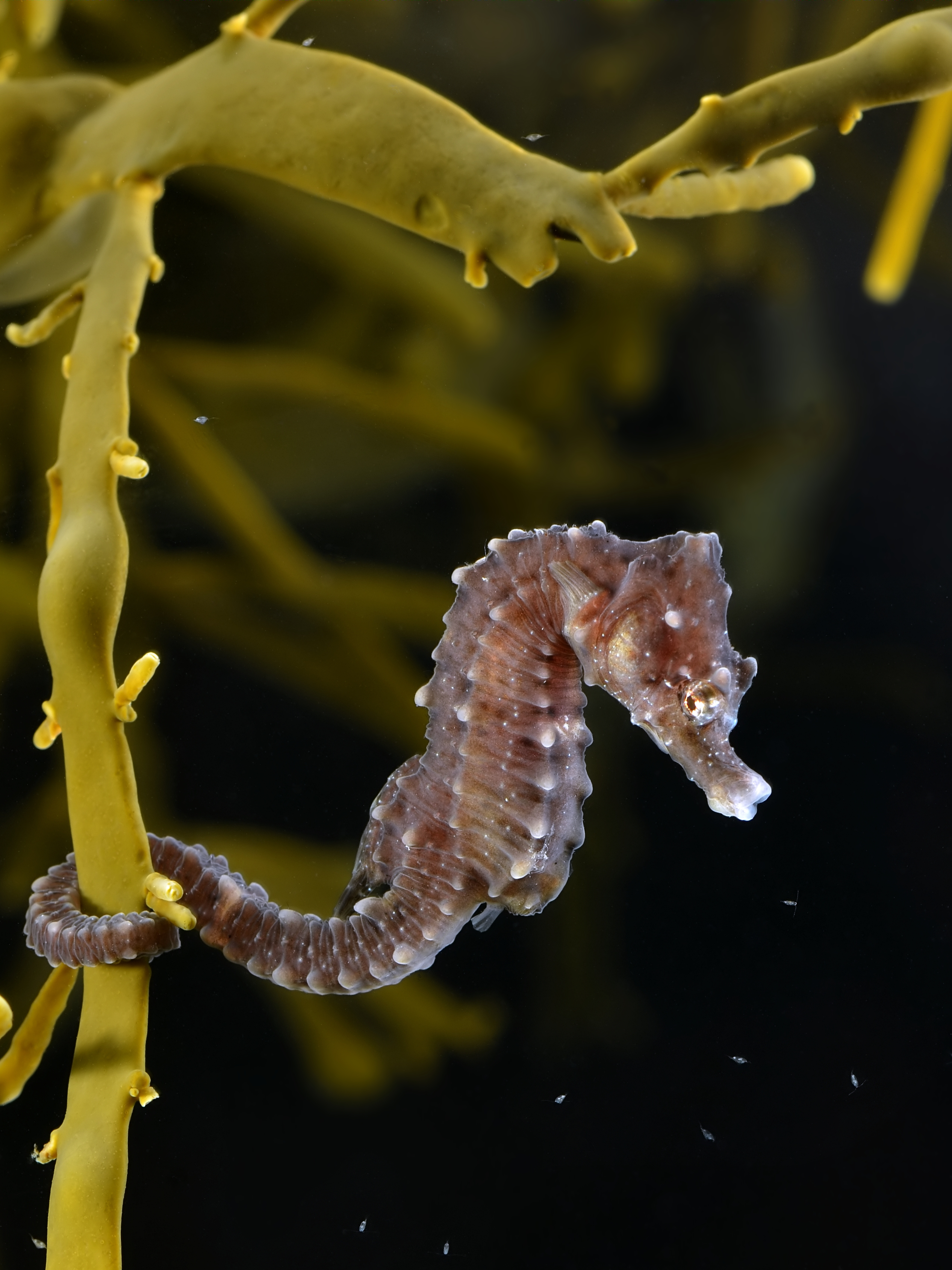

Conservation status
- Least Concern (IUCN 3.1)
- CITES Appendix II

Scientific classification
- Kingdom: Animalia
- Phylum: Chordata
- Class: Actinopterygii
- Division: Teleostei
- Order: Syngnathiformes
- Family: Syngnathidae
- Genus: Hippocampus
- Species: H. hippocampus

Binomial name
- Hippocampus hippocampus (Linnaeus, 1758)

Synonyms
- Syngnathus hippocampus Linnaeus, 1758; Hippocampus antiquorum Leach, in Leach & Nodder, 1814; Hippocampus antiquus Risso, 1827; Hippocampus brevirostris Schinz, 1822; Hippocampus europaeus Ginsburg, 1933; Hippocampus heptagonus Rafinesque, 1810; Hippocampus pentagonus Ginsburg, 1937; Hippocampus vulgaris Cloquet, 1821

= Short-snouted seahorse =

Species of fish

The short-snouted seahorse (Hippocampus hippocampus) is a species of seahorse in the family Syngnathidae. It is endemic to the Mediterranean Sea and parts of the North Atlantic, particularly around Italy, Portugal, Spain, and the Canary Islands, with small populations extending from the Atlantic into the North Sea.

Their preferred habitat is shallow muddy waters, estuaries, or seagrass beds.

== Protection ==
In the United Kingdom, they are protected under the Wildlife and Countryside Act 1981, and two of the 27 Marine Conservation Zones designated in the seas off England were established to protect populations and habitats of short-snouted seahorses. In 2010, the London Zoo, which operates a short-snouted seahorse breeding programme, saw the birth of 918 baby seahorses. Regionally, the short-snouted seahorse is classified as Near Threatened in the Mediterranean and Data Deficient in Croatia. In Europe, this species is normally caught as bycatch and such catches may be sold as curios. Some live animals are collected under licence in Spain and Portugal for Aquaria. In West Africa, it is more common as bycatch than in Europe.

This species is listed on CITES Appendix II, as are all seahorses but the amount traded is masked by misidentification and in at least one shipment H. hippocampus was listed as another species. There are few trading records from the western Atlantic/Mediterranean region where this species is native and many records of exports from the Indo-Pacific area which are either misidentifications or re-exports of specimens which were exported from the native range without the appropriate export certificates being issued.

Other listings for this species include the Barcelona Convention Annex II, OSPAR Convention: Annex V and the Convention on the Bern Convention: Appendix II.

== Habitat and distribution ==
Hippocampus hippocampus are typically found on the bottoms of rocks, in seaweed or in the edge of sea grass beds in shallow muddy water. They can only be found in waters that are up to 77 metres (253 ft) deep. They have a very restricted home range because they have very limited daily movements. The most of their movement occurs when storms occur and the seahorses are moved with the current or they are carried away because of their grasp on debris that is floating in the water. In the winters they typically move into the deeper water to escape rough seas. They will use their tails to anchor themselves to stems of plants and are able to camouflage very well.

The short-snouted seahorse is found in the northeastern Atlantic, from northwestern Scotland and the Netherlands south to Senegal and into the Mediterranean Sea as well as in the coastal waters of the Azores, Madeira, and the Canary Islands. In Britain and Ireland, the distribution is influenced by the warmer waters of the Gulf Stream which create the conditions for higher productivity of plankton and this means that both this species and the long-snouted seahorse are found mainly on southern and western coasts but as the Gulf Stream flows into the North Sea to the north and south of the Great Britain small populations of both species do exist in the North Sea. In 2007, colonies of the species were discovered in the River Thames around London and Southend-on-Sea.

The distribution in Italy of H. hippocampus has been recently analysed and updated . H. hippocampus was found on the entire Italian coast, primarily in the Sicily, Sardinia, Ionian, and Tyrrhenian seas. From the northern coast of Abruzzo to Emilia Romagna, a gap in the habitat appropriateness of H. hippocampus was discovered. The regions with the highest values of H. hippocampus-suitable areas (> 1,500 km^{2}) were Sicily, Sardinia, Apulia, Calabria, Tuscany, and Campania, whereas the regions with the lowest values (< 100 km^{2}) were Molise, Emilia-Romagna, and Marche.

== Description ==
Hippocampus hippocampus has potential to be up to 15 centimetres (5.9 in) long. They have a prominent spine above each eye. They have snouts that are short and upturned. Their snouts are about 1/3 of the length of their head. Their dorsal fin has 16–18 rays with a dark stripe that runs parallel to the margin and provides propulsion. Their pectoral fins have 13–15 rays and are located below the gill openings. Their pectoral fins are mostly utilized for stability and steering. Their angular appearance comes from the bony tubercles that are in the body rings. Their bodies can be black, purple, orange or brown. They have a tail that is unable to bend backwards but is considered semi-flexible. They use it as an anchor by wrapping it around coral or sea grass. The tail is also used to get hold of a partner during greeting and mating services.

== Feeding ==
On average, the adult seahorse will eat roughly between 30 and 50 tiny shrimp a day. Hippocampus hippocampus are known to be ambush predators who feed on live, moving food. They will remain still until a small animal passes within reach and then grab it. They do not have teeth or a stomach, so they use their snout to suck their food straight into their gut. Since the seahorse has no stomach, food passes through its digestive system quickly.

== Reproduction ==
Short snouted seahorses are considered ovoviviparous meaning that the female deposits eggs into a pouch on the male's stomach, called a brood pouch, and the male goes through pregnancy and labour. Sexual maturation occurs during the first reproductive season after birth. The length of the reproductive season can vary based on temperature, light, and water turbulence. Sexual maturity in males is recognized by a brood pouch.

Males have two common yet very aggressive courtship behaviours. The first is snapping, a male will aim and flick his snout at his opposing male in order to propel him away. If the male is successful, the opposing seahorse will darken and flatten into a submissive position signalling that he has given up. The second behaviour is wrestling. This occurs when one male refuses to release the opposing male from his hold. Both males will fall with their interlocked tail, but the submissive male will darken and flatten in a submissive position until it is released.

Male and female pairs of short snouted seahorses are very faithful to each other. This is showcased by their reproductive states and their greetings to one another. Male and females who are in faithful pairs will have synchronised reproductive state changes to confirm that they are faithful to each other. They also greet one another daily which lasts from six to eight minutes. When the male is ready for reproduction, he will pump water in and out of his pouch. Females point their head towards the water surface to show that they are ready for reproduction. The female will line up the base of her trunk to the opening pouch of the male and insert her ovipositor into the male's pouch. The eggs are then deposited and fertilised in the brood pouch. The transfer of eggs from females to males only takes about 6–10 seconds. The male's pouch will close up after the eggs are fertilised.

The pear-shaped eggs are implanted into the wall of the pouch and surrounded by tissues. Oxygen is able to get through to the eggs through the capillaries. There is placental fluid present which provides the eggs with nutrients and oxygen and removes waste products. The egg yolk which comes from the mother is also full of necessary nutrients. The male secretes the enzyme prolactin which initiates the breakdown of the outer layer of the egg for placental fluid to be produced. Pregnancy only lasts 20–21 days and the male will usually go into labour in the night. The number of young produced can range from 50 to 100 and greatly depends on the age of the male. The older males will produce a larger number of offspring. If the male is in a pair that he is familiar with, he can mate again within a few hours of giving birth with no negative effects.
