= Ocean Beach Antique District =

Shopping area in San Diego, California

Coordinates: 32°44′45″N 117°14′58″W

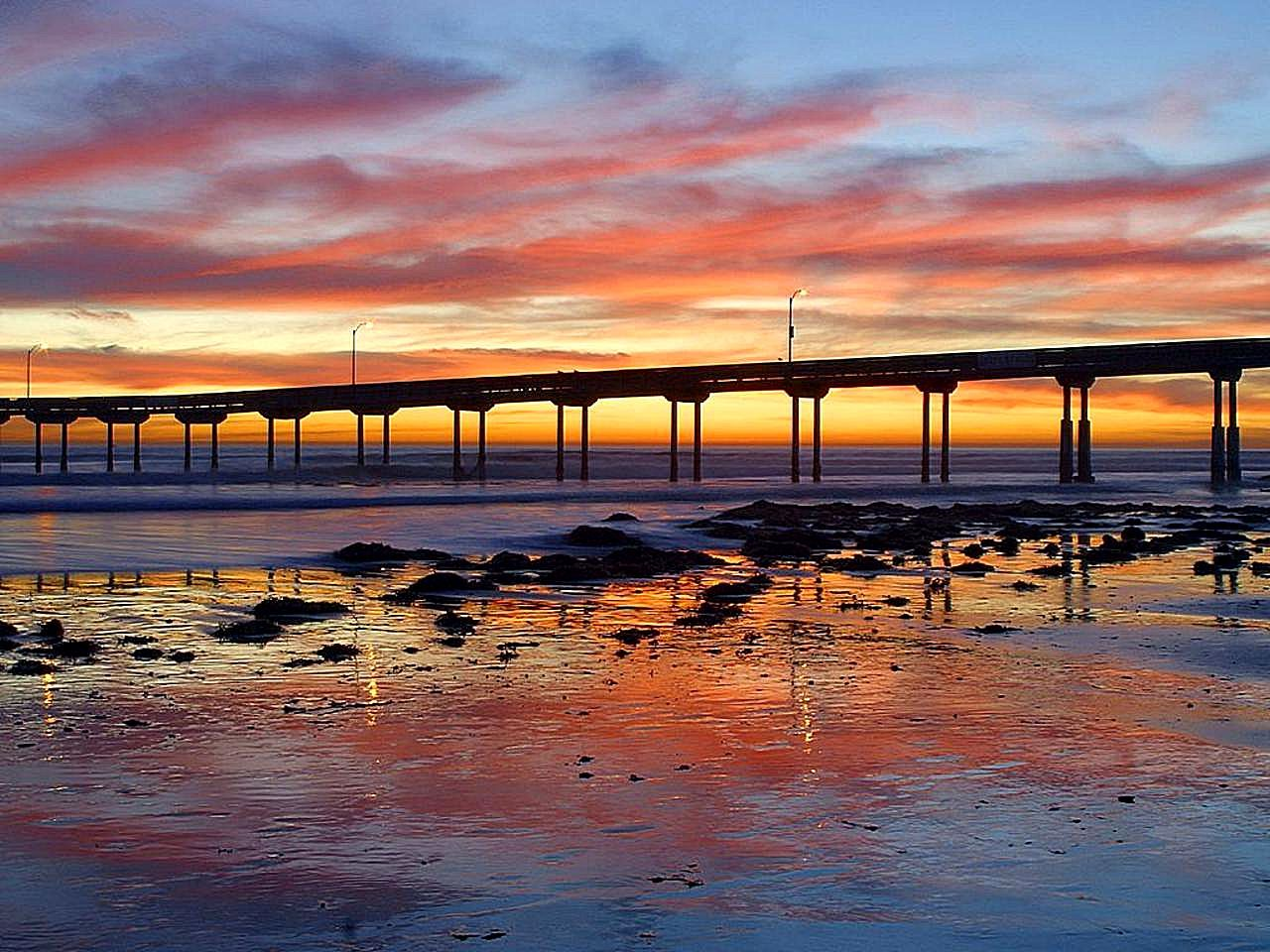
Sunset, with nearby Ocean Beach Fishing Pier, in Ocean Beach.

The Ocean Beach Antique District is a specialty shopping district in the Ocean Beach neighborhood of San Diego, California. It is a few miles northwest of downtown San Diego.

== Description ==
Located on the community's main street, Newport Avenue, it is a two-block stretch noted for a large concentration of antique and collectible shops, consignment stores, and multi-dealer malls. There are a dozen shops and malls housing more than 200 individual dealers - the largest concentration of antique dealers in San Diego County.

The shops are within walking distance of the beach and Ocean Beach Fishing Pier at the foot of Newport Avenue. The Antique District hosts special events such as a Holiday Open House and an Oktoberfest sales event.

The district has been called a "beachside Antique Row" by San Diego Magazine. It is also listed as a "Favorite Resource" in Rachel Ashwell's book, Shabby Chic Treasure Hunting & Decorating Guide. In 2015 the District was listed as "best antique store" in a "Best of San Diego" readers poll by the San Diego Union Tribune.

== History ==
Ocean Beach became a destination for antiques starting in 1989, when the Cottage Antiques mall was opened by Cordelia Mendoza with husband Bob Mendoza. She became a leader of the local business community and has been honored as "a pioneer in establishing the antiques district in Ocean Beach."

The area was recognized by the city of San Diego as an official district in the late 1990s.

== See also ==
- List of shopping streets and districts by city
- Ocean Beach, San Diego topics
