= Averky Taushev =

Russian religious leader (1906–1976)

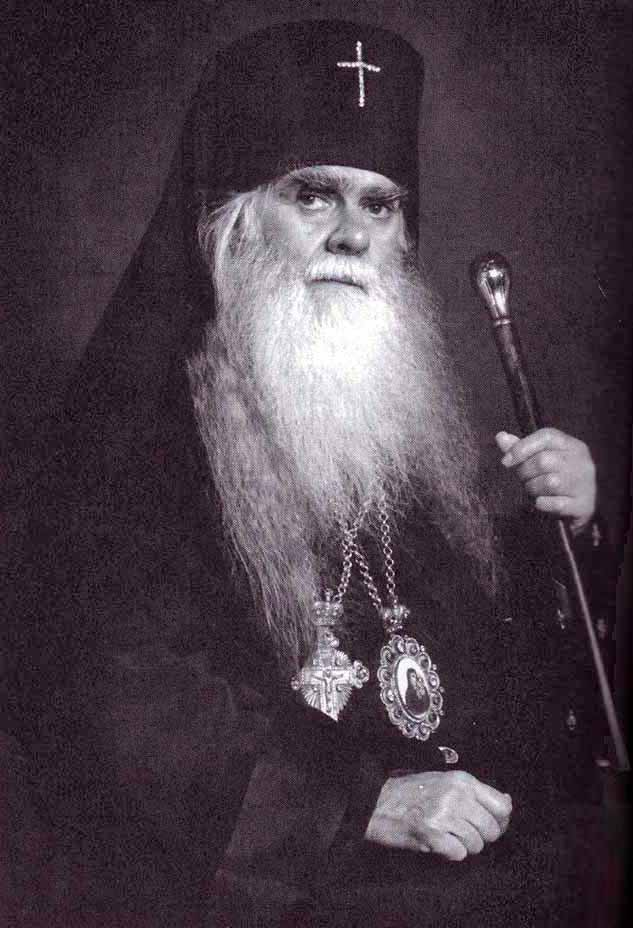
Image of Averkiy

Archbishop Averky (Russian: Архиепископ Аверкий; secular name Alexander Pavlovich Taushev, Russian: Александр Павлович Таушев, TA-oo-shef; 1 November [O.S. October 19] 1906 – 13 April 1976) was a bishop of the Russian Orthodox Church Outside of Russia, Archbishop of Syracuse and Holy Trinity, rector of Holy Trinity Monastery and rector of Holy Trinity Orthodox Seminary in Jordanville, New York. A notable Russian Orthodox theologian and spiritual writer of the 20th century, publicist.

== Biography ==
=== Childhood in Russia ===
Born on October 19, 1906 in Kazan, he was the only and beloved son of Pavel Sergeyevich and Maria Vladimirovna Taushev, a noblepeople from the Simbirsk Governorate. His father, a graduate of the Military Law Academy, served in the military judicial department before the 1917 revolution. Subsequently, Archbishop Averky recalled this period of his life as follows: "The nature of my father's service was the reason that we constantly had to travel around Russia. And I thank God that <...> I nevertheless saw it and deeply imprinted her in my childish heart. <…> These memories of our travels in Russia seem like a kind of dream to me, and they will never be erased from my memory until my death. It is unforgettable for me to visit the holy Kremlin, in the heart of Russia — the Mother See of Moscow, with its shrines, starting with the Assumption Cathedral, where our Sovereigns were crowned and the Primates of the Russian Church were enthroned. The Trinity-Sergius Lavra with the holy relics of the "mourner of the Russian Land", St. Sergius, Kiev Caves Lavra, Alexander Nevsky Lavra, Peter and Paul, St. Isaac's and Kazan Cathedrals and the Savior on Blood in St. Petersburg. I do not want to believe that now these are only "museum" values, that the church and national life that used to be there will not be revived".

He loved to read when he was a kid. After reading all the children's books in home library, including Pushkin, Gogol, Lermontov, he began to read books of spiritual content that his father had. "I was most interested in the items in my father's huge closet in his office. I liked to climb there when my father went to work, and I was especially fond of reading the large Bible in Russian with numerous illustrations by Gustave Doré, which made a great impression on me. Then I enthusiastically read the "Guide to the Holy Land" and the "Guide to Mount Athos". My parents were not particularly "churchpeople," but they were deeply religious people, and my father was very fond of and subscribed to books of spiritual content published by St. Panteleimon Monastery on Mount Athos. When I got to these books, they especially struck me not only with their content, but also with the special spiritual fragrance that emanated from them. Reading these books, I just reveled in this wonderful fragrance, and I was sorry to part with these books, having put them back in the closet on the shelf. That's how I gradually got acquainted with the book "Invisible Warfare," which made a deep impression on me, and then with the book "The spiritual life: and how to be attuned to it" by Bishop Theophan the Recluse and with collections of his Letters. I was constantly walking around under the impression of what I had read, and somehow I began to become more and more alienated from the ordinary social life around me. But in those early years, I did not feel a special attraction to the God's shrine, I did not know and did not understand our wonderful, incomparable worship even then. It came later, gradually. In my soul, even then, at the age of 7-8, I subconsciously had a desire to lead a monastic life, detached from ordinary secular life, <...> in which I saw nothing attractive".

In January 1920, the Taushev family left their homeland after many wanderings: "I remember with what sorrow my heart was squeezed when we left the Russian land… With bated breath, we watched the last Russian lights on the horizon disappear. Goodbye, our poor long-suffering Homeland! And is it really forever?".

=== Life in Bulgaria ===
At the end of January 1920, the steamer carrying the Taushev family stopped at the Bulgarian port of Varna. The city authorities accommodated the newly arrived refugees in dormitories. At first, they "enjoyed a quiet, peaceful life here, from which they managed to wean themselves in Russia during the terrible years of the revolution of the 1917-1920s. The Bulgarians welcomed us cordially and kindly". In the same year, a Russian gymnasium was launched in Varna, which enrolled 25 students, including Alexander Taushev. According to his memoirs, "I loved studying very much, and for me it was a real pleasure when we started studying some new subject. I especially loved history and geography, as well as the history of Russian literature. At one time he was fond of the Latin language". During his high school years, Alexander Taushev was strongly influenced by the church of St. Athanasius the Great, which was given to the Russian community, and its rector, Archpriest John Slunin. According to the memoirs of those who knew him in Bulgaria, at that time Taushev always looked solemn, sedated in his movements and conversation. He also was somewhat detached because he was a little deaf.

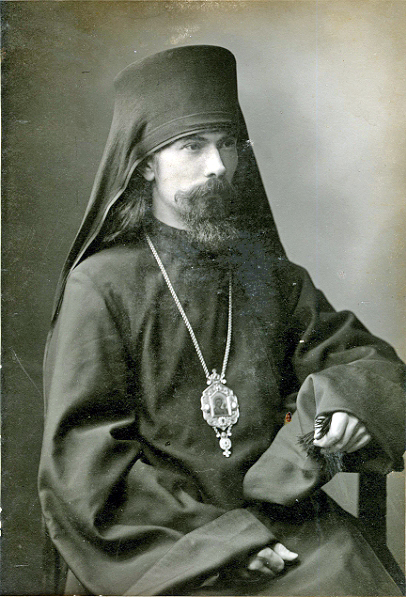
Bishop Theophan (Bystrov) in 1910s

In the summer of 1925, Archbishop Theophan (Bystrov) arrived in Varna, who had a great influence on the young Alexander Taushev: "I was deeply struck by his extraordinary appearance, unlike other bishops I had seen before, his prayerful ministry and wonderful sermon, which inspired me with the spirit of ancient patristic writings, which I was fond of reading. And suddenly I found out that he had been hired for the whole summer a summer cottage five kilometers from the city, where he would live every summer, coming from Sofia, where he settled in the building of the Bulgarian Holy Synod. A particularly exalted spiritual joy seized my heart in the hope that I would often be able to see this genuine saint of God, who struck me so much with his spirituality, and perhaps even converse with him. I immediately came up with the audacious idea of asking him to be my "elder" — a spiritual father in monasticism, which I resolutely decided to accept after seeing in Vladyka Theophan the ideal of a monk and a saint. <...> It is difficult for me to express in words what I felt on my first meeting with this great saint. He breathed upon me an extraordinary peace of mind and such a fragrance of genuine holiness, which I have never had to meet anywhere else, neither before nor after". After that, 19-year-old Alexander Taushev decided "firmly, without the slightest doubt or hesitation" to become a monk. Alexander Taushev often visited the cottage where Archbishop Theophan lived, got acquainted with his cell-attendants and became one of them. When Archbishop Theophan was outside of Bulgaria, Alexander Taushev corresponded with him.

In 1926 he graduated from the Russian gymnasium with a gold medal. After that, with the blessing of Archbishop Theophan, he entered the Faculty of Theology at Sofia University. On June 3, 1930, he successfully passed the exam with a total score of 5 points. After graduating with honors from Sofia University, Alexander Taushev had the opportunity to get a place in the Bulgarian Orthodox Church, but he decided "to serve as the leader of the Russian Church, to work in the spiritual field of our Russian people." He decides to go to serve in Carpathian Rus (now the Zakarpattia Oblast of Ukraine). "I regularly received the newspaper Orthodox Carpathian Rus, and so I had the intention to go to Subcarpathian Rus — then it was Czecho-Slovakia — where there was at that time a spontaneous return of the masses of the enslaved and oppressed for centuries of the Russian people, people torn from Mother Russia for centuries; [return] from the union with Papal Rome, forcibly imposed on them by the enemies to their native paternal Eastern Orthodox faith". Alexander sent the petition and received a response from Bishop Joseph (Cvijović) that he might be offered the position of assistant secretary of the Diocesan Administration in the city of Khust. He received a blessing for this from Archbishop Theophan (Bystrov), who also gave him money for travel, since his parents did not have the means to buy a train ticket. He left Bulgaria with mixed feelings: "On the one hand, the sorrow of separation from my Abba, (Archbishop Theophan) and with my parents, whom I loved very much, on the other hand, I am glad that one way or another, with the blessing of my Abba, I am approaching the realization of my cherished dream — to become a monk, and at the same time on the territory of the Ruthenian land, which even officially bore the name "Subcarpathian Rus" that attracted me. I was glad to think that I would devote myself to such a lofty cause, missionary service for the return of our deceived and oppressed brothers in faith and blood to their native fatherly faith."

=== Ministry in the Carpathian region ===
On April 23, 1931, Alexander Taushev arrived in Transcarpathia, and on May 1 of the same year he was enlisted in the service of a junior official of the diocesan administration. He remained in this position until June 1, 1932. On May 6, 1931, on the feast of the Great Martyr George, he was ordained a reader by Bishop Joseph in the church of the village of Čumalovo. On May 17, 1931, at the St Nicholas Monastery in the village of Iza, Khust district, he was tonsured into a mantle with the name Averky in honor of Equal-to-the-Apostles Abercius, Bishop of Hierapolis. The next day, he was ordained a hierodeacon, remaining in the service of the diocesan chancery and performing deaconal duties at the bishop. On April 7, 1932, on the feast of the Annunciation of the Most Holy Theotokos, he was ordained a hieromonk by Bishop Damascene (Grdanički) of Mukačevo and Prešov in a monastery in the village of Domboky.

On April 18, 1932, the secretary of the Diocesan Administration, Sergei Ryasnyansky, informed the rector of the Orthodox church in Užhorod, Archpriest Mikhail Meygesh, that the ruling bishop, "in view of the need to support and strengthen Orthodoxy in Užhorod," was sending Hieromonk Averky (Taushev) to his disposal. The duties of the young missionary included serving and preaching on the eve of the Easter holidays, helping in the confession of believers. On June 1, 1932, Hieromonk Averky was transferred to St. Nicholas Monastery to serve as an assistant rector and to serve parishes in the villages of Nankovo and Boroniava. On August 20, 1932, the secretary informed the Parish Committee that the bishop had decided to appoint Hieromonk Averky as assistant rector and asked for decent living conditions in the city. On September 9, 1932, at the request of believers in Užhorod, he was appointed assistant rector of the Intercession Church. On November 12, 1932, Hieromonk Averky sent Bishop Damascene a letter and the first issue of the Parish Bulletin, which he planned to publish in order to inform members of the Orthodox community. On the reverse side we find a positive resolution of the bishop. On July 2, 1933, the First Congress of Carpatho-Russian Youth was held in Užhorod. Six priests attended the meeting: Archimandrite Alexius (Kabalyuk), Archpriest Iriney Khanat, Hieromonks Sabbas (Struve), Innocent (Chopik), Philip (Gardner) and Averky (Taushev). After the festive liturgy, 40 people, mostly young people, applied to leave the union for Orthodox Church. On August 7, 1933, Hieromonk Averky was appointed acting rector, and on August 23, 1934, he was appointed permanent administrator of the Užhorod parish. On July 1, 1935, Hieromonk Averky was appointed rector of the parish in Užhorod with the right to receive a state fee (Congrua portio).

On August 7, 1935, he became the publisher-editor of the diocesan magazine Orthodox Carpatho-Russian Bulletin. On September 1, 1935, he was awarded the right to wear a Nabedrennik. By decree of December 4, Hieromonk Averky was appointed a full-time teacher of the Law of God at the state Realgymnasium, in Russian and Czech civil and public schools in Užhorod. By decree of December 12, 1936, he was appointed a member of the Supreme Ecclesiastical Court of the Orthodox Diocese of Mukačevo and Prešov. By decree of December 31, 1936, he was appointed head of the educational unit (inspector) and teacher of liturgy at the pastoral and theological courses at the Diocesan Administration. On May 2, 1937, on Easter Day, Hieromonk Averky was elevated to the rank of hegumen in the memorial church to Russian soldiers with the laying of a golden pectoral cross and a palitsa by Bishop Damascene (Grdanički). By decree of July 5, 1937, Hegumen Averky was appointed a member of the examination committee for the position of parish priest and at the same time a member of the examination committee for the title of "Professor of the gymnasium on the subject of the Law of God". On January 22, 1937, Averky and Chairman of the Church Council Ilarion Curkanovič informed the Diocesan Administration of the need to erect a church house ("fara") and a hotel attached to it. The document notes that due to the lack of premises, the parish has been left without its own spiritual and cultural center for meetings, readings, lectures, talks, and singing. Hieromonk Averky suggested contacting the Ministry of Schools and Public Education through the leadership of the diocese, as well as the clergy throughout Subcarpathian Rus.

On November 18, 1938, he was transferred to the episcopal residence in Mukačevo with appointment to the post of rector of the parish. After the Vienna Arbitration, part of Transcarpathia was ceded to Kingdom of Hungary, and therefore the diocese Mukačevo and Prešov was divided by state borders. By decree of December 24, 1938, Hegumen Averky was appointed administrator of part the diocese of Mukačevo and Prešov, which was located on the territory of the Kingdom of Hungary, with the right to directly represent the interests of the Orthodox Church in Hungary before the state authorities in Budapest. In connection with the move of the diocesan bishop to the Czech territory, the management of the diocesan house in Mukačevo falls on him. However, the following year, the bishop returned to Mukačevo and by decree of April 27, 1939, Hegumen Averky was appointed the first referent of the Diocesan Administration, leaving the post of rector of the parish and teacher of the Law of God at the state gymnasium. By the decision of the Holy Synod of the Serbian Orthodox Church dated June 21, 1939, in the Assumption Church of the monastery in the village of Domboki, on July 2, 1939, Bishop Vladimir (Rajić) of Mukačevo and Prešov, Hegumen Averky was elevated to the rank of protosyncellus.

=== Life in Yugoslavia and Germany ===
On July 5, 1940, having received canonical release from Bishop Vladimir (Rajić) to transfer to the jurisdiction of the Synod of Bishops of the Russian Orthodox Church Outside of Russia, he went in early 1941 from Užhorod to Belgrade and was appointed second priest and sacristan of the Russian Holy Trinity Church in Belgrade. He served under Metropolitan Anastasius (Gribanovsky), taught pastoral theology and homiletics at missionary and pastoral courses, gave a systematic course of lectures on spiritual topics at the Russian House, was chairman of the educational department of the Belgrade Parish Council and organized religious and educational meetings. After the death of Archbishop Theophan (Gavrilov) in June 1943, he was the guardian of the miraculous Kursk-Root Icon of the Sign, with which he fearlessly visited the homes of Russian Belgraders and served prayer services during the bombing. On March 23, 1944, he was awarded the right to wear a gold pectoral cross with decorations. On September 7 of the same year, he was appointed a priest to the house church at the Synod of Bishops of the Russian Orthodox Church Outside of Russia.

On September 8, 1944, a few weeks before the Soviet troops entered Belgrade, he and the Synod of Bishops were evacuated to Vienna. On September 19, 1944, together with Metropolitan Anastasius (Gribanovsky) and 13 other people, he arrived in Germany. On September 28, 1944, he was elevated to the rank of Archimandrite. On November 10, 1944, employees and members of the ROCOR Synod of Bishops moved from Vienna to Karlsbad (now Karlovy Vary). In connection with the new approach of Red Army, Metropolitan Anastasius and the staff of the ROCOR Synod of Bishops, with the assistance of General Andrey Vlasov in mid-April 1945 left Carlsbad for Bavaria, where they were caught by the end of the war. At that time, he traveled a lot, caring for Russian people who found themselves in a foreign land. One of Archimandrite Averky's main concerns was to save Orthodox Russian youth from the influence of "corrupting fashion." In order to preserve selfesteem, inner peace and love for Russia, he began to create St. Vladimir's youth societies. By decree of November 17, 1945, he was appointed rector of the Synodal House Church of Equal-to-the-Apostles Grand Duke Vladimir in Munich. After living in Munich for six years, Archimandrite Averky was a law teacher at the Merciful Samaritan Gymnasium in Munich and the Gymnasium of people without nationality in the displaced persons camp in the Schutzstaffel barracks, as well as at the Sisters of Mercy courses at the Merciful Samaritan House. He visited refugee camps in Germany with the Kursk-Root Icon, and he actively attended most of the Russian gymnasiums in both the British and American zones. He was in contact with many leaders of the youth movement of Russian emigration, and repeatedly gave lectures on spiritual topics in youth circles and camps for displaced persons.

He became a full member of the Peter and Paul Brotherhood, established on July 11, 1948 in Germany to preach Eastern Orthodoxy to native peoples of Europe. When the chairman of the brotherhood, Bishop John (Garklavs), went to serve in America in July 1949, Archimandrite Averky was appointed chairman. In addition to chairing the Peter and Paul Brotherhood, Archimandrite Averky assumed the responsibility of censoring all literature produced by the brotherhood. Archimandrite Averky visited the camps of Big and Small Schleißheim every time, accompanying the Kursk-Root Icon and Metropolitan Anastasius (Gribanovsky). Archimandrite Averky maintained a spiritual and prayerful relationship with many of the camp residents even after moving to the United States. Former Schleißheim inhabitants later remembered Archimandrite Averky with love, noting that he was a spiritual, kind, attentive pastor. While living in the United States, Archbishop Averky, in his sermons and articles, repeatedly referred to the period of his ministry in the camps of displaced persons, trying to comprehend this time as favorable for the salvation of the Christian soul.

=== Activities in the United States ===
In 1948, the mass migration of Russian emigrants from Europe to the New World began. On November 24, 1950, the First Hierarch of ROCOR, Metropolitan Anastasius (Gribanovsky), arrived in the United States for permanent residence, thus moving the administrative center of ROCOR there. In 1950, Archimandrite Averky was appointed by the ROCOR Synod of Bishops to the post of chairman of the Missionary and Educational Committee at the Synod of Bishops. On January 23 of the same year, he flew on a Flying Tiger plane to Idlewild Airport, near New York, delivering the Kursk-Root Icon of the Mother of God to American land.

On February 5, 1951, he was appointed a teacher at Holy Trinity Theological Seminary in Jordanville, New York. On February 17, 1952, Archimandrite Averky was confirmed by the Synod as Rector of the seminary, where he remained until his death. He lectured on the New Testament, liturgics, and homiletics. Since there were no special manuals on these subjects, he prepared lectures by typing them on a typewriter. Then they were multiplied on a rotator, after which the students received printed lectures. During his leadership, this educational institution was accredited by the University of the State of New York.

On May 23, 1953, he was elected titular bishop of Syracuse, vicar of the Diocese of Eastern America. On May 24, 1953, his consecration took place, which was made by the first hierarch of ROCOR, Metropolitan Anastasius (Gribanovsky), Archbishop Vitaly (Maximenko), Bishop Nikon (Rklitsky), Bishop Seraphim (Ivanov), Bishop James (Toombs) On May 12, 1960, forty days after the death of Archbishop Vitaly (Maximenko), Bishop Averky was elected rector of Holy Trinity Monastery at a general monastic meeting. On August 17, 1961, his title was changed to "of Syracuse and Holy Trinity," and Bishop Averky was elevated to the rank of archbishop.

From 1951 to 1988, his sermons, polemical and historical articles were actively published in the magazine Orthodox Russia. In 1958, the heading "Questions and Answers" appeared in the Orthodox Russia, which was led by bishop Averky. His articles were also published in the yearbook The Orthodox Way. Since 1964, he has been a permanent member of the ROCOR Synod of Bishops. He was chairman of the St. John of Kronstadt Charitable Foundation. Russian Russian Orthodox Church is the spiritual leader of the St. Vladimir Youth movement, created with the aim of "helping our Russian youth develop a correct Orthodox and national-Russian worldview, so that it becomes the guiding principle of life."

In the last years of his life, he was ill a lot and was in the hospital for a long time, but "the source of his sadness was not illness or human adversity, but a deep experience from the progressive apostasy in Christianity". The consolation for him were those days when he could write sermons for the magazine Orthodox Russia with inspiration. He died on April 10, 1976 at St. Luke's Hospital in Utica as a result of a stroke. He was buried in the crypt of the Trinity Cathedral of Holy Trinity Monastery in Jordanville.

== Basic ideas ==
He believed that true Christianity is preserved exclusively in the Eastern Orthodox Church. He emphasized that salvation can be achieved only through faithfulness to dogmas, canons, and tradition. In his writings, he often warned of the danger of departing from Orthodox teaching. One of the central themes of his theology was his harsh criticism of the ecumenical movement. He viewed ecumenism as a heresy leading to the erosion of the Orthodox faith. He wrote that ecumenism is a betrayal of Christ because it breaks down the boundaries between truth and error. His words are characteristic: "modernist liberals, uninvited 'reformers' of Orthodoxy, of which there are already many in all Orthodox local Churches, have created for themselves a kind of united front by joining the so-called ecumenical movement, which allegedly sets itself the task of uniting all Christians into a 'United Church', which has ceased to exist, allegedly due to the sinfulness of people, as a result of Impoverishment of the spirit of love to exist on earth… Joining this organization of the Orthodox people is unnatural, and not only unnatural, but also vicious and criminal".

He knew Russian Orthodox worship well, taught liturgics and prepared a course of lectures, which was published as a textbook and was widely distributed both among Russian emigrés and in Russia. He noted the importance of proper statutory worship. He insisted that performing divine services in an improper, careless manner and not according to the established order becomes a temptation for believers. He saw the reasons for this situation in the penetration of the "modernist spirit" into Church life even before the 1917 revolution, as well as in the fact that some of the newly appointed clergy did not know and did not understand worship. With a reverent and careful attitude to the Russian liturgical tradition, he realized that in modern conditions the literal fulfillment of all the norms of the Typicon is impractical, and therefore allowed certain reductions in worship. He complained that the original church singing and church reading, spiritual, dispassionate and sublime, was being replaced by emotional, passionate, stimulating earthly sensations and experiences. He considered the latter to be a borrowing from secular theater and a manifestation of the "modernist spirit" in the Church. He opposed any attempts to "modernize" Orthodox Christianity both in worship or theology. He believed that modernism is a form of secularization that penetrates the Church and undermines its spiritual foundations. He criticized the renovationists, who sought to reform Orthodox worship and dogma in favor of the spirit of the times. He believed that the Holy Scriptures should be read in the spirit of the patristic tradition, and not in a secular or academic context. One of Archbishop Averky's main works is his interpretations of the New Testament ("Guide to the Study of the Holy Scriptures of the New Testament"), where he explains the spiritual meaning of the Gospels and the Apostolic Epistles.

Archbishop Averky saw in the events of the 20th century signs of the approaching end of time. He wrote about the degradation of society, the departure of people from God, the growth of godlessness and moral decay. In his writings, he warned Orthodox Christians against being carried away by worldly values, pointing out the need for spiritual vigilance. He emphasized the importance of spiritual labor in Christian life, the struggle against sin, and the need for constant self-reflection. He taught about the need for repentance, prayer, fasting, and a careful spiritual life. He remained deeply devoted to the idea of Holy Russia. He viewed it not just as a state education, but as the spiritual ideal of the Orthodox people, which had been destroyed by the 1917 revolution. He sharply condemned communism, seeing in it a God-fighting ideology and believed that the revival of Russia was possible only through a return to the true Orthodox faith. For all his love for Russia, Bishop Averky also loved America. He liked the sedateness and tolerance of the average American. He believed that one of the main concerns of a pastor is the opportunity to present Eastern Orthodoxy at the level of a modern American

In a sermon on the 54th anniversary of the Murder of the Romanov family, he outlined the version that the murder was ritual and committed by Jewish servants of the coming antichrist, "It is a small consolation for us that the direct murder of the royal family was not committed by Russian hands, but by the hands of non-Orthodox and non-Russian people. Although this is true, the entire Russian people are guilty of this terrible, unprecedented atrocity, because they did not resist, did not prevent it".

== Literature ==
- Корнилов, Александр (2008). Белое духовенство лагеря Шляйсгайм (PDF). XVIII Ежегодная богословская конференция ПСТГУ: Материалы (in Russian). Vol. I. pp. 293–302.
- Подмошенский, Герман (2009). Святитель Аверкий Джорданвилльский. Герой свято-русской совести. Библиотека журнала «Русский Паломник» (in Russian). Moscow: Русский Паломник : Валаамское О-во Америки. ISBN 978-5-98644-014-9.
- Каплин, Александр (2012). "Предисловие" (PDF). In Сост., предисл., прим., указ. имен А. Д. Каплин; Отв. ред. О. А. Платонов (ed.). Современность в свете Слова Божия (in Russian). Moscow: Институт русской цивилизации. pp. 5–25.
- Данилец, Юрий (2016). "Миссионерская деятельность архиепископа Аверкия (Таушева) на Закарпатье (1931–1940 гг.)". ΧΡΟΝΟΣ: церковно-исторический альманах (in Russian) (3): 50–65.
- Кострюков, Андрей (2021). Русская Зарубежная Церковь при митрополите Филарете (Вознесенском) (in Russian). Moscow: Издательство ПСТГУ. pp. 6, 8, 17, 31, 35–37, 41, 43, 55–57, 106, 188, 194–196, 211, 249, 271, 279, 281, 285, 290, 355, 388, 389, 412, 417, 463. ISBN 978-5-7429-1388-7.
- Рева, Константин (2022). "Регламентация богослужебной практики в наследии святителя Иоанна (Максимовича) и архиепископа Аверкия (Таушева)" (PDF). Актуальные вопросы церковной науки (in Russian) (2): 25–32.
