= Holy Trinity Monastery (Jordanville, New York) =

- U.S. National Register of Historic Places
- U.S. Historic district
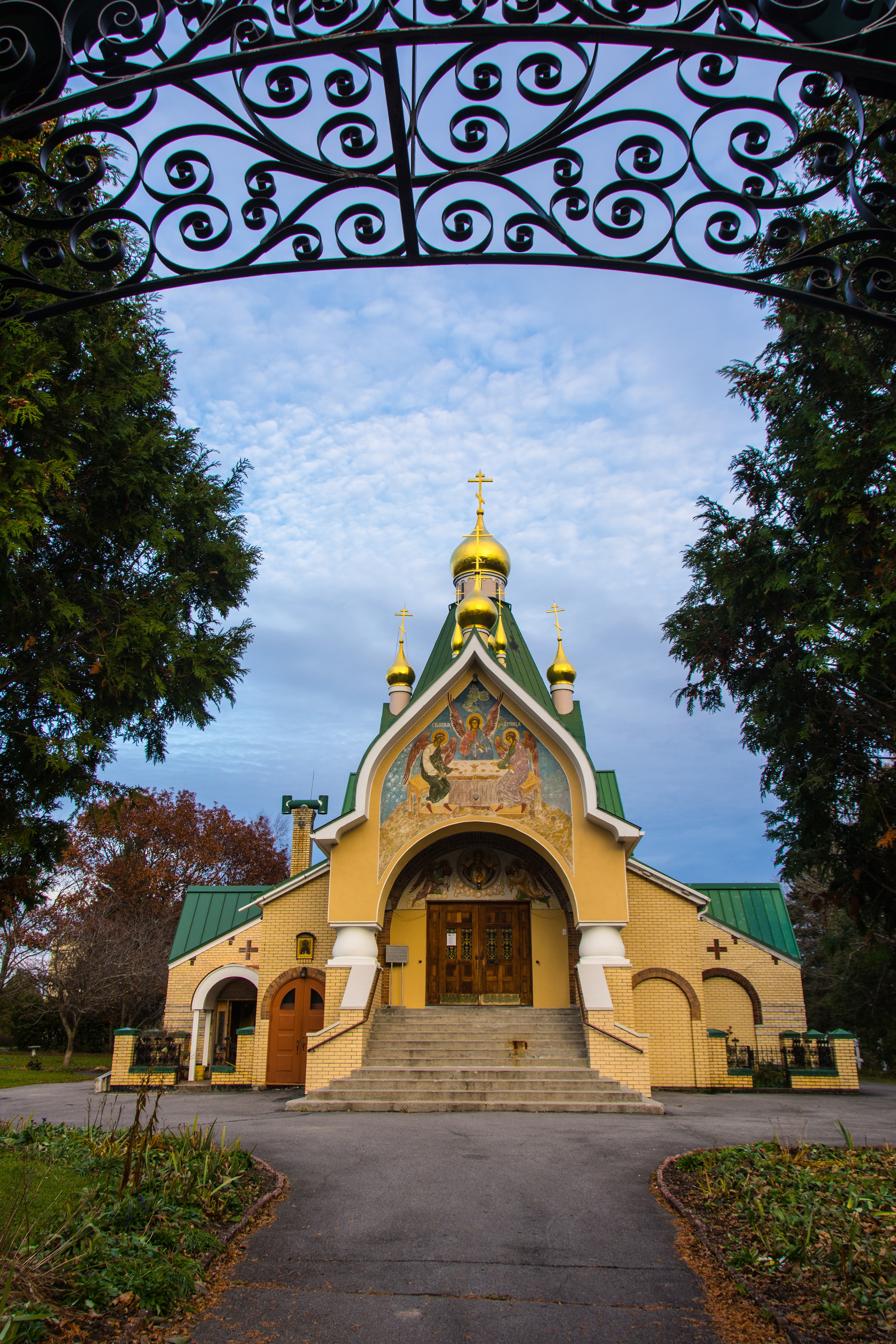
- Holy Trinity Cathedral, main church of the Monastery

- Location within New York Location within the United States
- Interactive map of Holy Trinity Monastery
- Nearest city: 1407 Robinson Road, Jordanville, New York
- Coordinates: 42°55′39″N 74°56′02″W
- Area: 750 acres (300 ha)
- Architect: R.N. Verkovsky (Main Church), Dimitri Blachev (Chapel by the Lake)
- NRHP reference No.: 09000286
- Added to NRHP: June 23, 2011

Holy Trinity Monastery (Russian: Свя́то-Тро́ицкий монасты́рь, Svyato-Troitsky Monastyr) is a male stavropegial monastery of the Russian Orthodox Church Outside of Russia (ROCOR), located near Jordanville, New York. Founded in 1930 by two Russian immigrants, it eventually became a main spiritual center of Russian Orthodoxy in the West. The monastery is well known for its publishing work and for the attached Holy Trinity Orthodox Seminary, which has educated many clergymen in ROCOR and other Orthodox jurisdictions. Due to their closeness to the hamlet, both the monastery and seminary are often simply referred to as Jordanville. The monastery is dedicated to the Holy Trinity, and its patronal feast day is Pentecost. The campus includes a museum that is open to the public.

== History ==
Hieromonk Panteleimon (Nizhnik), after spending ten years at St. Tikhon's Orthodox Monastery near South Canaan, Pennsylvania, wanted to live a more rigorous monastic life. Moreover, after a 1926 split between ROCOR and the group which would later become the Orthodox Church in America, he wanted to stay with the Church Abroad. He shared this desire with Ivan Kolos, a local choir director living at the monastery. Together they decided to find a place to live a “genuine monk’s life.” They traveled to Herkimer County in Upstate New York, where they bought the Starkweather farm near Jordanville for a $25 down payment. In order to pay off the mortgage, Panteleimon worked at the Sikorsky Airplane Factory in Stratford, Connecticut as a wing mechanic, while Kolos remained at his parish.

In the spring after Pascha in 1930, Fr. Panteleimon moved onto the property, while Ivan Kolos and another monk from St. Tikhon's, Fr. James (Mosheruk), worked at the Sikorsky factory until the land was paid off and they could go to Jordanville. Life was hard: they lived in a small building, kept a horse and cow, and instead of a stove used hot stones to cook their food. In addition to performing the daily services, the brotherhood worked the land and began dairy production. With the help of a new member of the brotherhood, Hieromonk Ilya (Gavriliuk), who was a carpenter, the monks began building a large house with a chapel and room for sixteen cells, and completed it in 1935.

The new monastic building was consecrated by Bishop Vitaly (Maximenko) on June 17, 1935. However, at the very end of the divine liturgy the smell of burning wood filled the air. Crying, “the church is afire!” in Russian, Vitaly and the other monks helped get the assembled worshippers to safety. The uninsured building, valued at $10,000, burnt to the ground. Sheltered in a wagon shed, the monks refused to despair and decided to build an even better structure. The small brotherhood soon bought another, larger house nearby, bought another 200 acres of land, and began farming and dairy operations. They also obtained a printing press and a linotype machine and began publishing spiritual works. They also interacted with the local community: a few of the monks held a concert at an Episcopalian parish in Richfield Springs, and members of the nearby Baptist church visited the monastery for a service.

In 1946, fourteen new monks arrived at Jordanville, headed by Bishop Seraphim (Ivanov). These included some of the future leaders of the Russian Church Abroad, including the future Metropolitan Laurus (Škurla), who was then Novice Vasily. The brotherhood was originally based in the St. Job of Pochaev Monastery in Ladomirová, Czechoslovakia, which had been founded by Archbishop Vitaly when he was still an archimandrite. After a brief stay in Munich, the Brotherhood accepted the invitation of Bishop Vitaly to join the struggling Brotherhood at Jordanville, resulting in the largest Orthodox Monastery in America. The Brotherhood of St. Job brought St. Job's printing press with them across the Atlantic, and, until the fall of the Soviet Union, Holy Trinity Monastery was the only place in the world that could typeset in Church Slavonic.

In 1944 construction began on a new monastery cathedral, with many of the bricks salvaged from a demolished factory. The cathedral was designed by Roman Verhovskoy, and the head of the building committee was Nicholas Alexander (Aleksandrov), a professor at Rhode Island State College and the future dean of the seminary. The cornerstone of the church was laid in 1947, and the church was completed in 1951; the Governor of New York, Thomas E. Dewey, attended the dedication. The construction of the church was greatly aided by the nearly 50 monks and lay-workers who had joined the monastery after leaving post-war Europe. Among them was Archimandrite Cyprian (Pyzhov), who had with his assistant monk Alypy (Gamanovich) (future Archbishop of Chicago) frescoed the interior of the church, covering the 700 square feet of walls with over 400 icons. New monastic quarters were built from 1954 to 1957. In addition to building up the monastery, Jordanville monks also helped set up parishes in Albany and Utica.

On December 3, 2011, on the feast day of the Entry of the Theotokos into the Temple, government officials came to the monastery, enjoyed food, and listened to talks held in the seminary hall, where the official ceremony making the monastery a national historic district took place. The district includes 41 contributing buildings, 3 contributing sites, 2 contributing structures, and 3 contributing objects.

== Abbots ==
- Archimandrite Panteleimon (Nizhnik) (1930–1946)
- Archbishop Seraphim (Ivanov) (1946–1948)
- Archbishop Vitaly (Maximenko) (1948–1960)
- Archbishop Averky (Taushev) (1960–1975)
- Metropolitan Laurus (Škurla) (1975–2008)
- Bishop Luke (Murianka) (2008–present)

== Holy Trinity Monastery Cemetery ==
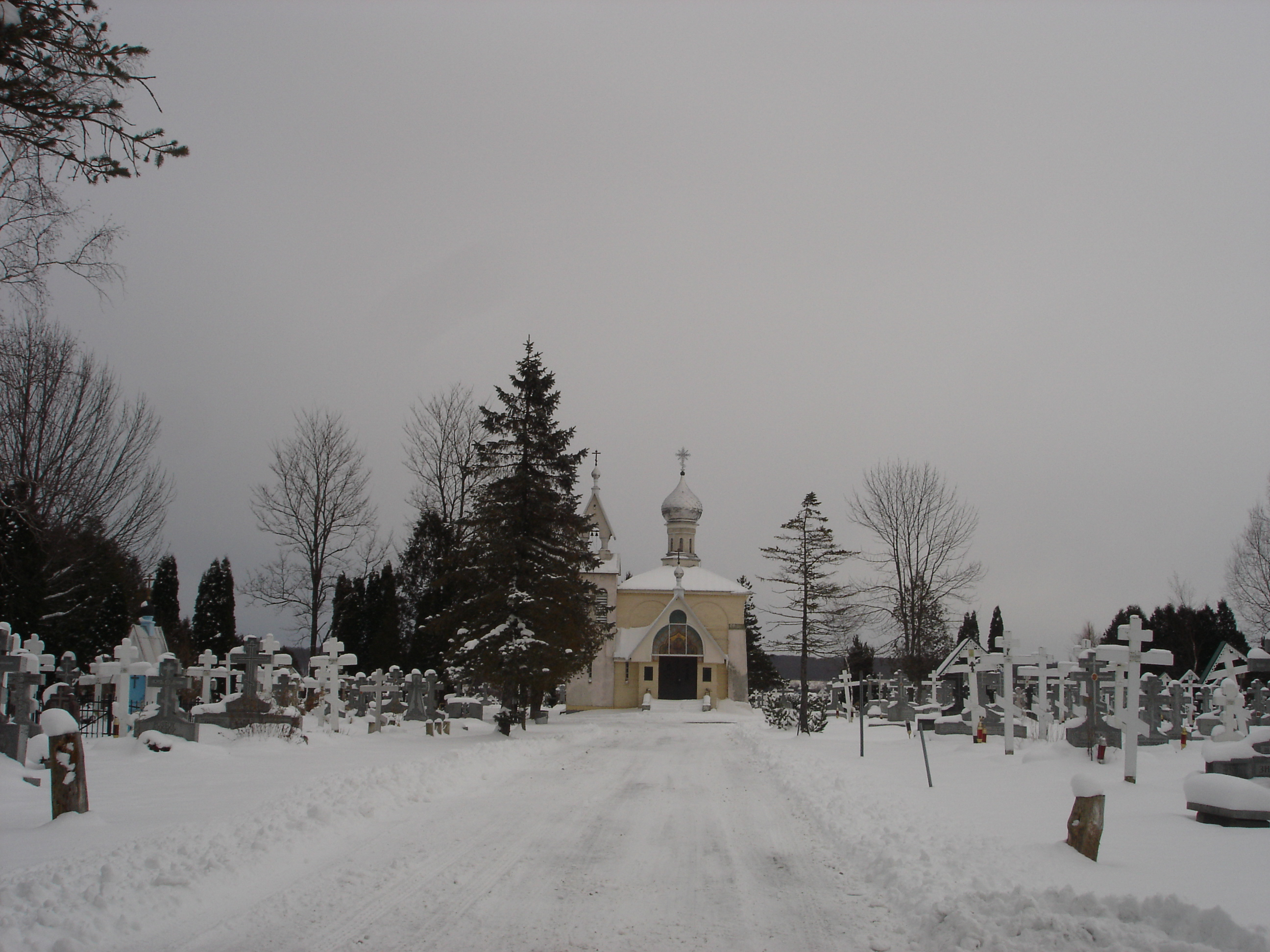
Cemetery with Chapel

The monastery maintains several cemeteries on its property, which collectively make up one of the largest Eastern Orthodox cemeteries in the United States. The monastery regularly prays for everyone buried in the cemetery at the divine liturgy and panikhida services. Moreover, many renowned hierarchs and notable individuals in ROCOR's history are buried at Jordanville. In a crypt at the east end of the monastery cathedral are buried, among others, Metropolitans Laurus (Škurla) and Philaret (Voznesensky), Archbishop Averky (Taushev), and Archimandrite Cyprian (Pyzhov), the renowned icon painter.

== Holy Trinity Monastery Icon and Mounting Studio ==
"Holy Trinity Icon Mounting Studio has been producing high quality print icons painted by the Fathers of Holy Trinity Monastery as well as other iconographers for many years."

== Publishing ==
The roots of the monastery's strong publishing division can be traced to the Pochayiv Lavra in modern-day Ukraine. There, Archimandrite Vitaly (Maximenko) had run the printing press, which included 150 monastic workers and 8 printing presses. With the outbreak of World War I and the Russian Revolution publishing operations came to a halt. Archimandrite Vitaly escaped to Ladomirová, Czechoslovakia, where he founded a new monastic brotherhood, the Brotherhood of St. Job of Pochaev, to continue the work of the Lavra. This new brotherhood, under the authority of ROCOR, began publishing many new publications, including the periodicals Pravoslavnaia Rus, Pravoslavnyi Put, and the Pravoslavnyi Kalendar, which contains the rubrics for all the Sundays and major feasts of the church calendar. All three of these publications are still being published by Holy Trinity Monastery. By 1934, the brotherhood was publishing three-quarters of all ROCOR publications, which were being read in 45 countries. However, with the advance of the Soviet Army in 1944, the brotherhood fled Czechoslovakia. Half the brotherhood, under the leadership of Archimandrite Seraphim (Ivanov), emigrated to the United States, where they joined the Jordanville brotherhood, which had already been printing books on a small scale.

At Jordanville, the Brotherhood of St. Job of Pochaev began publishing on the same level as they had in Czechoslovakia. In addition to Orthodox periodicals, they published service books, multi-volume editions of the lives of the saints, and many other religious works. Publishing became one of the major sources of income for the monastery. During the Cold War, the monastery was the largest publisher of Russian religious literature outside of the Soviet Union, and according to the monastery's publication website many behind the Iron Curtain remembered Jordanville as being practically their only source of Orthodox books. To supplement in-house printing, the monastery also outsourced some titles to be published in New York and Japan.

The monastery has now stopped all in-house printing due to costs and is outsourcing all publishing to outside printers. However, it is still continuing to translate, edit, and publish new works in both print and digital formats. According to the publications website, the monastery hopes to publish four to eight new titles a year. Recent titles include the Psalter for Prayer, a new translation of the Psalter from Church Slavonic, stylistically based on Myles Coverdale's translation of the psalms in the Book of Common Prayer.

In addition to publishing work, the monastery also operates a bookstore which began operation in 1990 with the expansion of the monastery building. It sells (both in-store and online) both monastery publications and books and other media from Orthodox suppliers from around the world.

== Buildings ==
Image	Name	Built	Note
	Holy Trinity Cathedral with lower church of Saint Job of Pochaev	1945—1950	The project of the Cathedral in the style of tented-roof churches of Northern Russia made by architect Roman Verkhovsky. In 1946 the construction of the cathedral began. By 1947, the lower Church was done; it was consecrated on November 14, 1948. The final construction and interior decoration of the Trinity Cathedral was completed by the autumn of 1950. 26 November 1950 the great consecration was performed.
	Monastic Dormitory	1952–1958, 1987—1988	The brotherly building of the monastery was founded on September 28, 1952, and built by 1958. Bakery, book warehouses and storerooms placed in the basement; printing house, refectory, bookstore placed on the first floor; office, a folding and bookbinding workshops, Abbot's chambers placed on the second floor; cells are on the third and fourth floors. In 1987-1988 the building was significantly expanded, with two new wings attached to the West and East sides. November 17, 1991 consecrated The chapel to the Optina Elders.
	Holy Trinity Orthodox Seminary building	1971	On the 1st floor there is a library, on the 2nd — an Assembly hall and a Museum, on the 3rd — administrative premises, classrooms and an archive.
	Church of the Dormition of the Theotokos at Monastery Cemetery	1968—1977	The memorial church dedicated to Nicholas II of Russia, his family, and «all who put their lives in the fight against godless communism for Russia, tortured and killed in turmoil». Consecrated on September 26, 1977. Faithful in the local community gather for akathist services as well. Vigil and Liturgy are served on the Feast of the Dormition in the English language.
	Two-tiered tented roof Belltower with Holy Gates	1987—1988	It has 2 extensions topped with gold-plated domes. In the South Annex located a baptistery. The Western pediment in 2006 is decorated with mosaic "Descent of the Holy spirit on Apostles".
	Saint John of Kronstadt and Saint John of Rila Chapel in the Woods	1979—1998	It is situated in a remote wooded area of the monastery next to a lake. It is built of weighty rough-hewn cobblestones in the traditional Byzantine style. The roof was made similar to the samples of the North Russian architecture and crowned with a scaly wooden crown with an eight-pointed cross. Consecrated on November 16, 1998. Chapel is not heated and without electricity. Chapel is used for occasional English-language services, mostly in the warmer months.
