= Congrua =

Congrua may refer to:

- the plural of congruum, in mathematics, the difference of an arithmetic progression of squares
- congrua portio, the lowest sum proper for the yearly income of a cleric
