= Luke Murianka =

Russian Orthodox clergy (born 1951)

The Right Reverend Bishop Luke of Syracuse Vicar of The Eastern American Diocese
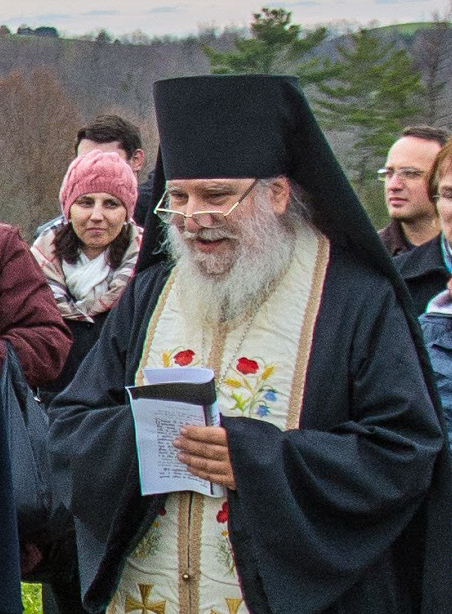
- Luke
- Diocese: Eastern American Diocese

Personal details
- Born: Mark Murianka; November 10, 1951 (age 74) Philadelphia, Pennsylvania, U.S.
- Denomination: Russian Orthodox Church Outside of Russia
- Residence: New York, U.S.
- Parents: Peter Murianka; Olga Murianka
- Education: Hartwick College, Holy Trinity Orthodox Seminary, Syracuse University

Bishop Luke (secular name Mark Murianka, Russian: Марк Петрович Мурьянка; November 10, 1951) is an American church leader. He serves as bishop of the Russian Orthodox Church Outside Russia, current abbot of Holy Trinity Monastery, rector, associate professor of patrology of Holy Trinity Orthodox Seminary in Jordanville, New York, and auxiliary bishop of Syracuse, New York.

== Career ==
He was born on November 10, 1951, in Philadelphia, Pennsylvania, to Orthodox parents, Peter and Olga, who emigrated from Carpatho-Russian village in the early twentieth century. As he said: "All of my ancestors hail from the same region of Carpathian Russia. My paternal grandfather organized parishes under the Russian Church when he arrived in America. It was he who brought me into the altar for the first time to serve when I was four years old. On my mother’s side, there are many generations of priests and four bishops, one of whom was a confessor for Orthodoxy against the Uniate heresy. My parents guided with simple Christian wisdom, and my father piously and conscientiously worked out his salvation as a funeral director, by burying all of the Orthodox Christians in Philadelphia"

Since 1979, he has been teaching the New Testament, apologetics, and comparative theology at the Holy Trinity Seminary in Jordanville. He pronounced his monastic vows in 1980.

Luke was ordained as a hieromonk on July 12, 1981, by Bishop Laurus (Škurla) of Syracuse. He served in the Holy Trinity Monastery. Luke became the serving priest of the mission that is now Christ the Savior parish, located in Wilkes-Barre, Pennsylvania.

In 1982, hieromonk Luke became the dean of students of the Holy Trinity Seminary.

On October 21, 1991, the Synod of Bishops of ROCOR decided to raise Luke to the rank of hegumen for his monastic obedience and for his hard work for Holy Trinity Seminary.

On December 17, 2003, the Synod appointed Luke to the newly-created Commission of the Russian Orthodox Church Outside of Russia, on talks with the corresponding Commission of the Moscow Patriarchate.

The Synod included Luke in the official delegation to attend the ceremony of signing of the Act of Canonical Communion, held on April 18–20, 2007 in Moscow.

Luke was elected abbot of the Holy Trinity Monastery on May 21, 2008. In September 2008, Synod appointed him as rector of Holy Trinity Orthodox Seminary in Jordanville.

On May 5, 2009, the Council of Bishops of the ROCOR (Council) decided to include Luke in the commission to study the relationship with the Orthodox Church in America, whose task was to restore the Eucharistic communion with the Church.

On December 6, 2018, the Synod elected Luke as Bishop of Syracuse and Vicar of the Eastern American Diocese. Metropolitan Hilarion of Eastern America and New York sent an appeal for the confirmation of this election to Patriarch Kirill of Moscow. The election was confirmed on December 28, 2018.

On February 11, 2019, in Holy Trinity Monastery in Jordanville, Metropolitan Hilarion (Kapral) of Eastern America and New York, Metropolitan Luke (Kovalenko) of Zaporozhye and Melitopol, Archbishop Gabriel (Chemodakov) of Montreal and Canada, and Bishop Nicholas (Olhovsky) of Manhattan nominated Luke as Bishop and Vicar and consecrated Luke a bishop the next morning.

== Writings ==
- «Reflections on the 200th Anniversary of the French Revolution» // Orthodox Life, 1989; pp. 21–30, pp. 21–33
- An Answer to the Orthodox Church in America’s Document 'Why Deepen the Schism?' // Orthodox Life, Vol. 40, № 6 (Nov-Dec 1990), pp. 10–26
- Commentary on latest Recommendations of Joint Commission for Theological Dialogue between the Orthodox and Oriental Orthodox Churches // Orthodox Life, vol. 42, no. 3 (May–June 1991), pp. 5–18.
- «Concerning the Tradition of Long Hair and Beards» // Orthodox Life, Vol. 45, No. 5 (Sept-Oct 1995), pp. 41–43
- New Age Philosophy, Orthodox Thought, and Marriage // Orthodox Life, No. 3, 1997
- “A Patristic Reading of Flaubert’s Madame Bovary” // Orthodox Life. 2001. pp. 38–49
  - «Мадам Бовари» Флобера и святоотеческое учение о грехе // Новый журнал. — Нью-Йорк, 2003. — Кн. 231. — С. 191—209. (Russian translation)
- Aleksei Khomiakov : A Study of the Interplay of Piety and Theology // A.S. Khomiakov : Poet, Philosopher, Theologian / edited by V. Tsurikov; Editorial Board H. Baran, R. Bird, P. Hunt, A. Klimoff, P. Valliere; Forew. by М. Раева; Afterword by R. Bird. — Jordanville, N.Y. : Holy Trinity Seminary, 2004. — 20-37. — (Readings in Russian Religious Culture; Vol.2)
- Report by Archimandrite Luke (Murianka) on the First Meeting of the Negotiating Committees of the Russian Orthodox Church Outside of Russia and the Moscow Patriarchate // pravoslavie.ru, July 2/15, 2004
- Миссия Русской Православной Церкви Заграницей (доклад) // pravoslavie.ru, May 14, 2006
- Archimandrite Flor (Vanko): December 9, 1926 — September 4, 2012 // Orthodox Life, No. 6 2012
  - «Архимандрит Флор (Ванько) (+04.09.2012)» // «Церковный вестник», 20 ноября 2012
- St. Alexis, a resolute zealot for Orthodoxy // pravoslavie.ru, October 16, 2015
- “I Was Born This Way” is Not the Utterance of a Christian // orthodoxlife.org, February 22, 2018
