= Ladomirová =

- Municipality
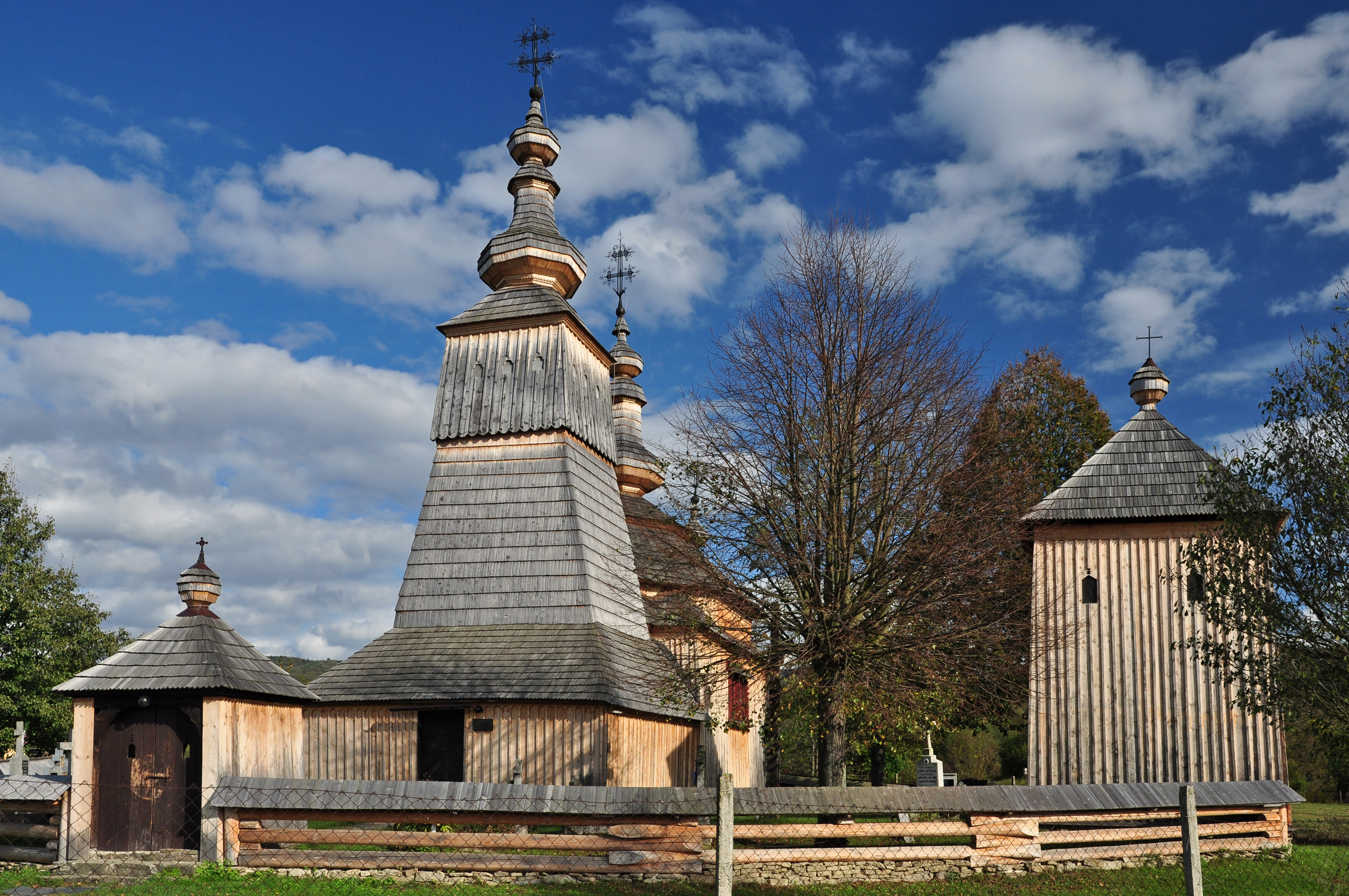

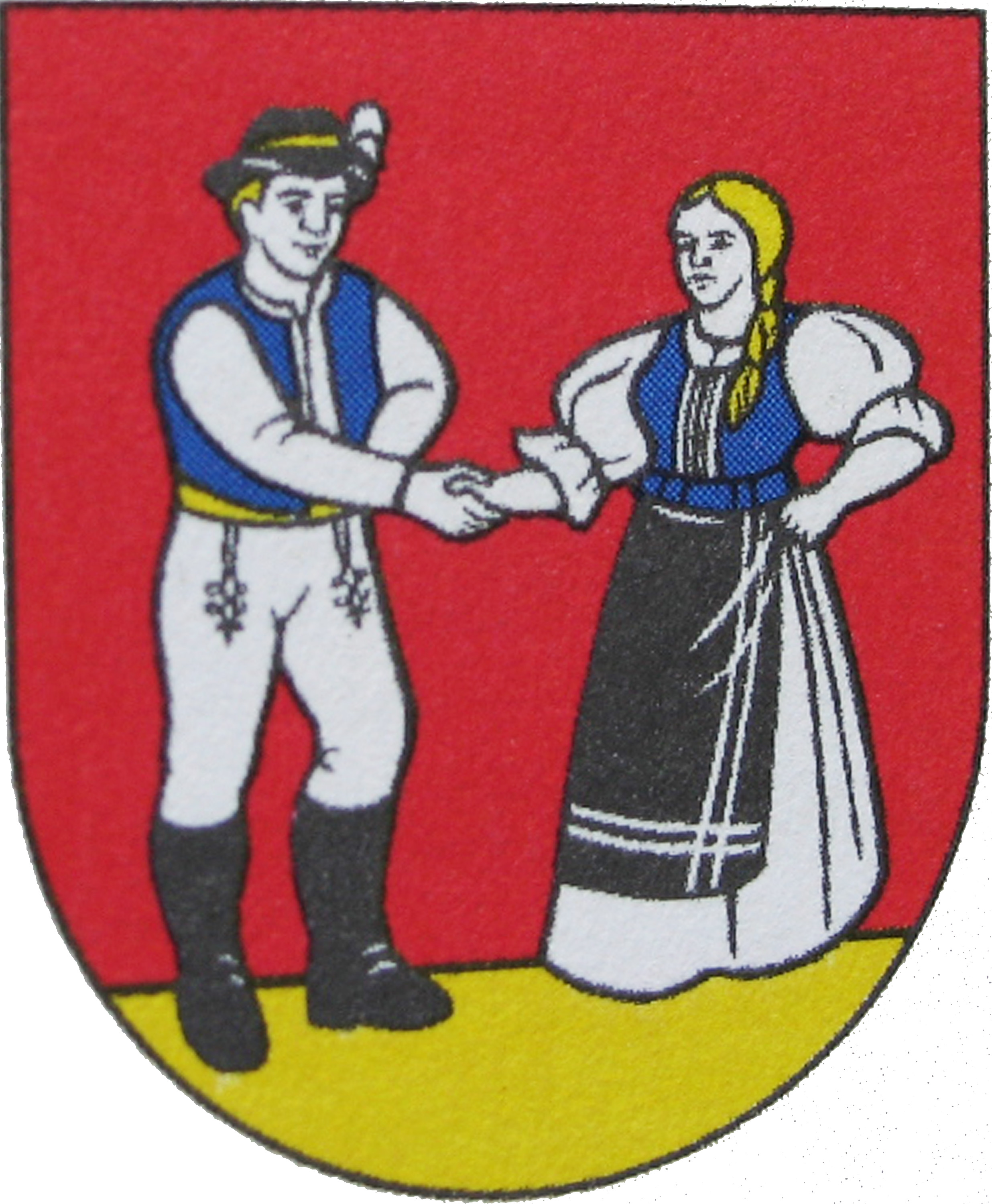
- Flag Coat of arms

- Location of Ladomirová in the Prešov Region Location of Ladomirová in Slovakia
- Coordinates: 49.33°N 21.62°E
- Country: Slovakia
- Region: Prešov Region
- District: Svidník District
- First mentioned: 1414

Area
  - Total: 15.39 km^{2} (5.94 sq mi)
- Elevation: 262 m (860 ft)

Population (2025)
  - Total: 1,065
- Time zone: UTC+1 (CET)
  - Summer (DST): UTC+2 (CEST)
- Postal code: 900 3
- Area code: +421 54
- Vehicle registration plate (until 2022): SK
- Website: www.ladomirova.sk

Ladomirová (Hungarian: Ladomérvágása; Rusyn: Ладомирова) is a village and municipality in Svidník District in the Prešov Region of north-eastern Slovakia.

The Church of Saint Michael the Archangel of Ladomirová, a wooden Greek Catholic church built in 1742, is part of the Carpathian Wooden Churches UNESCO World Heritage Site. In historical records the village was first mentioned in 1414. The municipality lies at an altitude of 263 metres and covers an area of 15.4 km^{2}. It has a population of about 862 people.

== Geography ==
The municipality lies at an altitude of 262 metres (860 ft) and covers an area of 15.39 km^{2} (5.94 sq mi) (2025).

== History ==
The village was founded during the Wallachian colonization on the right of purchase in 1427 and was not taxed. In the medieval Kingdom of Hungary, from the local fortress, which was later transformed into a manor house, the castellans administered the eastern part of the Makovica castle estate.

In the second half of the 14th century, the Cudar family, the owners of Makovice, intensified the colonization of their manor even after 1364, also on the basis of modified German law. They expanded and enriched their property by further settlement or re-establishment of settlements, even so intensively that they got into financial difficulties and in 1414 they backed up part of their estate to John Bebek de Pelsőc. Newly established settlements were also backed up, including Ladomirová. In the years 1415–1416, the property auction of the territory and seat of the Makovice estate was confirmed by the donation of King Sigismund and the Jáger Chapter.

The medieval estate of Makovica was later divided into three districts - castle (hradný), Kurim (kurimský) and Ladomir (ladomirský). The Ladomir district, today's Ladomirová, was of substantial and strategic importance. Therefore, from Makovice came suggestions for the settlement of the area to the east and north of this village.

A trade route from Potisia to Poland led through the village. Before 1458, in Ladomirová, royal tolls were collected at the toll station on the new trade-military crossing into Poland across the Dukliansky Pass, the importance of which had been growing since the middle of the 15th century. The manor is mentioned as a castellum.

In the second half of the 15th century and at the beginning of the 16th century, it was held by rich magnates from Rozhanovce. The commercial frequency of the country road is also evidenced by a newer find of a vessel with about five golden ducats of Hungarian king Matthias Corvinus (one piece is in the collection of the Museum of Ukrainian and Ruthenian Culture in Svidník under accession number 11/78).

In the 15th century, it was the easternmost and northernmost village in the valley of Ladomirka, Sáros County. At that time, the Cudar family built a manor house here, which also existed in the 16th century.

The village of Ladomirová is mentioned in the chateau - an order of Pál Rákóczi (since 1626, lord-lieutenant of Sáros and Torna counties) of December 30, 1624, where he declared the privilege by which he freed from robots a lord from the village of Ladomir. Instead of compulsory robots, it has to pay annually for the feast of St. Michael the Archangel was 10 florins and one marten skin.

From the 18th and 19th centuries, the Ladomírskovci owned property here.

In 1600, the estate had 16 inhabited serf houses, a dwelling of Šoltýs, a mill, a toll booth, a church, a rectory, a school and a manor house. In 1787 the village had 102 houses and 720 inhabitants, in 1828 128 houses and 946 inhabitants, in 1942 it had 164 houses and 879 inhabitants (at that time it was the largest village in the Svidník district), who subsisted on farming, raised cattle and they worked in the woods.

The historical development in the village and the construction of peasant dwellings were built next to the road and it can be typologically classified that it has the character of an irregular distribution of individual houses.

Until the beginning of the Second World War, there were only log houses in the village with a barn and a shovel under a common high hipped thatched roof. During the restoration of the war-torn houses, brick houses with several rooms were already being built, which still have the character of log buildings. The concept of building houses and villages, began to change in the 60s of the 20th century.

At the beginning of the 20th century, linen weaving, carriage knitting, and the production of woodworking tools were widespread in the village.

After the First World War, Russian Orthodox monks settled in the village, who built the Orthodox Church of St. Archangel Michael. They founded the Orthodox monastery of St. Job of Pochaev, which in the 1920s was home to many famous clergymen and monks from former Russian Empire, who were under the jurisdiction of the Russian Orthodox Church Outside Russia. Ladomirová became a major center of publishing activity in the interwar period.

In the autumn of 1944, a large tank battle of the Carpathian-Dukla operation took place near the village. Ladomirová was liberated on November 26, 1944. At that time, Vít Nejedlý conducted a military music concert for the last time on 11 December 1944 in the local inn "U Gajdoša". A commemorative plaque is placed to commemorate these moments. The village was almost completely destroyed, rebuilt after liberation.

State property was established in 1954. In the 1990s, activity in prosperous state property was terminated. Most of the inhabitants worked in industrial plants in Svidník.

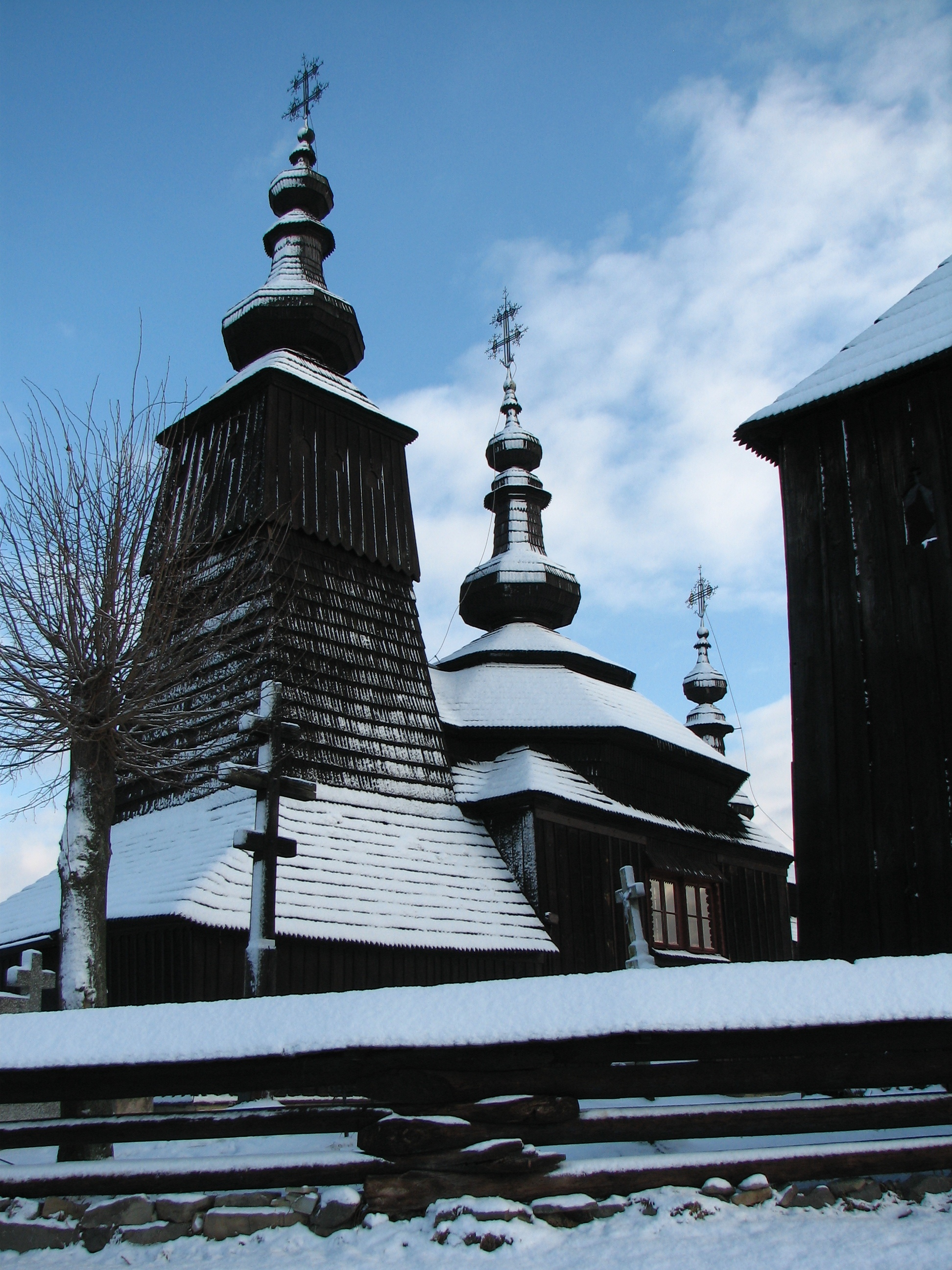
Wooden church in Ladomirova

== Population ==
Population statistic (10 years)
Year	1995	2005	2015	2025
Count	781	868	1024	1065
Difference		+11.13%	+17.97%	+4.00%

Population statistic
Year	2024	2025
Count	1064	1065
Difference		+0.09%

It has a population of 1065 people (31 December 2025).

=== Ethnicity ===
Census 2021 (1+ %)
Ethnicity	Number	Fraction
Slovak	919	87.94%
Romani	407	38.94%
Rusyn	263	25.16%
Not found out	75	7.17%
Total	1045	

In year 2021 was 1045 people by ethnicity 919 as Slovak, 407 as Romani, 263 as Rusyn, 75 as Not found out, 5 as Czech, 5 as Ukrainian, 2 as Hungarian, 1 as Italian, 1 as Romanian, 1 as Polish and 1 as Greek.

Note on population: The difference values of population numbers in the table "Population statistic" and in the sections "Ethnicity" & "Religion" is caused by the use of various statistical methods.

=== Religion ===
Census 2021 (1+ %)
Religion	Number	Fraction
Greek Catholic Church	733	70.14%
Eastern Orthodox Church	186	17.8%
Roman Catholic Church	53	5.07%
None	53	5.07%
Total	1045	

In year 2021 was 1045 people by religion 733 from Greek Catholic Church, 186 from Eastern Orthodox Church, 53 from Roman Catholic Church, 53 from None, 10 from Not found out, 3 from Paganism and natural spirituality, 3 from Other, 2 from Calvinist Church, 1 from Other and not ascertained christian church and 1 from Evangelical Church.
