= Education in Czechoslovakia =

The education system in the former state of Czechoslovakia built on previous provision, which included compulsory education and was adapted in some respects to the ethnic diversity of the region. During the Communist period further progress was made in the school system towards equality in opportunity between regions and genders, but access to higher education depended upon the political compliance of students and their families. After the 'Velvet Revolution' in 1989 many reforms were introduced.

== Before the Communist era ==
Czechoslovakia (and its succession states) had a tradition of academic and scholarly endeavor in the mainstream of European thought and a history of higher education dating from the Middle Ages. Charles University was founded in Prague in 1348, and the Universitas Istropolitana (Academia Istropolitana) was founded in Bratislava in 1465.

Before World War I, education was the chief instrument for dealing with ethnic diversity. Perhaps in no other aspect of public life did Czechoslovakia more effectively address the disparities among Czechs, Slovaks, Hungarians, Ukrainians, and Germans. Eight years of compulsory education in the native language of each ethnic minority did much to raise literacy rates, particularly among Slovaks and Ukrainians. An expanded program of vocational education increased the technical skills of the country's growing industrial labor force. Some disparities remained, however. Germans and Czechs predominated disproportionately in secondary schools and universities. Both in the Czech lands and in Slovakia, compulsory education, had begun in 1774, on the initiative of Maria Theresa. In the Czech lands, prosperous farmers and even cottagers and tenants had a long history of boarding their children in towns or cities for secondary, vocational, and higher education.

== In the Communist era ==
Despite regional and ethnic imbalances, Czechoslovakia entered the Communist era with a literate, even highly educated, populace. Education under Communist Party of Czechoslovakia (KSC) rule has a history of periodic reforms (often attempting to fit the Soviet model) and efforts to maintain ideological purity within schools. At the same time, higher education was a reward for political compliance. By the mid-1970s, the historical disparity in educational resources between the Czech lands and Slovakia had been largely redressed. A certain equity in educational opportunity was achieved, partly through the concerted efforts of policy makers and partly through the vicissitudes of normalization.

=== System ===
In the 1980s, the Czechoslovak education system had four basic levels:

- nursery and kindergarten;
- 8-year primary schools; (until 1978: 9 years)
- various kinds of secondary schools; and
- a variety of institutions of higher education.

Education was compulsory between the ages of six and sixteen from 1984 (i.e. 10 years, 1922-1948: 8 years, 1948-1984: 9 years). In 1974-75 planners began an education reform, shortening the primary cycle from nine to eight years and standardizing curricula within the secondary-school system. The state financed education, and all textbooks and instructional material below the university level were free (returned at the end of the semester).

Secondary schools included gymnasia (stressing general education and preparation for higher education) and vocational schools (which emphasized technical training); both were four-year programs. A highly developed apprenticeship program and a system of secondary vocational or professional programs were attached to specific industries or industrial plants. In both secondary and higher education, provision was made for workers to attend evening study in combination with work-release time.

In 1985 there were 36 universities or university-level institutions of higher education, comprising 110 faculties; 23 were located in the Czech Socialist Republic, and 13 were located in the Slovak Socialist Republic. The mid-1970s reform shortened the course of study in most fields from five to four years. A 1980 law on higher education increased the control of the Czech and Slovak ministries of education over universities and technical colleges. Postgraduate study involved three to six years of study. Faculties could exist within a university system or as independent entities (as in the case of the six theological faculties under the direction of both republics' ministries of culture, or educational faculties sometimes administered directly by the republics' ministries of education).

The regime made intensive efforts to improve the educational status of women in the 1970s. The number of women who completed a course of higher education jumped by 93 percent between 1970 and 1980 (for men the increase was 48 percent). Although women continued to cluster in such traditionally female areas of employment as health care and teaching, their enrollment in many secondary schools outstripped that of men. Women have accounted for 40 percent of university enrollment since the mid-1960s. In the 1985–86 school year, this figure was 43 percent.

=== Admission ===
Educational enrollment and admissions were delicate matters during the socialist era. Virtually everyone attended primary school, and a majority of those of secondary-school age attended some kind of specialized training or a gymnasium. Beyond this, however, the questions surrounding university admissions (and who attends secondary schools and who becomes an apprentice) took on political overtones. In the 1950s the children of political prisoners, well-to-do farmers, or known adherents of one or another religion were victims of the party's discriminatory admissions policies. Youngsters of working-class or peasant background ostensibly had preference over those of other socioeconomic groups. However, a look at students' backgrounds during the 1950s and 1960s reveals that in no year did children of workers or peasants constitute a majority of those in institutions of higher education. Precise estimates vary, but through the mid-1960s workers' families gained an average of one-third of the admission slots, peasants a mere 10 percent, and "others" nearly 60 percent. The proletariat fared better in Slovakia, where nearly half of those with secondary school or university degrees came from workers' or peasants' families.

In 1971 the regime announced that "The selection of applicants must clearly be political in character. . . . We make no secret of the fact that we want to do this at the schools in a manner that will guarantee that future graduates will be supporters of socialism and that they will place their knowledge at the service of socialist society." This was the "principled class approach," a complex set of criteria that purportedly reflected a student's "talent, interest in the chosen field, class origins, civic and moral considerations, social and political activism of the parents, and the result of the admission examination." In practice, class background and parents' political activities outweighed all other factors. Children of dissidents, of those in political disfavor, or of open adherents of a religious sect were denied admission to higher education in favor of children whose parents were party members or who were of proletarian origin.

Amnesty International reported in 1980 that institutions ranked applicants according to the following criteria: students whose parents were both KSC members, children of farmers or workers, and those with one parent a KSC member. Students who failed to meet any of these conditions were considered last. Children of dissidents were effectively disqualified. The system allowed for some manipulation; a member of the intelligentsia without a political blot on his or her record might have taken a job as a worker temporarily to permit his child a claim to proletarian status. There were charges as well of bribes and corruption surrounding university admissions. Whatever the mechanism involved, the social composition of the student body shifted in the mid-1970s; roughly half of all students in higher education were from workers' or farmers' families.

Charter 77 protested discrimination in educational admissions based on parents' political activity; there was some indication by the late 1970s that, if parental sins could still be visited on the children, at least questions concerning their parents' past and present political affiliations would be less blatant. Whether or not politicizing university admissions ensured that graduates would be "supporters of socialism" could be debated. However, it is evident that in controlling university admissions the regime knew how to ensure acquiescence on the part of most Czechoslovak citizens. If a moderately secure livelihood and a reasonable standard of living were the regime's "carrots," excluding children of dissidents from higher education was one of its more formidable "sticks."

== 1990 – 1992 ==
After the 'Velvet Revolution' in 1989 the education system in Czechoslovakia underwent transformative changes. Democratisation of education began in 1990. Private schools and 6- and 8-year general secondary gymnasia were introduced. Academic freedom of higher education was restored and bachelor's degree programmes were implemented. In 1992 the first education programmes involving the support of European Commission were launched. Changes were also made to financing of education.

== Bibliography ==
Gawdiak, Ihor (1989). Czechoslovakia: a country study (3rd ed.). Federal Research Division & Library of Congress. ISSN 1057-5294.

Klatt, Malgorzata; Elliott, Kate (2016). Education Reforms and Youth Transitions in Central Europe: The Case of Poland.

Mauch, James (1994). "Universities in Transition in the Czech Republic: The Case of the University of South Bohemia" (PDF). Association for the Study of Higher Education (19th, Tucson, AZ, November 10-13, 1994).

Mitter, Wolfgang (2003). "A Decade of Transformation: Educational Policies in Central and Eastern Europe". International Review of Education. 49.
