= Johann von Gardner =

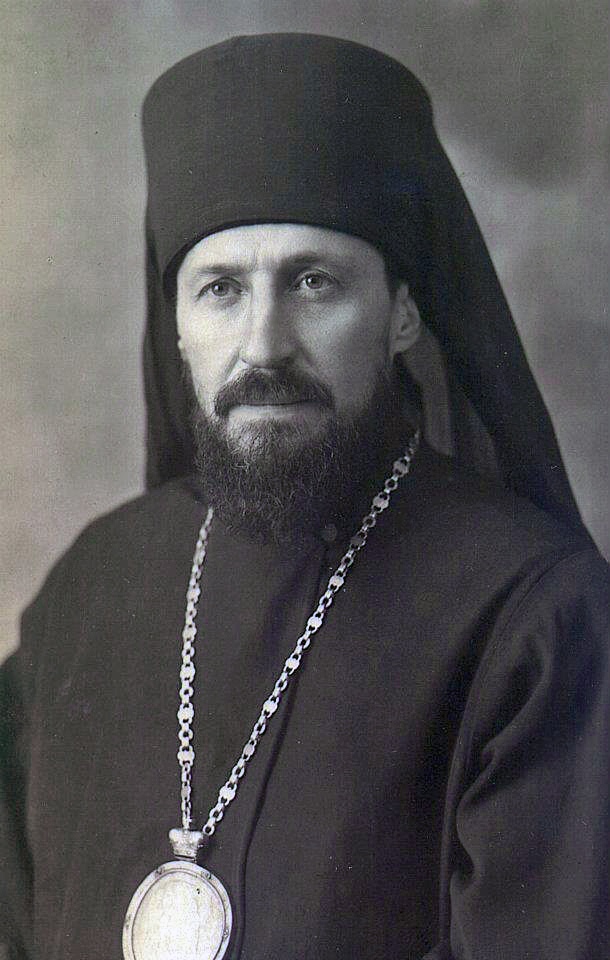

Johann von Gardner or in Russian Ivan Alekseevich Gardner Иван Алексеевич Гарднер (22 December 1898 – 26 February 1984) was a Russian-born Slavic musicologist, best known in the English language for his published work on Russian church singing.

Von Gardner was born into a family of Scottish ancestry on the family estate near Sevastopol, Crimea. He graduated in Orthodox Theology at the University of Belgrade, after that he worked for a while as teacher in the Seminary of Cetinje and later on he took monastic vows and was given the name Filipp. In 1931, he was ordained priest serving in the Eastern part of Slovakia, between 1934 and 1938 he was the head of the Russian Ecclesiastical Mission in Jerusalem. After his return he served a few years as parish priest in Berlin before he was consecrated bishop for the Russian Orthodox Church in Exile (ROCOR) in June 1942. On this occasion he was given the title "Bishop of Potsdam" thus being mainly responsible for the Russian Orthodox parishes of Berlin and Vienna. Yet in 1944 he had to leave holy orders and married shortly after - the exact circumstances how all this happened are not quite clear. After World War II he installed himself in the Bavarian spa town Bad Reichenhall situated not far from the Austrian border and became also choirmaster in one of the Russian Orthodox parishes of Salzburg which at that time were made up of refugees. In 1954, he was invited to LMU Munich as a lecturer of musicology hereby dealing especially with traditional Russian Chant, finally in 1965 he earned a doctorate and was subsequently given a professorship.

After 1917, he spent four years living in Subcarpathian Rus and was particularly amazed at the religious knowledge of the simple peasants, acquired simply by singing in church. He described the singing which he heard in the churches of the Carpathian regions: "In Subcarpathian Rus’ in all the villages both among the Uniates and also among the Orthodox, there was always practiced only congregational singing of the complete services.... The numerous chants ... were known by everyone, even the children of school age. The leader of song—the most experienced singer from the parish—standing at the kliros and sang the chant. As soon as the worshippers heard the beginning, they would join in the chant and the entire church sang; they sang all the stikhery, all the troparia, all the irmosy—in a word, everyone sang properly."

Johann von Gardner died on 26 February 1984 in Munich.

== Works ==
Russian Church Singing: Orthodox Worship and Hymnography, Vol. 1. Tr. Vladimir Morosan (St. Vladimir's Seminary Press, 1997), ISBN 978-0-913836-59-0.
