= Academic grading in Russia =

Academic grading in Russian Empire, Soviet Union, and Russia the most commonly used academic grading system comprises five points, four of which were and still are used most often. The 5 grade system in Russia was established in 1837 and used to this day.

The grades are as follows:

Grade	Summary	Description
5	"Excellent" (Russian: пять [ˈpʲætʲ], отлично [ɐtʲˈlʲitɕnɐ])	Denotes highest distinction and excellent knowledge of a subject when student knows subject by heart and doesn't make any or makes very minor mistakes
4	"Good" (Russian: четыре [tɕɪˈtɨrʲɪ], хорошо [xərɐˈʂo])	Denotes good knowledge of a subject but student makes some mistakes
3	"Satisfactory" (Russian: три [ˈtrʲi], удовлетворительно [ʊdəvlʲɪtvɐˈrʲitʲɪlʲnə])	Sometimes translated as "Fair", denotes a creditable or passing grade, student knows more than half material of subject, also student makes mistakes in his work
2	"Unsatisfactory" (Russian: два [ˈdva], неудовлетворительно, abbr. "неуд" [ˈnʲɛʊt])	Denotes limited knowledge of a subject, below average, level of failing, student makes many mistakes in his work
1	"Worst" (Russian: кол ['kol])	In the past, it was used to denote a complete lack of knowledge of a subject or even desire to learn one. Not used in practice, but may still be found in older grading documents.

In 1819 Russian empire has introduced 12-level military grades. They differed from those used in civil education adopted later.

The system of 5 grades with minor changes has been in use in Russian schools since 1837. Between 1917 and 1935, the Soviet government had tried to implement a radically new evaluation system with no grades at all but it was unable to put it into practice.

In the 1950s, there was an attempt was made to introduce + and – qualifiers to make some degree of differentiation between the grades (e.g. 4+ is better than 4 but not as good as 5–). Grading varied greatly from school to school, university to university and even teacher to teacher, and tended to be entirely subjective even for courses that lend themselves to objective marking such as mathematics and applied sciences. Even though the grades technically range from "1" to "5", "1" is not very common and is rarely given for academic reasons—in many cases a "1" is given as a result of failure to show up for an exam or to answer any questions. A "2" grade usually means that the student showed little or no knowledge in a subject.

In higher education, most subjects are graded ‘Pass/No pass’ ('Credit/No Credit') (зачёт/незачёт, pronounced "zachòt/nyezachòt"), and the rest are graded on the five-point scale. The 'Pass/No Pass' grades have no official numeric representation. When "zachòt"-type subjects are graded 'Pass/No pass' (sometimes translated as 'Credit/No credit'), this simply represents a student's good/poor knowledge of a subject. "Zachòt"-type subjects are also called "non-exams" due to lack of numerical representations. Each university applies its own standards of the level of knowledge required to pass each course. Students in Russia typically must pass all courses taken in order to graduate.

== Conversion to ECTS ==
According to MGIMO University the Russian grades have roughly the following correspondence with ECTS:

- 5 equates to A
- 4 equates to B (82–89%) or C (for 75–81% rating)
- 3 equates to D (67–74%) or E (for 60–66% rating)
- 2 equates to F

== References and external links ==
- Russian Ministry of Education and Science
- Russian education info
