= Monastery of St. Job of Pochaev, Ladomirová =

Monastery of St. Job of Pochaev in Ladomirová (Slovak: Monastier prepodobného Jova Počajevského v Ladomirovej, Russian: Монастырь преподобного Иова Почаевского в Ладомировой) was an Eastern Orthodox monastery that operated from 1923 to 1946 in the village of Ladomirová (now Svidník District, Slovakia). The monastery was formally under the jurisdiction of the Mukachevo-Prešov diocese of the Serbian Orthodox Church, but in fact the leadership was carried out by Vitaly (Maksimenko) of Russian Orthodox Church Outside of Russia. Many famous clergy and monks of the ROCOR lived in the monastery. The monastery, which had its own printing house, was known for its energetic and large-scale activities in publishing and distributing religious literature. The Brotherhood played an important role in spreading Orthodoxy in Slovakia.

On August 1, 1944, almost all the monks headed by its abbot Seraphim (Ivanov) left the monastery, fleeing from the advancing Red Army. Only three inhabitants remained in the monastery, headed by Sabbas (Struve). On November 15, 1944, units of the Red Army entered Ladomirová. The territory of the monastery was severely damaged by the air raid. Of the monastery buildings, only the Archangel Michael church has been preserved. The monastic community at the Archangel Michael church de jure ceased to exist in 1946. Although the Orthodox Church of the Czech Lands and Slovakia planned to reestablish the monastery, such a thing was never carried out. Nevertheless, Ladomirová still remains a place of Eastern Orthodox pilgrimage.

== Literature ==
- Лавр (Шкурла), архиеп. Воспоминания о переезде монашеской братии из Ладомировой в Джорданвилль в 1944-46 гг. // Православная Русь. — 1997. — № 7. — С. 6-8;
- Harbuľová, Ľubica (2000). Ladomirovské reminiscencie: z dejín ruskej pravoslávnej misie v Ladomirovej: 1923-1944 (in Slovak). Prešov: Pravoslávna bohoslovecká fakulta Prešovskej univerzity v Prešove.
- Sovič, Eliáš (2003). Pravoslávna cirkevná obec v Ladomirovej. Z dejín Pravoslávneho monastiera Prepodobného Jova Počajevského v Ladomirovej (in Slovak). Ladomirová: Pravoslávna cirkevná obec.
- Сборник материалов по истории Свято-Троицкой Семинарии: К пятидесятипятилетию Свято-Троицкой Семинарии: 1948—2003 гг (in Russian). Джорданвилль: Свято-Троицкий монастырь. 2003.
- Шкаровский, Михаил (2007). "Монастырь преподобного Иова Почаевского в Словакии". Диаспора: Новые материалы (in Russian). IХ. СПб; Париж: Athenaeum-Феникс: 296–321.
- Шкаровский, Михаил (2007). "Монастырь преп. Иова Почаевского". Новый журнал [New Review] (in Russian). 246. NYC: 267–288.
- Логвинов, Евфимий, иером. (2007). "О почаевской традиции в Русском Зарубежье" (PDF). XVII Ежегодная богословская конференция ПСТГУ: Материалы (in Russian). 1: 290–296.
- Marek, Pavel; Bureha, Volodymyr (2008). Pravoslavní v Československu v letech 1918—1953: Příspěvek k dějinám Pravoslavné církve v českých zemích, na Slovensku a na Podkarpatské Rusi (in Czech). Brno: Centrum pro studium demokracie a kultury. ISBN 978-80-7325-171-0.
- Колупаев, Владимир (2010). Православная книга Русского Зарубежья первой половины XX века: Из истории типографского братства Иова Почаевского, Волынь — Карпаты, 1903—1944. Монография (in Russian). Moscow: Издательство «Пашков дом». ISBN 978-5-7510-0432-3.
- Псарёв А. В. диак., В. В. Бурега Братства Преподобного Иова Почаевского и их роль в истории Русской Православной Церкви Заграницей // Труди Київської Духовної Академії. 2012. — № 16. — С. 278—293
- Бурега, Володимир (2015). "Чернеча спільнота святого Іова Почаївського в Ладомирово та її вплив на церковне життя російської еміграції у ХХ ст" (PDF). Наукові записки Богословсько-історичного науково-дослідного центру імені архімандрита Василія (Проніна) (in Ukrainian) (4). Ужгород: Всеукраїнське видавництво «Карпати»: 119–135.
- Derco, Marian (2016). "Krátko z histórie a súčasnosti pravoslávneho Monastiera Prepodobného Jóva Počajevského v Ladomirovej" (PDF). Pravoslávie a súčasnosť. Zborník príspevkov z VIII. vedeckej konferencie študentov, absolventov a mladých vedeckých pracovníkov Prešov (in Slovak): 78–83. ISBN 978-80-555-1671-4.
- Клементьев, Александр (2016). "Материалы к жизнеописанию Константина Петровича Струве (1900—1949), в монашестве Архимандрита Саввы, благочинного Типографского иноческого братства прп. Иова Почаевского в Ладомировой в Словакии (по письмам родным и друзьям)". Вестник Екатеринбургской духовной семинарии (in Russian). 13 (1): 45–121.
- Кашеваров, Анатолий (2018). "Издательская деятельность монашеского братства преподобного Иова Почаевского в 1923—1944 гг. в Словакии. К 95-летию основания". Христианское чтение (in Russian) (5): 225–236.
- Дерцо, Мариан, свящ. (2018). "Архимандрит Савва (Струве) в воспоминаниях Николая Гвозды". Вестник Екатеринбургской духовной семинарии (in Russian). 22 (2): 199–213. doi:10.24411/2224-5391-2018-10208.
- Шкаровский, Михаил (2020). "Русский монастырь преподобного Иова Почаевского в Словакии в годы Второй мировой войны" (PDF). Вестник церковной истории (in Russian). 57/58 (1/2): 183–224.
- Soroka, Peter (2023). Maják pravoslávia: 100 rokov od vzniku ladomirovského monastiera ako pokračovateľa pravoslávneho mníšstva na Slovensku: (1923—2023) (in Slovak). Osadné: Občianske združenie Krypta. ISBN 978-80-974611-0-2.
