= Congrua portio =

Congrua portio is a term in Catholic canon law, meaning the lowest sum proper for the yearly income of a cleric.

== History ==
It is sometimes used in the same sense as competency. Owing to the many charges to which a benefice is liable, it became necessary for the ecclesiastical authority to decree that first and foremost the proper sustenance of the holder of the benefice should be provided for, and that a minimum revenue should be determined, below which his income was not to fall. This was all the more necessary in cases where benefices had been incorporated with monasteries or collegiate churches. Very often the curate of such incorporated benefices received only one-sixteenth of the revenue.

To remedy this abuse a number of ordinances were passed which reserved to the person having cure of souls a decent subsistence. The Council of Trent (Sess. XXI, c. iv, de Ref.) leaves the determination of the congrua to the judgment of the bishop. This sum must, of course, vary with the fluctuation of values at different times. It must not be so parsimoniously fixed as to provide for the beneficiary the mere necessaries of life. To be a proper income in accordance with the dignity of his state, it should likewise be sufficient to enable him to dispense moderate hospitality and almsgiving and supply himself with books, etc. The Council of Trent did not determine the amount of the congrua but suggested that about one-third of the revenue of the benefice should be assigned to the vicar. When the benefice can not furnish a proper sustenance, it is the duty of the bishop to see that several benefices be united or that the deficit be made up from other sources, as tithes, collections, etc. If these means fail, the benefice must be suppressed.

In determining the congrua, the bishop can not take into consideration emoluments that are uncertain, such as offerings at funerals or marriages, or Mass Stipends; nor what the vicar might earn by his labour; nor what he receives from his patrimony; for these are not fruits of the benefice. When the congrua has been fixed for a certain benefice, it is always presumed to be sufficient, unless it be proved to have been lessened. Hence, if the beneficiary declare the congrua to be insufficient, especially when it has sufficed for his predecessors, the burden of proof rests on him.

If the congrua had been sufficient at the time a pension was reserved to another from the fruits of the benefice and later became insufficient, the amount necessary to provide proper sustenance must be taken from the pension, for those who have cure of souls are to be preferred to pensioners. Even a curate who is removable and a temporary vicar are to have a congrua assigned to them.

Although, in speaking of the congrua, authors generally limit the question to the inferior clergy, yet all rectors of churches, hence also bishops, are entitled to it. The Council of Trent (Sess. XXIV, cap. xiii) declared that a cathedral church whose revenue did not exceed one thousand scudi (about one thousand dollars circa 1900) should not be burdened with pensions or reservations. The bishop is entitled to an income that will allow him to live according to his dignity. If he have a coadjutor, the ordinary must provide a congrua for him.

In many European countries, where church property has passed into the possession of the State, the civil laws have determined the congrua of the clergy more or less liberally. Such laws came in force early in Austria and Germany, and until the end of 1905 existed in France. The salary for rectors of churches in the United States, fixed by plenary or diocesan synods, has nothing in common with the canonical congrua.
