= Greek Orthodox Archdiocese of Thyateira and Great Britain =

Greek Orthodox diocese covering the British Isles

Orthodox
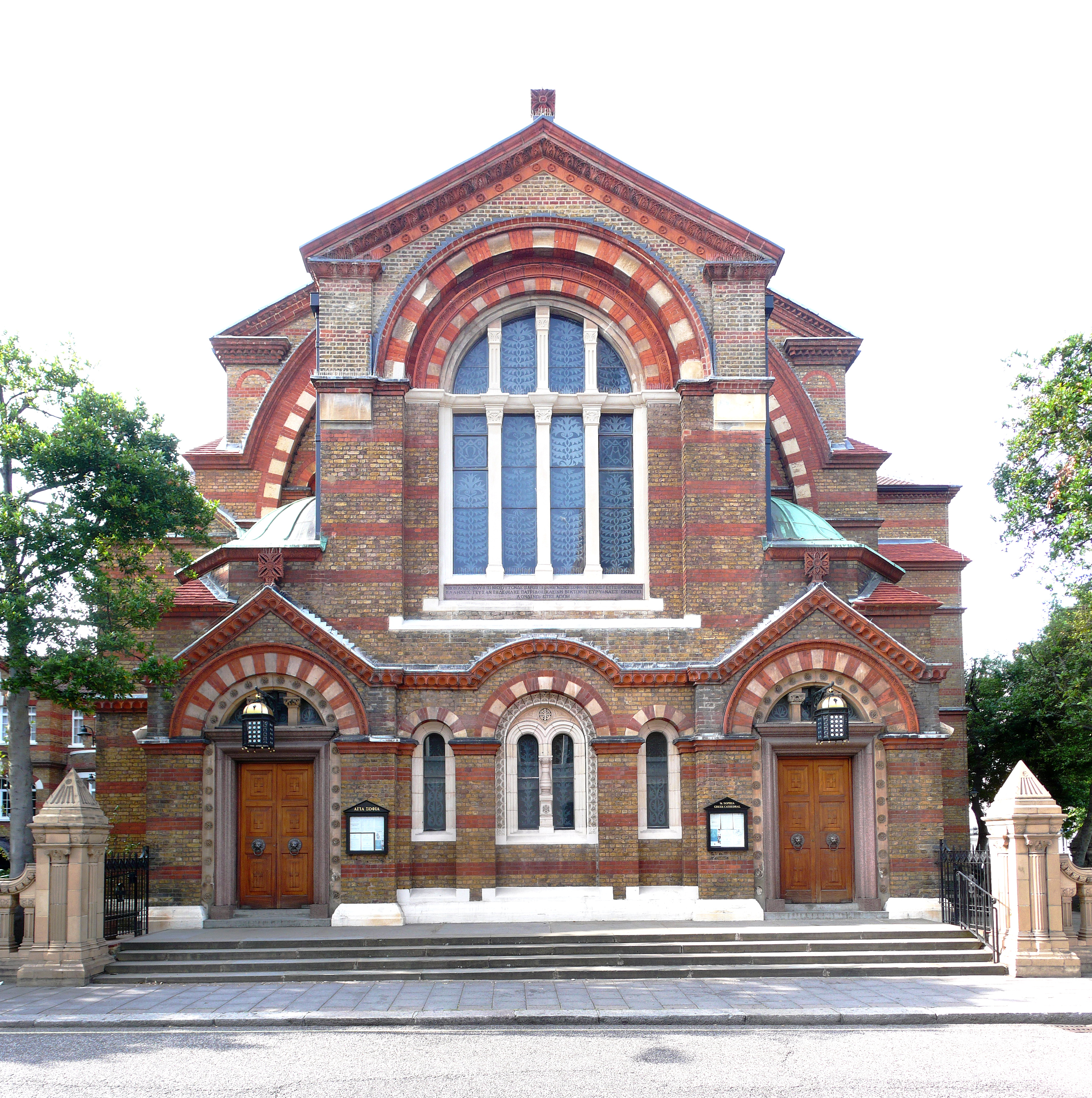
- Saint Sophia Cathedral, London

Location
- Country: United Kingdom
- Territory: British Isles; nominally Thyateira
- Headquarters: Thyateira House, London
- Coordinates: 51°30′47″N 0°10′49″W

Statistics
- Population: Total: Approximately 212,000
- Parishes: 114

Information
- Denomination: Eastern Orthodox
- Rite: Byzantine Rite
- Established: 1922
- Cathedral: Saint Sophia Cathedral, London
- Language: Greek, English

Current leadership
- Parent church: Ecumenical Patriarchate of Constantinople
- Governance: Episcopal
- Patriarch: Bartholomew I of Constantinople
- Archbishop: Nikitas (Loulias)
- Assistant bishops: Bishop Maximos of Melitene; Bishop Raphael of Ilion; Bishop Iakovos of Claudiopolis
- Vicar General: Archimandrite Theonas Bakalis

Website
- www.thyateira.org.uk

The Archdiocese of Thyateira and Great Britain is an archdiocese of the Ecumenical Patriarchate of Constantinople in the Eastern Orthodox Church. The incumbent archeparch is Archbishop Nikitas (Loulias). Its jurisdiction covers those Orthodox Christians living in the United Kingdom, the Isle of Man, and the Channel Islands. The adherents are largely of Cypriot Greek descent, mainland Greek migrants and their descendants, and more recently native British converts along with a few Poles, Belarusians, and Ukrainians. The episcopal seat is the Cathedral of Holy Wisdom (also known as Saint Sophia's) which is situated in London.

== Archdiocesan administration ==
The archdiocese is one of many metropolises of the Ecumenical Patriarchate. It was established as part of an expansion of Orthodox metropolises in Western Europe including Austria, Belgium, France, Germany, Italy, Sweden and Switzerland. The archbishop is considered the 'Primus inter pares' of the various Orthodox ecclesial bodies in the United Kingdom. The archbishop, therefore sits at the head of the Assembly of Canonical Orthodox Bishops of Great Britain and Ireland. The headquarters of the Archdiocese is at Thyateira House, in the Bayswater district of London.

== History ==
The first recorded organised Greek Orthodox community in England was established in 1670 by a group of 100 Greek refugees from Mani. There were also theologians, students, coffee shop owners, traders and sailors. Their priest was Daniel Boulgaris, who also seems to have taken the initiative to gain permission from the Anglican Bishop of London to build a permanent church for his growing flock. His efforts were boosted in 1676 by the arrival of the Archbishop of Samos, Joseph Georgerines, who had originally travelled to London to publish his Anthologion, "for the use of the Eastern Greek Church". Soon, the London authorities granted them permission to build a church. Georgerines then travelled around the country with his manservant, Dominikos Cratianas, to raise the necessary funds.

The church was inaugurated in 1677 in Soho and dedicated to the Panagia on what soon became Greek Street. However, the situation turned precarious when Dominicos Cratiana was taken to court by his master over the alleged disappearance of funds. Cratiana counteracted by accusing him of being a "Popish plotter".

The church was confiscated in 1684 and handed over to Huguenot refugees from France, much to the anger of the Greek archbishop, who wrote and circulated a furious pamphlet which criticised this move and detailed how the English authorities had expropriated the community. He wrote that the community "never sold the said Church, nor received any sum for the building thereof". The church no longer stands but the dedicatory plaque that was embedded over the main entrance is now housed in the narthex of the Greek Orthodox Cathedral of St Sophia in Bayswater.

During the next 150 years, the community had to worship in the Imperial Russian Embassy. Finally, in 1837, an autonomous community was set up in Finsbury Park in London. The first new church was built in 1850, on London Street in the City. In 1877, the Church of St Sophia (the Holy Wisdom) was constructed in London to cope with the growing influx of Orthodox immigrants to the United Kingdom. By the outbreak of the First World War, there were large Orthodox communities in London, Manchester, Cardiff and Liverpool, each focused on its own church.

=== Metropolis of Thyateira and Great Britain (1922–1968) ===
The issue of how these significant communities were to be governed was not resolved until 1922, when the Holy Synod of the Ecumenical Patriarchate, following the initiative of the Ecumenical Patriarch, Meletius IV, established a Metropolis to oversee both Central and Western Europe with its See in London, naming it ‘Metropolis of Thyateira and Great Britain’. The city of Thyateira, after which the Metropolis was named, was one of the seven Apostolic Churches mentioned in the Book of Revelation. The Ecumenical Patriarchate elected Metropolitan Germanos Strinopoulos as the first Hierarch of the newly-founded Metropolis. His long term in office (1922-1951) was marked by the founding of a large number of Greek Orthodox Communities both in Great Britain as well as in other countries in Western and Central Europe under the See of the Metropolis of Thyateira and Great Britain.

In 1951 the previous Metropolitan of Philadelphia, Athenagoras Kavvadas was elected Metropolitan of Thyateira and Great Britain. During his tenure he continued the pastoral and spiritual work of his predecessor, further contributing to the shaping of the historical, social and theological Greek-Orthodox presence in Great Britain and the rest of Western Europe.

On 10 December 1963, the then Metropolitan Athenagoras Kokkinakis was elected Metropolitan of Thyateira and Great Britain and on 24 February 1968, the Metropolis of Thyateira became the Archdiocese of Thyateira and Great Britain, specifically in charge of the British Isles. Under his term of office, the development of the archdiocese was impressive, despite the fact that the pastoral jurisdiction of the archdiocese was restricted due to the loss of the Scandinavian Eparchies and of Iceland, as a result of the establishment by the Ecumenical Patriarchate of the Metropolises of France, Germany and Austria.

=== Archdiocese of Thyateira and Great Britain (1968-present) ===
Archbishop Athenegoras embarked on a program of modernisation and the development of the archdiocese included a series of reforms concerning the relationship of the archdiocese to the other institutions of the Greek and Cypriot Diaspora in Great Britain, namely the organization of the educational projects of its Communities, the publication of journals (Orthodox Herald, the official pastoral publication), the election of new, efficient Bishops and the successful handling of the ‘deluge’ of refugees as a result of the invasion of the Turkish Army in Cyprus in 1974. Archbishop Athenagoras died on 9 September 1979, in London.

The Holy Synod of the Ecumenical Patriarchate then appointed the previous Metropolitan of Axum (Ethiopia) under the Alexandrian Church, Methodios Fouiyas, to the archdiocese in 1979. He had moved from the Alexandrian Church to the Ecumenical Patriarchate in order to do so. He continued the project of Archbishop Athenagoras until he was revoked by the Ecumenical Patriarchate in April 1988 and was given the title of Metropolitan of Pisidia. He died in Athens in 2006.

In April 1988, the Ecumenical Patriarchate elected Bishop of Tropaiou, Gregorios (Theocharous), as the new archbishop. Being well-informed in the affairs and realities of the Greek-Orthodox Diaspora due to his former service in Great Britain as deacon, priest, Archmandrite and Bishop, and armed with an enviable zeal for reform, the new archbishop drastically transformed the archdiocese, the communities and its schools. He served a lengthy tensure as archbishop, holding the throne for thirty-one years. For reasons of prolonged age and fragile health, Archbishop Gregorios resigned and Nikitas (Loulias) was elected Archbishop of Thyateira and Great Britain by the Holy Synod of the Ecumenical Patriarchate, following the recommendation of Ecumenical Patriarch Bartholomew I. His enthronement took place in the Cathedral of the Divine Wisdom in London on 27 July 2019.

== Archbishops of Thyateira and Great Britain ==
Several archbishops have served the Metropolis/Archdiocese since 1922 including:

- Germanos (Strinopoulos) (1922–1951)
- Athenagoras (Kavadas) (1951–1962)
- Athenagoras (Kokkinakis) (1963–1979)
- Methodios (Fouiyas) (1979–1988)
- Gregorios (Theocharous) (1988–2019)
- Nikitas (Loulias) (2019–present)

== Parishes and monasteries ==
As of 2021 there are 114 parishes and monasteries in the UK and Ireland:

=== Southwest ===
- SS Michael the Archangel & Piran, near Falmouth
- SS Demetrius & Nicetas, Plymouth
- St Andrew, Torquay
- St Andrew the Apostle, Weston-super-Mare
- SS Peter & Paul, Bristol
- Nativity of the Mother of God (Eastern Orthodox Church), Bristol
- St John of Kronstadt, Bath
- Community of St John Chrysostom, Gloucester
- St John the Forerunner, Salisbury
- Community of St Spyridon, Bournemouth
- Holy Prophet Elias, Exeter & Combe Martin

=== Southeast ===
- Holy Trinity & Annunciation, Oxford
- SS Ambrose & Stylianos, Milton Keynes
- Community of St Phanourius, Aylesbury
- Community of St Gregory the Theologian, Beaconsfield
- Prophet Elias, Reading
- St Andrew the Apostle, Windsor
- St Nicholas, Southampton
- Community of Portsmouth
- Holy Trinity, Brighton
- St Mary Magdalene, St Leonards-on-Sea
- SS Panteleimon & Theodore, Eastbourne
- Annunciation of the Mother of God, Maidstone
- SS Mark & Fotini, Folkestone
- Archangel Michael, Margate

=== London ===
==== Central London ====
- Cathedral & Metropolitical Church of St Sophia, Bayswater
- Cathedral of St Andrew, Kentish Town
- Cathedral of All Saints, Camden Town
- Archdiocesan Chapel of the Annunciation of the Mother of God, Bayswater

==== North London ====
- Cathedral of the Dormition of the Mother of God, Wood Green
- Cathedral of the Holy Cross & St Michael, Golders Green
- SS Cosmas & Damian, NW5 1LN
- SS Anthony the Great & John the Baptist, Islington
- St Barnabas, Wood Green
- St Demetrius, Lower Edmonton, N9 0LP
- St John the Baptist, Hornsey
- St Katherine, Friern Barnet
- SS Panteleimon & Paraskevi, Harrow
- Community of SS Raphael, Nicholas & Irene of Lesbos (Mytiline), Enfield North & District
- Chapel of the Resurrection, Muswell Hill

==== South London ====
- Cathedral of the Nativity of the Mother of God, Camberwell
- SS Constantine & Helen, Upper Norwood
- St Nectarius, SW11 5QR
- St George, Kingston-upon-Thames
- Christ the Saviour, Welling

==== East London ====
- SS Eleutherius, Anthia & Luke the Evangelist, Leyton
- St John the Theologian, E8 3RD
- SS Lazarus & Andrew the Apostle, Forest Gate

==== West London ====
- Cathedral of St Nicholas, Shepherds Bush

=== East of England ===
- St Mamas, Bedford
- St Charalambos, Luton
- The Twelve Apostles, Brookmans Park
- SS Athanasius & Clement, Cambridge
- Mother of God, Norwich
- Pan-Orthodox Chapel of Life-Receiving Source, Walsingham
- St Spyridon, Great Yarmouth
- Community of SS Cosmas & Damian, Ipswich
- Community of St Sophia & Her Three Daughters, Bishop's Stortford
- Patriarchal Stavropegic Monastery of St. John the Baptist, Essex
- SS Barbara, Phanourius & Paul, Southend-on-Sea

=== West Midlands ===
- Community of SS Stephen & Thecla, Hereford
- Community of Oswestry
- Holy Fathers of Nicaea & St John the Baptist, Shrewsbury
- Community of the Holy Fathers of Nicaea, Telford
- Cathedral of the Dormition of the Mother of God & St Andrew, Birmingham
- Holy Trinity & St Luke, Birmingham
- Nativity of the Mother of God, Walsall
- The Holy Transfiguration, Coventry
- Ascension of the Lord, Rugby
- SS Mary & Marina, Stoke-on-Trent

=== East Midlands ===
- St Neophytos, Northampton
- SS Nicholas & Xenophon, Leicester
- Virgin Mary Eleousa, Nottingham
- SS Aidan and Chad, Nottingham
- SS Cyril & Methodius, Mansfield
- St Basil the Great & Saint Paisios, Lincoln

=== Northwest ===
- St Barbara, Chester
- St Nicholas, Toxteth
- Annunciation of the Mother of God, Manchester
- St Nicholas, Blackley
- Community of the Holy Apostles, Leyland
- Community of St Simon the Zealot, Dalton-in-Furness
- Community of St Bega, St Mungo, & St Herbert, Braithwaite

=== Yorkshire and the Humber ===
- Annunciation of the Mother of God, Sheffield
- Three Hierarchs, Leeds
- Community of St Constantine the Great, York

=== Northeast ===
- Annunciation of the Mother of God, Middlesbrough
- Community of SS Cuthbert & Bede, Durham
- St Anthony, Newcastle-upon-Tyne

=== Wales ===
- St Nicholas, Cardiff
- Three Hierarchs, Lampeter
- Community of Rhuddlan

=== Scotland ===
- Cathedral of St Luke, Glasgow
- Chapel of St Andrew, Edinburgh
- Chapel of St John the Baptist, Ardross Castle
- Community of Dundee
- Community of St Andrews
- Community of Perth
- Oratory of the Mother of God & St Cumein, Fort Augustus
- The Highland Orthodox Community of St Columba, Inverness
- Community of St Matthew the Apostle, Aberdeen
- Saint Kessog's Orthodox Church, Falkirk

=== Channel Islands ===
- Community of SS Simon, Andrew the Apostle & Philon, Jersey
- Community of All Saints, Guernsey

See also Category:Greek Orthodox church buildings in the United Kingdom

== See also ==
- Assembly of Canonical Orthodox Bishops of Great Britain and Ireland

== Bibliography ==
- Kiminas, Demetrius (2009). The Ecumenical Patriarchate: A History of Its Metropolitanates with Annotated Hierarch Catalogs. Wildside Press LLC. ISBN 9781434458766.
