= Gregorios Theocharous =

Former Greek Orthodox Archbishop

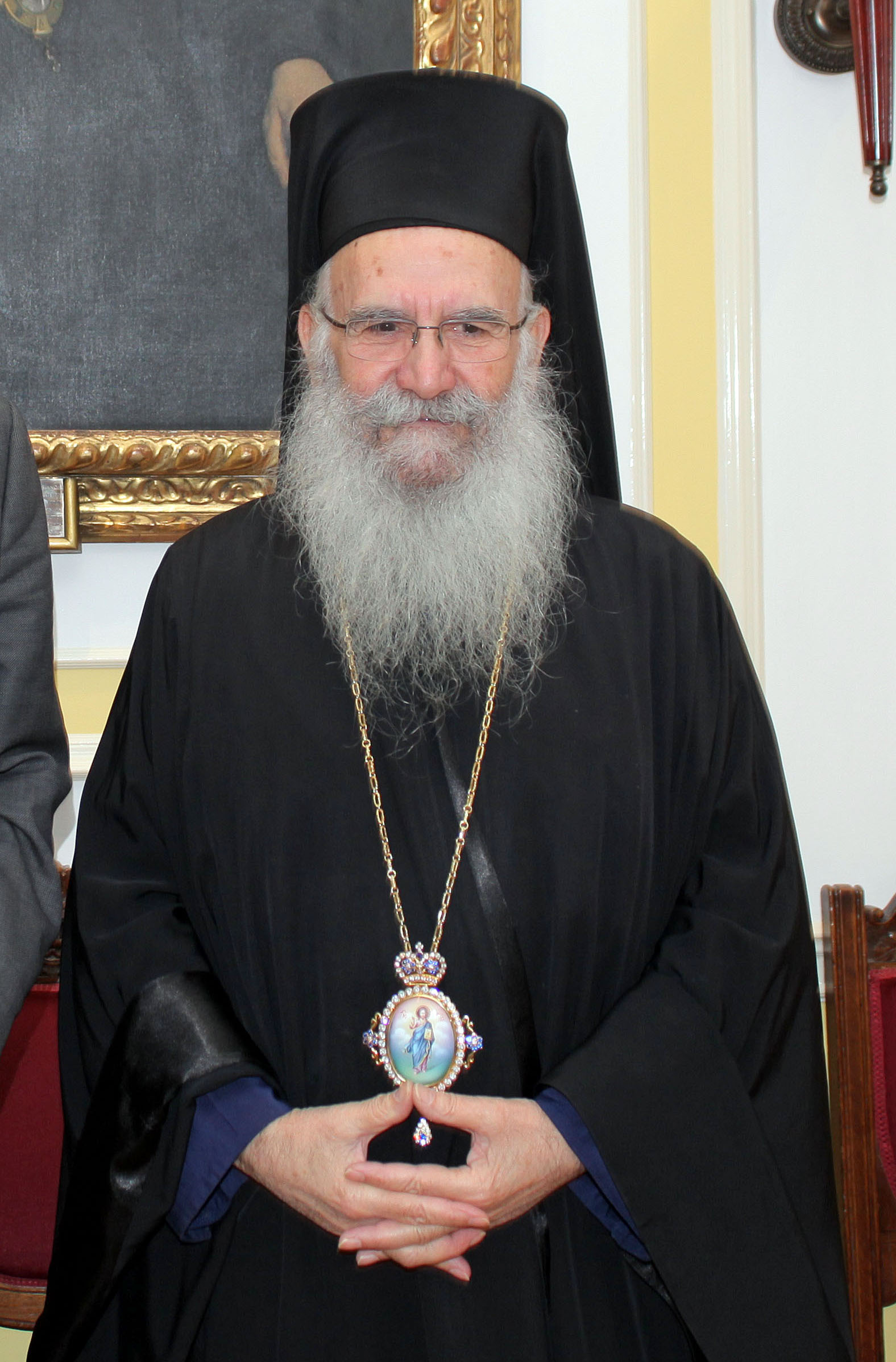
His Eminence Archbishop Gregorios of Thyateira and Great Britain.

Gregorios Theocharous of Thyateira and Great Britain (Greek: Γρηγόριος Θεοχάρους; 28 October 1928 – 20 November 2019) served as the Greek Orthodox Archbishop of Thyateira and Great Britain under the Ecumenical Patriarchate of Constantinople. He was elected Archbishop by the Sacred and Holy Synod of the Ecumenical Patriarchate on 16 April 1988. He resigned on 12 June 2019 for health reasons and was succeeded by Nikitas Loulias. He died on 20 November 2019. His funeral took place on 5 December 2019 at St Mary's Greek Orthodox Church, Wood Green.

== Early life ==
Gregorios was born in the Cypriot village of Marathovounos in the Famagusta District on 28 October 1928. He was the ninth and last child of the builder Theocharis and his wife Maria Hadjitofi. At the age of three, his father died and so he was brought up by his mother and eight older siblings. He recalled in an interview with Hellenic TV in the UK that his father wanted to call him Varanava (Barabbas) (Greek; Βαράββα) however, later decided to call him Gregorios after his brother who died in Asia-Minor. On his 13th birthday (October 28, 1941) he heard on the only radio of the village that Greece had joined the war by refusing to allow Axis troops to enter its territory. His mother died in 1961, one year after Cyprus gained independence from Britain.

== In Famagusta & Education ==
He went to Varosha, Famagusta aged 18 and he worked as a shoemaker in his brother-in-law's shop. At the age of 20, he decided to attend a secondary school; he enrolled in 1949 at the Higher Commercial School of the town of Lefkoniko which, at that time, had only five classes. He was accepted into the second-year class. In 1951, he transferred to the Pancyprian Gymnasium in Nicosia. He graduated from the Pancyprian Gymnasium in 1954 and went to Athens to study at the Theological School.

== Clerical career ==
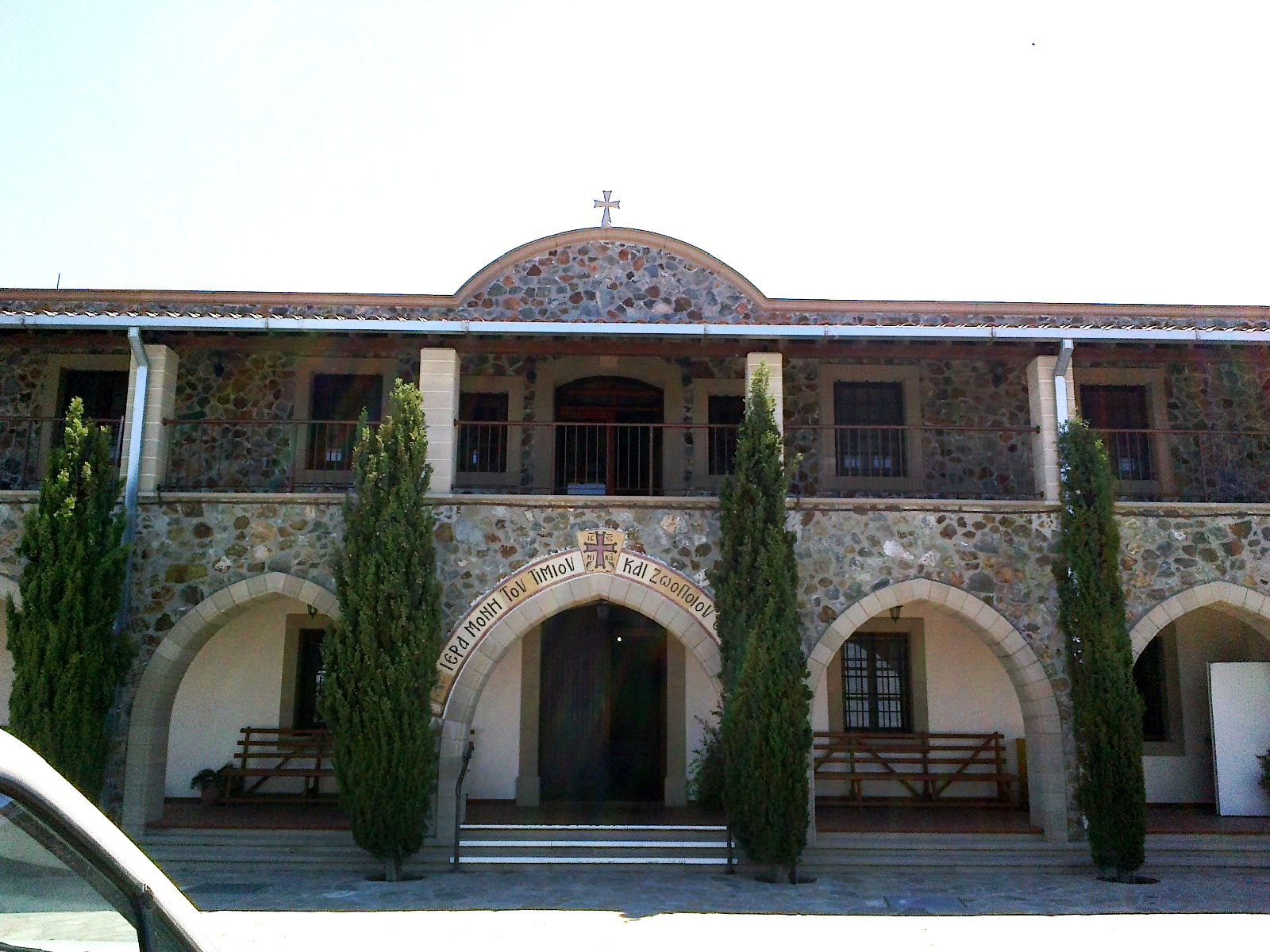
The courtyard of Stavrovouni Monastery in Cyprus where Archbishop Gregorios entered the monastic life

In 1951, he became a monk at Stavrovouni Monastery whilst studying at the Pancyprian Gymnasium in Nicosia. In 1953, he was ordained a deacon on Sunday of the Pentecost at the Church of Ayios Savvas, Nicosia (St. Savva) by the late Archbishop Makarios III.

=== In London ===
He arrived in London in April 1959 and was appointed to the Greek Orthodox Church of All Saints Cathedral, Camden Town. He was ordained presbyter by the late Archbishop of Thyateira, Athenagoras Kavada (Archbishop 1951–1963), on 26 April of the same year. In 1964 he was appointed Chancellor of the Archdiocese of Thyateira.

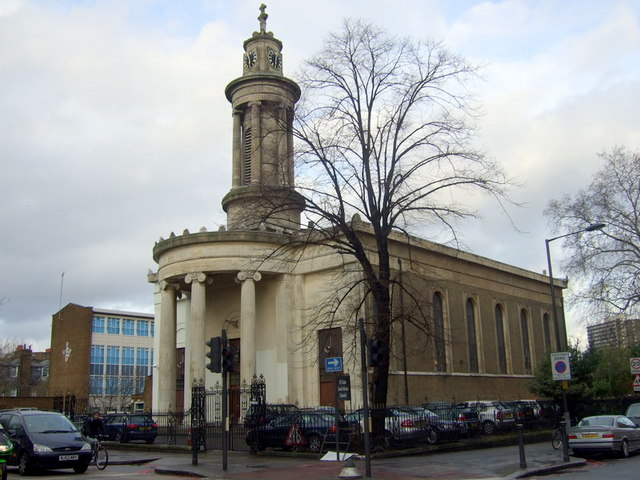
All Saints Cathedral Camden Town, where Gregorios first served whilst he was a priest in London and where he was ordained Bishop of Troaeon

He stated during his life that he never even thought that he would become a bishop, he said that one lady at church once said to him that the Archbishop of Thyateira and Great Britain Athenagoras Kokkinakis (Archbishop 1963–1979), wanted to make him bishop which later became a reality in 1970. On 12 December 1970, he was elected by the Sacred and Holy Synod of the Ecumenical Patriarchate as the titular Bishop of Tropaeon, Auxiliary Bishop of the Archdiocese of Thyateira and Great Britain. He was ordained by Archbishop of Thyateira Athenagoras Kokkinakis on Palm Sunday (11 April 1971) at All Saints Cathedral, Camden Town

== Election and Enthronement as Archbishop ==
On 16 April 1988 he was unanimously elected by the Sacred and Holy Synod of the Ecumenical Patriarchate as Archbishop of Thyateira and Great Britain and his enthronement took place at Saint Sophia Cathedral in London. He served the Greek Orthodox community of Great Britain for 31 years.

Eastern Orthodox Church titles
Preceded by Methodios (Fouyias)	Archbishop of Thyateira and Great Britain; 1988 – 2019	Succeeded by Nikitas (Loulias)
