= Ascension Greek Orthodox Cathedral of Oakland =

Coordinates: 37.809578°N 122.20115°W

- Greek Orthodox Cathedral of the Ascension
- Ascension Greek Orthodox Cathedral of Oakland
- Location: Oakland, California
- Country: United States of America
- Denomination: Greek Orthodoxy
- Website: ascensioncathedral.com

Administration
- Metropolis: Greek Orthodox Metropolis of San Francisco
- Archdiocese: Greek Orthodox Archdiocese of America

Clergy
- Archbishop: Archbishop Elpidophoros of America
- Bishop: Gerasimos Michaleas

The Ascension Greek Orthodox Cathedral is an Eastern Orthodox cathedral church in Oakland, California. It is located at 4700 Lincoln Avenue.

== History ==
The original community, formed in 1917, worshiped in a rented hall until it built the first Greek Orthodox church in the East Bay. The Assumption Greek Orthodox Church (in Greek, Κοίμησις τῆς Θεοτόκου), opened on May 21, 1921, on Brush Street in Downtown Oakland. By 1960, the community, having outgrown its facilities, relocated to the present site in the Oakland hills and was re-dedicated to the Analypsis (the Ascension of Our Savior), on December 11, 1960.

The church was elevated to the status of a cathedral in February 1992. The Greek Orthodox Cathedral of the Ascension has evolved from a predominantly immigrant society into one that now spans six generations, with over 1,200 parishioners, making it the largest Greek Orthodox community in the Greek Orthodox Metropolis of San Francisco.

== Icons and events ==
The cathedral has a distinctive collection of Orthodox iconography. The icon of Jesus the Pantocrator (or Almighty) is the largest Orthodox icon of Jesus in the Americas. Reverend Father Thomas J. Paris served as Ascension's pastor from 1971 until his retirement nearly four decades later. Reverend Father Tom Zaferes is now the pastor and dean of the cathedral. A new chapel, dedicated to the Assumption of the Virgin Mary, is currently being constructed on the church grounds.

The cathedral hosts an annual Greek food and culture festival, traditionally held the weekend after Mother's Day, on the church grounds. One of the largest festivals of its kind in the United States, the Oakland Greek Festival offers a wide variety of Greek foods, cultural exhibitions, Greek dancing, and live music.
