= Greek Orthodox Church of the Holy Trinity and St Luke =

Coordinates: 52°30′53″N 1°52′00″W

St Luke's Church, Birmingham
- Greek Orthodox Church of Saint Luke and The Holy Trinity
- The entrance of the church

- Shown within West Midlands
- Location: Park Approach, Erdington, Birmingham, B23 7SJ, United Kingdom, West Midlands
- Country: England
- Denomination: Greek Orthodox
- Tradition: Greek Orthodox
- Website: orthodoxchurch stlukebham.org.uk

History
- Consecrated: 22 October 1995

Administration
- Diocese: Archdiocese of Thyateira and Great Britain

Icon of the Mother of God on the ceiling in the Holy of Holies

The Church of The Holy Trinity and St Luke is a Greek Orthodox church in Erdington, Birmingham, England, dedicated to The Holy Trinity and St Luke. In Greek: "Ελληνορθόδοξη Εκκλησία Της Αγίας Τριάδος και Αποστόλου Λουκά". The church celebrates the Feast Day of St. Luke on 18 October.

== History ==
The Church of the Holy Trinity and St Luke the Evangelist was founded in 1983. Until December 1994 services were held at an Anglican church in Sutton Coldfield (near Birmingham). In 1992 it was decided to relocate the Church to the West Midlands Cypriot Community Centre in Erdington, Birmingham.

This was done with the help of the Church Council and the priest at the time, Fr Nikolaos Skapoulis, and the support and blessing of Archbishop Gregorios of Thyateira and Great Britain. On 22 October 1995 Gregorios consecrated the new Church. Since then the Divine Liturgy was celebrated there on Sundays and main feast days. As of 2013 the priest of the church was Fr Christos Stephanou.

In 2007 a renovation programme started in 2007 in which the roof was restored, a new ceiling installed, and frescoes painted on the walls depicting various biblical scenes in a Byzantine style.

== Youth conference ==
The Church held an Orthodox Youth Conference on 26 January 2008, with a divine liturgy followed by talks by several speakers, ending with a Vespers service.

== See also ==
- Birmingham Orthodox Cathedral (Archdiocese of Thyateira and Great Britain)
