= Greek Orthodox Cathedral of St Andrew the Apostle =

Greek Orthodox church in England

Cathedral of St. Andrew
- Greek Orthodox Cathedral of St. Andrew the Apostle
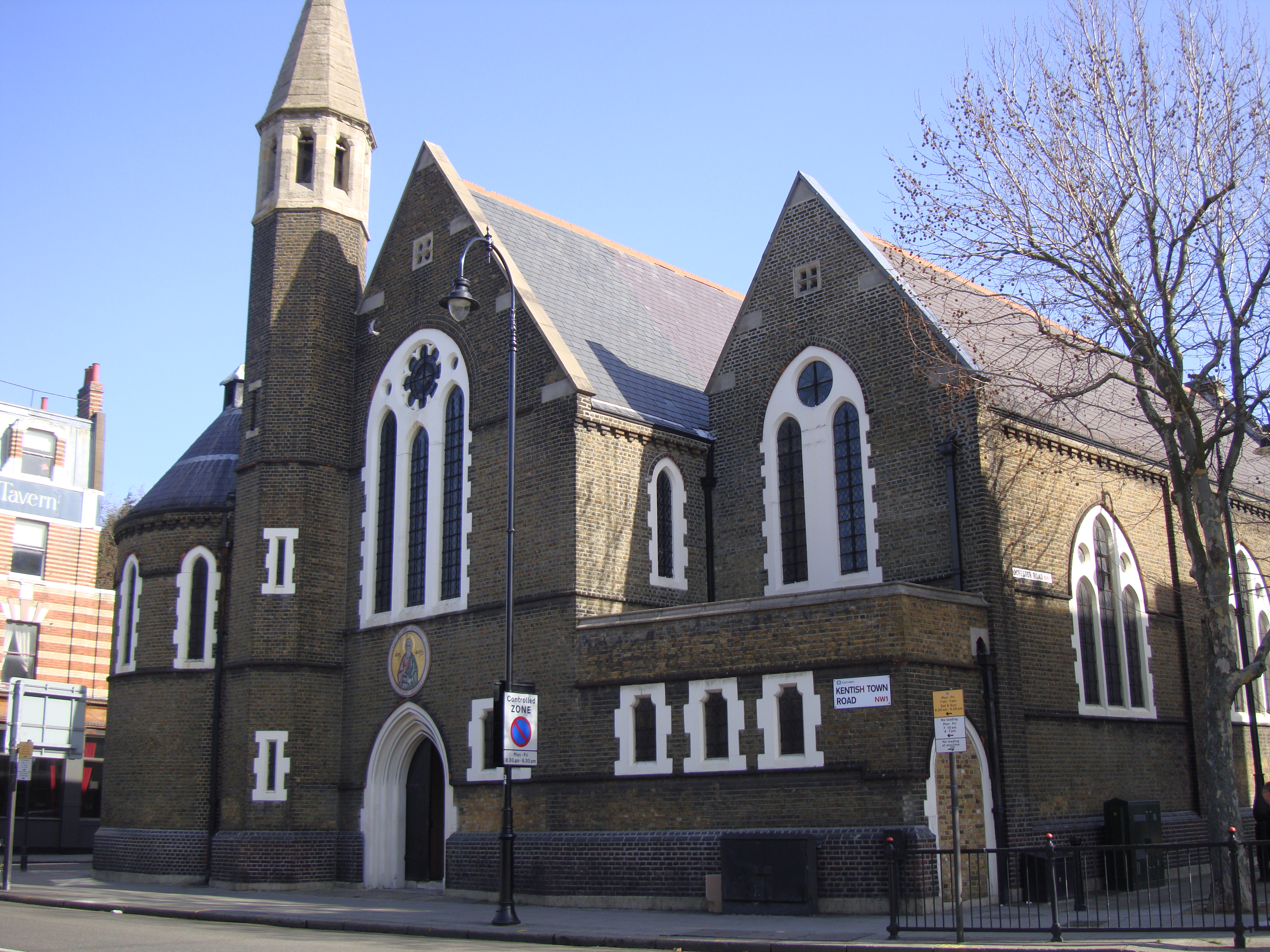
- Cathedral of St. Andrew
- 51.5456°N 0.1413°W
- Location: London
- Country: England
- Denomination: Greek Orthodox

Architecture
- Heritage designation: Grade II
- Designated: 11 January 1999
- Architect: Ewan Christian

Administration
- Diocese: Archdiocese of Thyateira and Great Britain

Clergy
- Archbishop: Nikitas
- Priest: Œconomos Kristian Akselberg

The Cathedral of St Andrew the Apostle is a Greek Orthodox Cathedral under the Ecumenical Patriarch of Constantinople in Kentish Town, London. The Cathedral belongs to the Greek Orthodox Archdiocese of Thyateira and Great Britain, headed by Archbishop Nikitas Loulias.

== History ==
The cathedral was built between 1884–85 to a design by Ewan Christian as a church for the Ecclesiastical Commissioners, originally dedicated to Saint Barnabas the Apostle. In 1957, the cathedral began to be used by the Greek Orthodox Church and later became the Greek Orthodox Cathedral of Saint Andrew the Apostle, after it was purchased with help from the Papathomas family of Cyprus.

The building is a Grade II listed building.

== Liturgy ==
On Sunday mornings, Matins and Divine Liturgy is held from 8:30am until 12:00pm. Weekly, on Saturday, a Vespers Service is held from 5pm until 6pm. One Saturday per month, the Divine Liturgy is said in English.
