= Birmingham Cathedral =

Birmingham Cathedral may refer to:

== Birmingham, England ==
- St Philip's Cathedral, Birmingham (Church of England)
- St Chad's Cathedral, Birmingham (Catholic)
- Birmingham Orthodox Cathedral (Greek Orthodox)

== Birmingham, Alabama, United States ==
- Cathedral Church of the Advent (Birmingham, Alabama) (Episcopalian)
- Cathedral of Saint Paul (Birmingham, Alabama) (Catholic)
- Holy Trinity - Holy Cross Cathedral in Birmingham, Alabama (Greek Orthodox)
