= Nektarios Tsilis =

Metropolitan in the Orthodox Metropolitanate of Hong Kong and Southeast Asia

Metropolitan Nektarios Tsilis (Greek: Μητροπολίτης Νεκτάριος Τσίλης; born 1969, Dodoni, Ioannina, Greece) is the Metropolitan of the Eastern Orthodox Metropolis of Hong Kong and Southeast Asia.

== Biographical timeline ==
He graduated from the Higher Ecclesiastical School of Athens (Ανωτέρα Εκκλησιαστική Σχολή Αθηνών), and the Theological School of the University of Athens.

In 1990 he was ordained deacon and after that he served in parishes of the Metropolis of Piraeus: the Annunciation of the Theotokos, the Holy Unmercenaries and St Sophia.

In 1995 he ordained to priesthood and served as preacher of the Metropolis, Rector of the parish of the Life-Giving Fountain, Secretary of the Metropolis' Youth Organisation, President of the committee of the Church of Hatzikyriakou Orphanage, director of the radio program "Peiraiki Ekklisia 91.2FM" and deputy manager of the magazine "Peiraiki Ekklisia" until 2001.

Since 2001 he served as the Vicar of the Metropolis of Samos and Ikaria, member of the Spiritual Court, rector of the Cathedral of St Nicholas, Samos, chairman of the board of Panagia Spyliani and Abbot of Panagia Vrodiani Monastery. At that time he represented the Metropolises of Piraeus and Samos in youth conferences, seminars on cults and new religious movements and issues concerning Europe's stance on religion. Regularly contributed to many magazines and periodicals.

January 9, 2008 the Holy Synod of the Church of Constantinople unanimously elected him to be the new Metropolitan of Hong Kong and Southeast Asia.

January 20, 2008 Archimandrite Nektarios consecrated to the episcopacy at the Phanar at the Patriarchal Church of St George.

March 1, 2008 Metropolitan Nektarios was enthroned at the Canossian Catholic Chapel at 34–36 Caine Road, Hong Kong, by Metropolitan Athenagoras (Aneste) of Mexico and Central America. Other Christian Churches at the service represented by: Cardinal Joseph Zen Ze-kiun of Hong Kong Catholic diocese, Anglican primate of Hong Kong Sheng Kung Hui Archbishop Paul Kwong and Methodist Reverend Ralph Lee Ting-sun, secretary general of the Hong Kong Christian Council.

== Bibliography ==
- Deacon Georgiy Maksimov A Russian response to an exclusively Hellenic South East Asia

Eastern Orthodox Church titles
Preceded by Nikitas (Lulias)	Metropolitan of Hong Kong and Southeast Asia; 2008 – present	Succeeded by incumbent
