= Patriarch Athenagoras Orthodox Institute =

Eastern Orthodox theological institution In Berkeley, United States

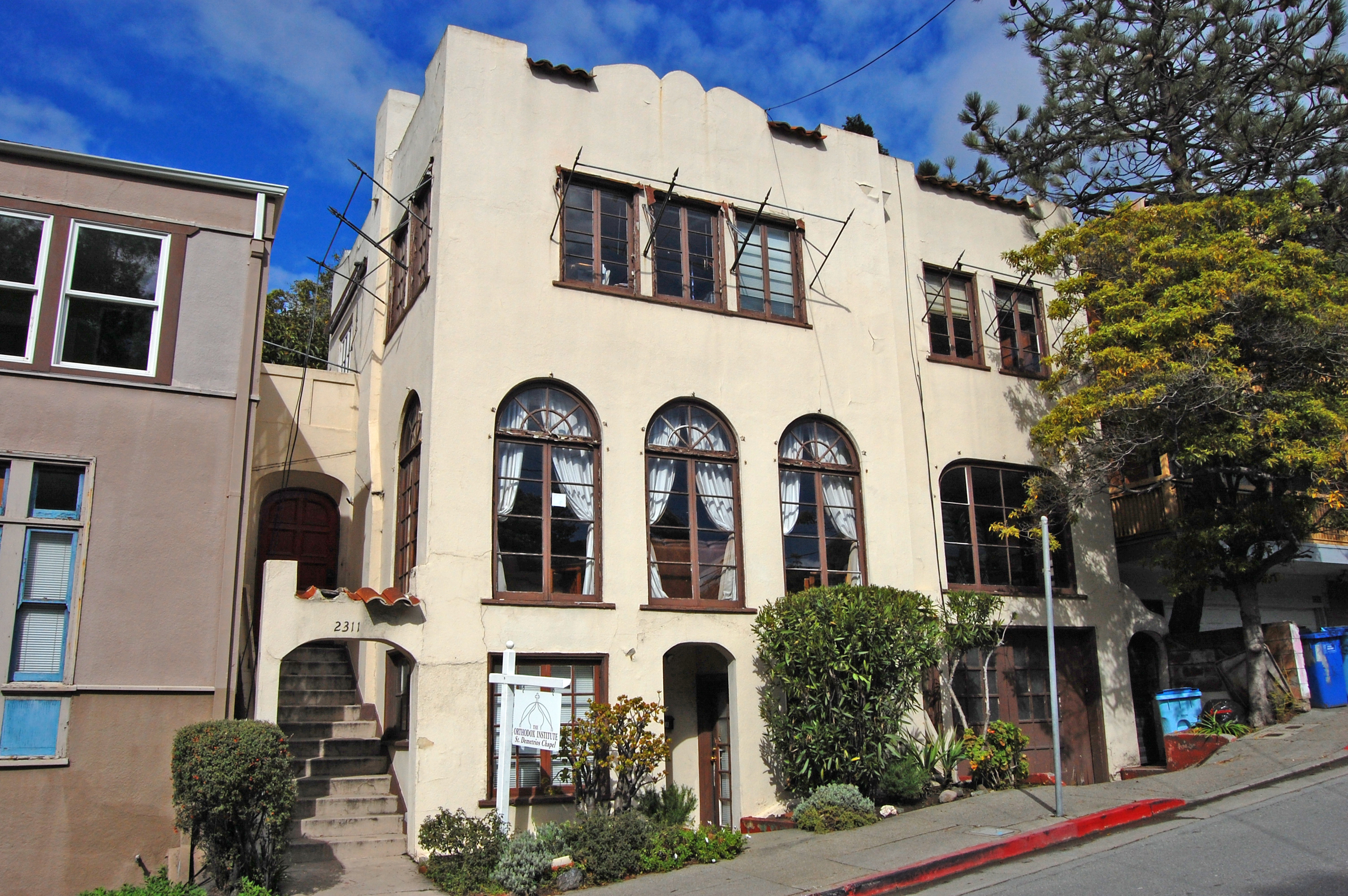
- Type: Seminary
- Affiliations: Ecumenical Patriarchate of Constantinople
- Location: Berkeley, California, United States
- Website: www.orthodoxinstitute.org

The Patriarch Athenagoras Orthodox Institute (PAOI) is a member of the Graduate Theological Union, an ecumenical and interfaith consortium of nine independent seminaries and ten affiliated centers based in Berkeley, California. The institute is a unique, independent, not-for-profit teaching and research institution. The PAOI exists to educate, communicate, promote and sustain the traditions, values, teachings and culture of Eastern Orthodox Christianity. It is the only independent and permanently endowed Orthodox educational center with a physical presence at a North American university.

The organization has EIN 94-2736765 as a 501(c)(3) Public Charity; in 2025 it claimed $147,027 in total revenue and $597,453 in total assets.

The PAOI is chartered by the Ecumenical Patriarchate of Constantinople in modern-day Istanbul, Turkey, and is named in honor of Patriarch Athenagoras I of Constantinople, the Ecumenical Patriarch of Constantinople from 1948 to 1972.

== Academics ==
The PAOI offers the Master of Arts in Eastern Orthodox Christian Studies as a two-year degree program. It is the only MA program in Orthodox theology in North America outside of those offered by the Orthodox seminaries in the Eastern United States.

== Programs ==
The Paul Manolis Distinguished Lecturer Series brings prominent Orthodox scholars from throughout the world. Previous lecturers include Metropolitan Kallistos Ware and former vice-rector of the Pontifical Oriental Institute in Rome, Fr. Robert Taft.

The institute's Campus Ministry assists with the social and spiritual needs of Orthodox Christian students, and is a sponsor of the Cal Berkeley chapter of the Orthodox Christian Fellowship.

The InterOrthodox Press is the publishing arm of the institute; it makes available for purchase books and other materials reflecting the work of the Institute as well as works written by scholars on topics of concern to the Orthodox Church.

== Community Outreach ==
The Institute regularly offers educational programs to the faithful of the San Francisco Bay Area and beyond. These range from courses in Byzantine Chant, seminars and workshops, to the annual Summer Institute.

The institute has been active with local history groups, working to collect, preserve, and share the history of the Greek-American community in the United States.

== Personnel ==
Metropolitan Tarasios (Antonopoulos) was the most recent director of the Institute .

== History ==
The institute was incorporated as an Affiliate Member of the Graduate Theological Union in Berkeley, California in 1981, under the leadership of (then) Bishop Anthony (Gergiannakis) of San Francisco and The Very Reverend Dr. Leonidas Contos. In 1987 the Alexander G. Spanos Chair of Eastern Orthodox Christian Studies was established through a generous donation by Alexander and Faye Spanos.

=== Previous Directors ===
- 2002–2006, Dr. Anton C. Vrame. Dr. Vrame holds degrees from DePaul University and University of Chicago, [Holy Cross School of Orthodox Theology hchc.edu] (Masters of Divinity, 1989) and Boston College (Ph.D. in Theology and Education, 1997.) Prior to being named the director of the PAOI, Dr. Vrame was the managing editor of Holy Cross Orthodox Press, the publishing arm of Holy Cross School of Orthodox Theology, Brookline, Massachusetts, from 1996 to 2002. Previous positions were adjunct Assistant professor in Christian Education at Holy Cross and Lecturer in Religious Education at St. Vladimir's Orthodox Theological Seminary. He was named the Director of the Department of Religious Education of the Greek Orthodox Archdiocese of America effective January 1, 2007.
- 1981–2001, Paul G. Manolis. Mr. Manolis was the founding director of the St. John the Divine Orthodox Institute that later was named the Patriarch Athenagoras Orthodox Institute.
