= Church of St Basil and St Paisios, Lincoln =

Church of St. Basil and St. Paisios, Lincoln
- Greek Orthodox Church of St Basil and St Paisios in Lincoln
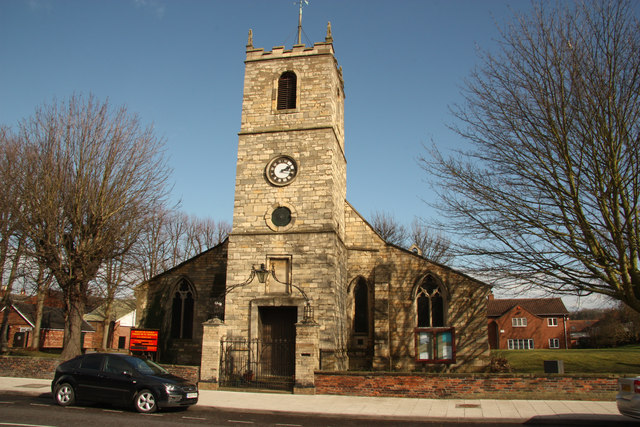
- St Basil and St Paisios Church, Lincoln (Formerly St Botolph's Church)
- Church of St. Basil and St. Paisios, Lincoln
- 53.2165°N 0.5450°W
- OS grid reference: SK 97232 69817
- Location: High Street, Lincoln, Lincolnshire,
- Country: England
- Denomination: Greek Orthodox Church
- Previous denomination: Church of England
- Website: orthodoxlincoln.org

History
- Former name: St Botolph's Church
- Status: Active
- Dedication: St Basil and St Paisios
- Dedicated: 1640s (Anglican), 2020s (Gk Orthodox)
- Earlier dedication: St Botolph
- Consecrated: 1721

Architecture
- Functional status: Active
- Heritage designation: Grade II listed
- Designated: 1953
- Architect(s): William Watkins and Canon Frederick Heathcote Sutton
- Architectural type: Medieval church
- Style: Medieval
- Completed: 1106–1203

Administration
- Diocese: Greek Orthodox Archdiocese of Thyateira and Great Britain
- Parish: Lincoln

Clergy
- Priest: Fr Panagiotis

The Church of St Basil and St Paisios, Lincoln also known as the Greek Orthodox Church of St Basil and St Paisios in Lincoln is an active Greek Orthodox Church in Lincoln, Lincolnshire, England. The building was formerly St Botolph's Church.

== History ==
The church is a former Church of England church which was dedicated to St Botolph and was active between 1721 and 2020 or 2021. The church tower was built in 1721 and the nave and north aisle in 1861, with later changes and additions. In 2021, it was sold to the Greek Orthodox Church. The bells were moved from the church as part of the sale.

The church is in the Greek Orthodox Archdiocese of Thyateira and Great Britain, Its rededication is to St. Basil and St. Paisios. The church is a Grade II Listed building. In 2024, support was secured from the National Lottery Heritage Fund to undertake a full survey of the building's fabric.
