= Saint Sophia Cathedral, London =

Greek Orthodox church in London, England

Coordinates: 51°30′44.9″N 0°11′29.3″W

Saint Sophia's Cathedral
- Greek Orthodox Cathedral of Divine Wisdom
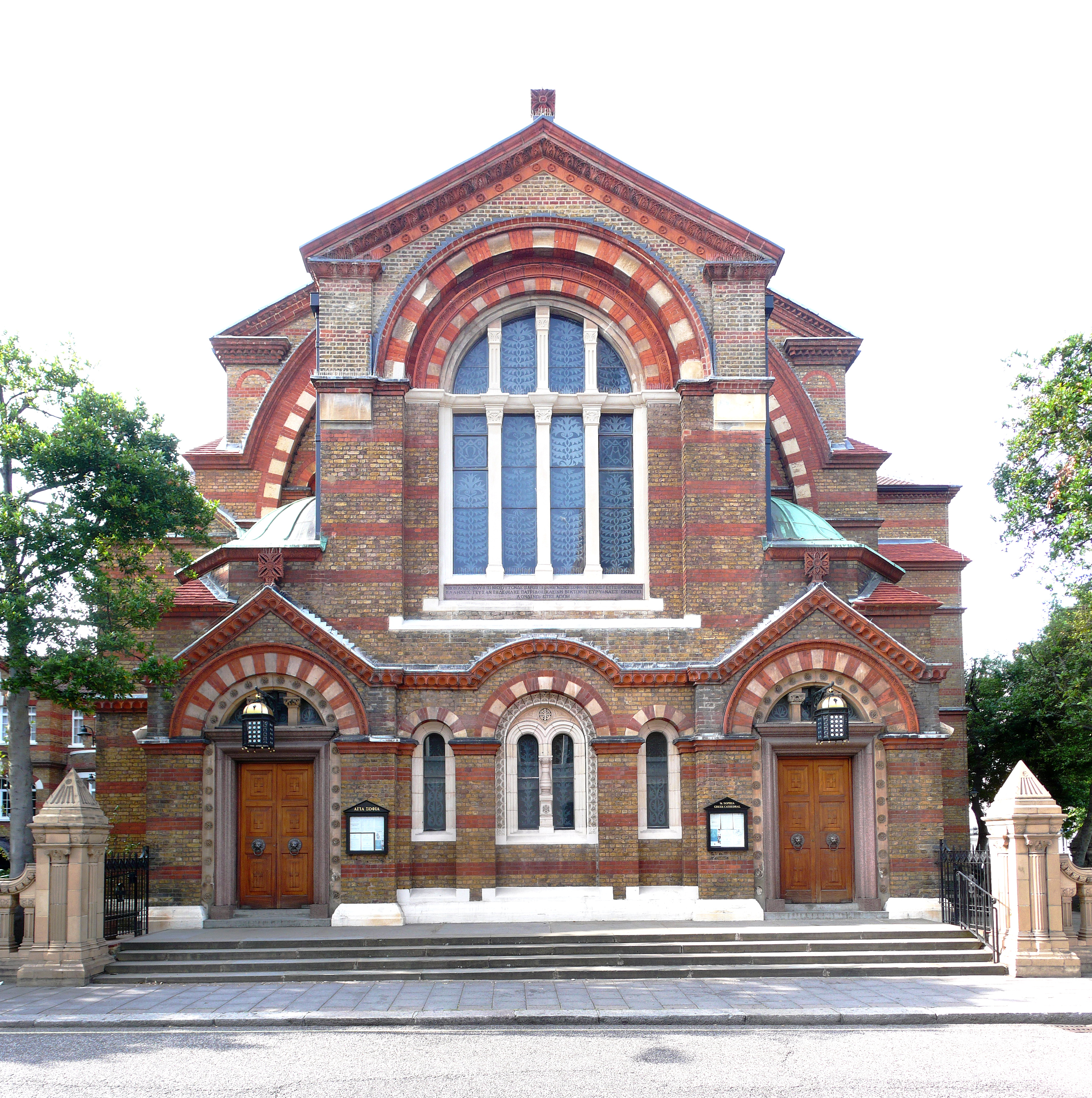
- Saint Sophia's Cathedral
- Location: Bayswater, London, W2
- Country: England
- Language: Greek
- Denomination: Eastern Orthodox Church
- Tradition: Byzantine Rite
- Website: stsophia.org.uk

History
- Status: Cathedral
- Consecrated: 5 February 1882

Architecture
- Functional status: Active
- Heritage designation: Grade I
- Architect: John Oldrid Scott
- Style: Byzantine Revival

Administration
- Diocese: Greek Orthodox Archdiocese of Thyateira and Great Britain

Clergy
- Archbishop: Nikitas Loulias
- Vicar: Archimandrite Nephon (Tsimalis)

Saint Sophia Cathedral (Greek: Καθεδρικός ναός της Αγίας Σοφίας, romanized: Kathedrikós naós tis Agías Sophías) is a Greek Orthodox church on Moscow Road in the Bayswater area of London.

It was consecrated as the Church of the Holy Wisdom on 5 February 1882 by Antonios, Metropolitan of Corfu, as a focus for the prosperous Greek community that had settled in London, particularly around Paddington, Bayswater and Notting Hill.

Today, in addition to its regular Saturday and Sunday services, it hosts a Greek polyphonic choir, Byzantine music, and an associated school in which pupils discover the history and language of Greece and take Greek dancing lessons.

== History ==
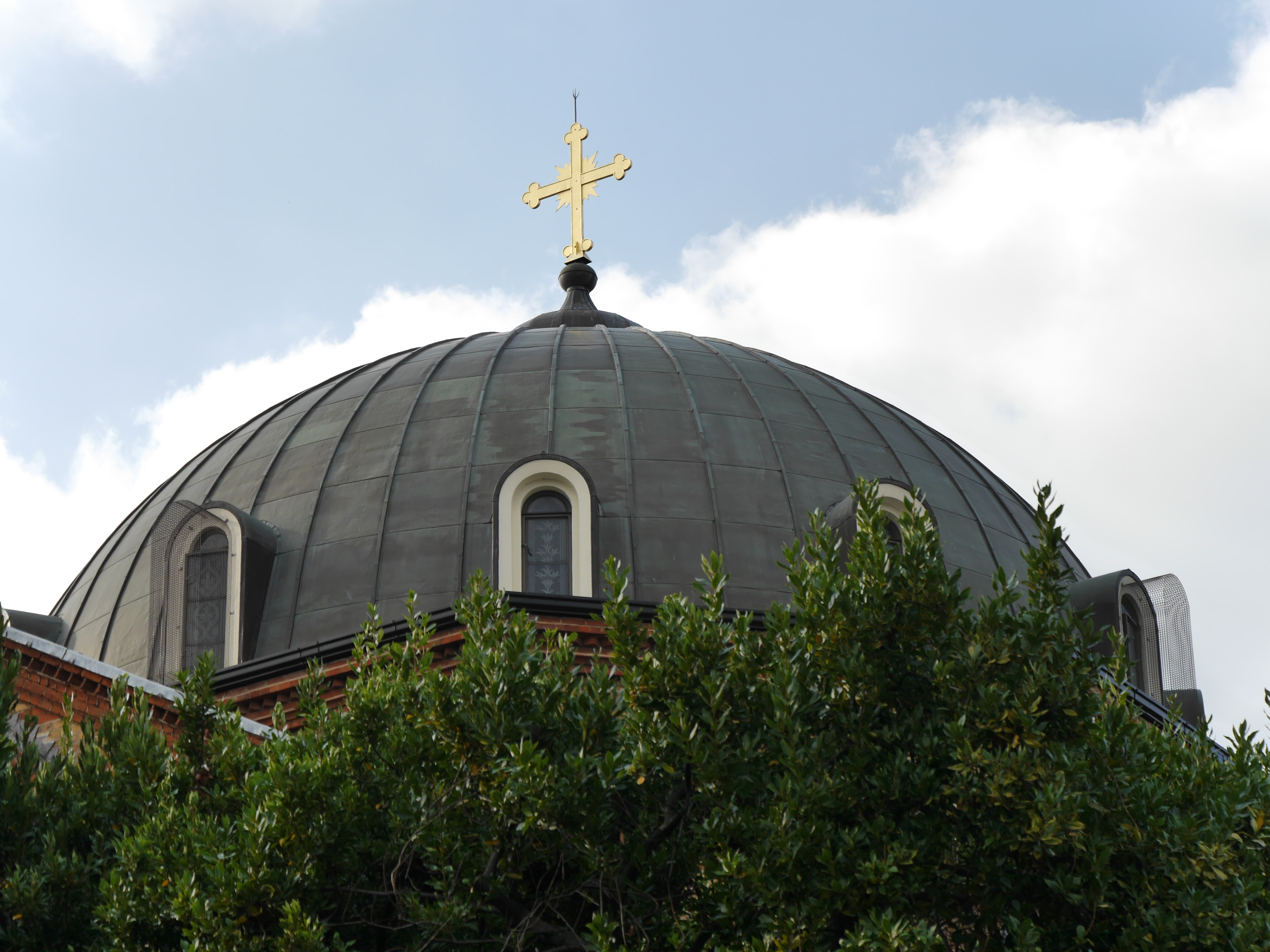
Detail of the dome

This was the third church to bear this name, the previous two (at Finsbury Square and at 82 London Wall) having been outgrown by the population of the Orthodox community, which had been swelled by settlers from the Greek diaspora and visitors who came through the busy shipping routes that converged on London.

St Sophia was commissioned by a committee presided over by Emmanuel Mavrocordato (1830–1909), assisted by Constantinos A lonidis, Sophoclis Constantinidis, Petros P. Rodocanachi, Paraskevas Sechiaris and Demetrius Stefanovich Schilizzi (1839–1893) and the lawyer and traveller, Edwin Freshfield (Note: Dr Freshfield cooperated with H. Cosmo Bonsor to build the Grade I listed church in Kingswood, Surrey initially known as St Sophia or the God of Wisdom now Church of Jesus Christ and the Wisdom of God.). The cost of £50,000 was raised in three years by the Greek community, including prosperous and influential London merchants and financiers. The first Liturgy was celebrated on 1 June 1879, 18 months after Eustratios Ralli laid the first stone. The cathedral recently opened a small museum to display some of the treasures donated to the cathedral by its 19th-century patrons and its links to London's Greek community.

In 1922, the Greek Ecumenical Patriarchate chose St Sophia as a Cathedral of the Metropolis of Thyateira and Great Britain, encompassing all Orthodox Christians in the British Isles and Malta.

During World War II, London became the seat of the Greek government in exile, and St Sophia therefore became the cathedral of the Greek Nation. It was bombed during the Blitz, but was subsequently repaired.

In 2006, a museum opened in the basement of the church.

== Architecture ==
St Sophia is a Byzantine Revival design by architect John Oldrid Scott. Scott was responsible for many significant British churches, and was subsequently commissioned by Ralli to build St Stephen's Greek Orthodox Chapel in West Norwood Cemetery in 1873.

From the outside the Cathedral appears relatively modest, only hinting at its style through the domed roof and arched windows. Inside it is elaborately decorated with polychromatic marble.

The iconostasis (screen of icons) was painted by Ludwig Thiersch, who had studied religious painting in Athens. He had suggested that the walls not be decorated with frescos, because of the damp climate in London. Instead, the trustees commissioned Byzantine-inspired mosaics from G M Mercenero & Co, to the designs of A G Walker. From 1926, more mosaics were commissioned from Boris Anrep.

== Gallery ==
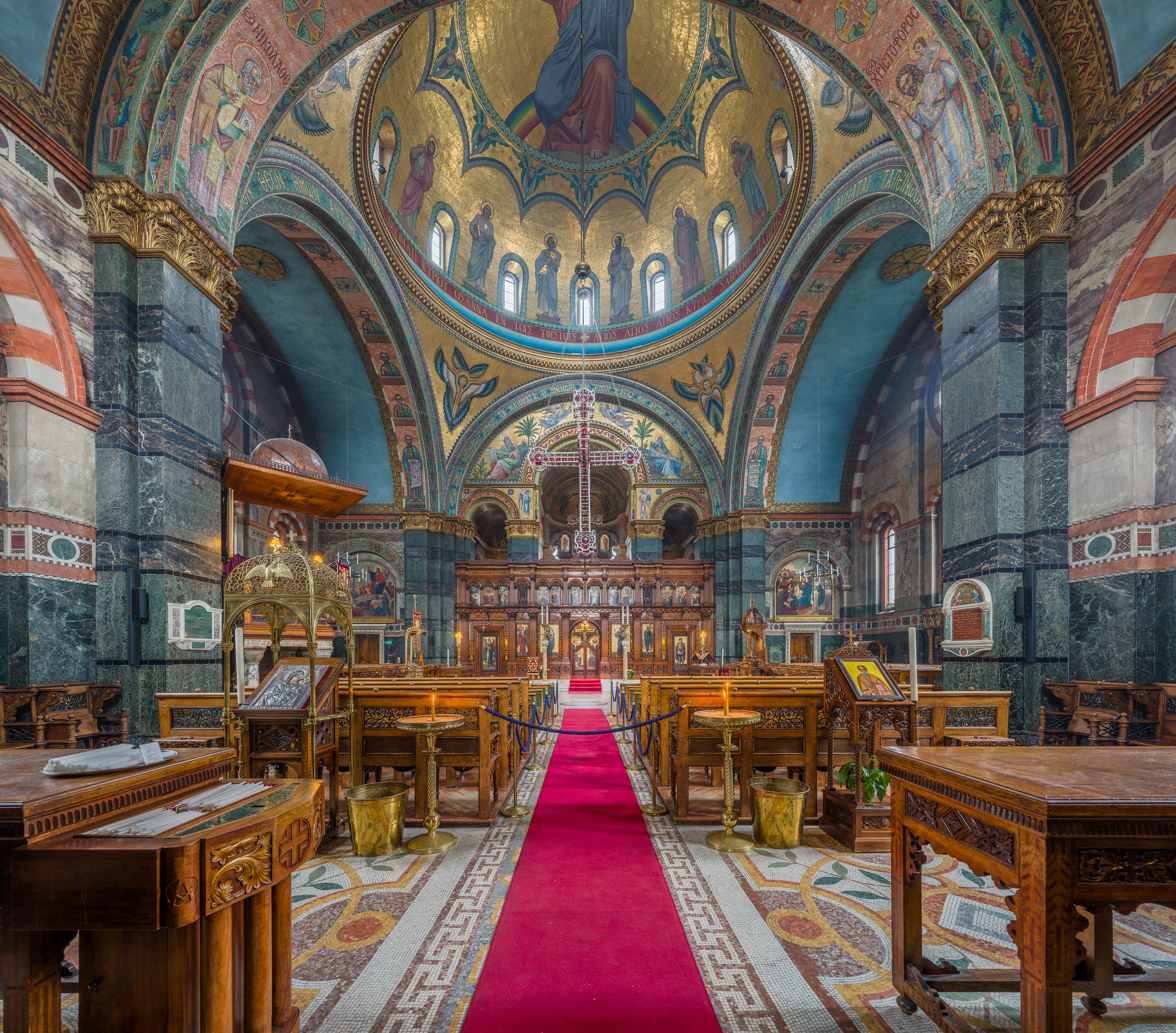
Looking towards the altar.

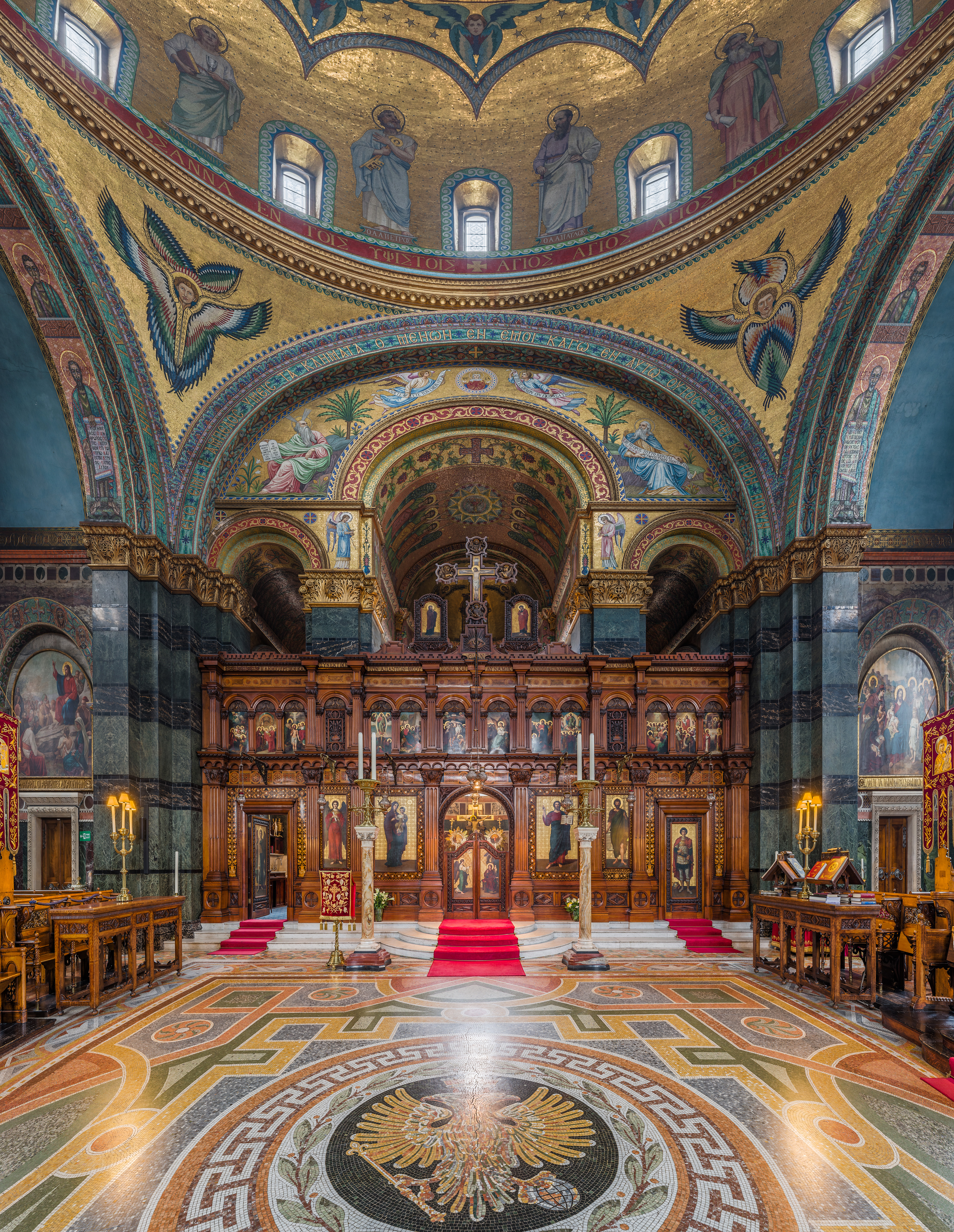
The iconostasis in front of the altar.

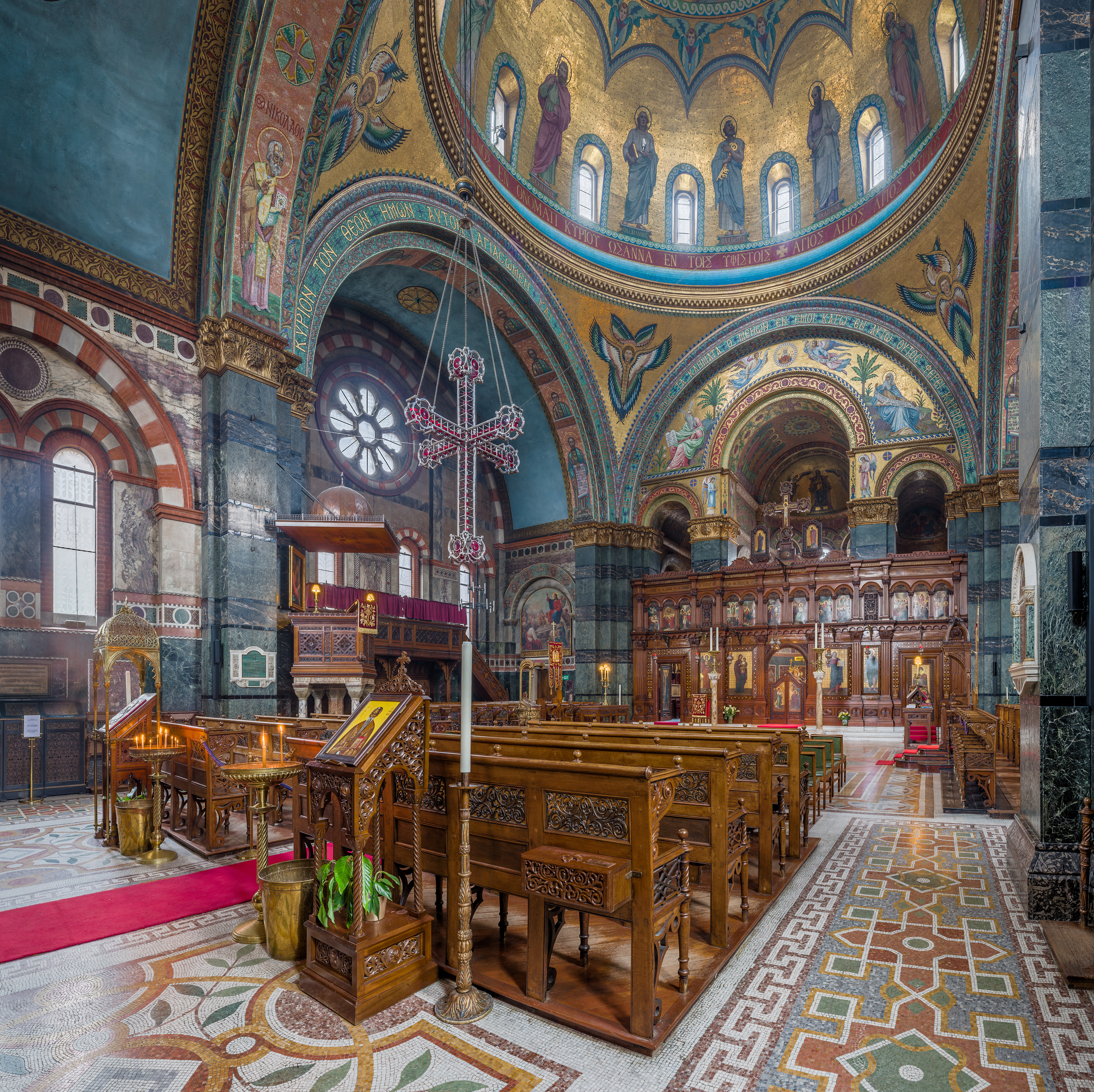
The interior.
