= Methodios Fouyias =

Methodios Fouyias (Greek: Μεθόδιος Φούγιας; 12 September 1924 in Corinth – 7 July 2006) served as Greek Orthodox Archbishop of Thyateira and Great Britain (concomitantly apokrisiarios of the Ecumenical Patriarch to the Archbishop of Canterbury) from 1979 to 1988. After studies in the Theological Faculty of the University of Athens and parochial responsibilities in Munich, he served in various positions within the Patriarchate of Alexandria culminating in that of Metropolitan of Axum covering Ethiopia and the Horn of Africa. Fouiyas' studies and encounters led to a favourable understanding of the Church of England which he saw in some respects as a continuator of the Saxon Church before the Norman Conquest, the Gregorian Reform and most importantly the East–West Schism of 1054. He was thus seen as the ideal candidate for the post of archbishop in London. Several years experience however of deepening division within Anglicanism led him openly to suggest (in an article in The Times) that the road to unity for Anglicans lay in submission to the discipline of the Roman Catholic church. As his post involved close relations with Lambeth it was judged expedient that he should be recalled. Methodios assumed the title of Pisidia and continued his studies (notably on Bessarion) in Greece.

Eastern Orthodox Church titles
Preceded by Athenagoras (Kokkinakis)	Archbishop of Thyateira and Great Britain; 1979 – 1988	Succeeded by Gregorios (Theocharous)
