= Eastern Orthodox Metropolitanate of Singapore and South Asia =

Diocese of the Eastern Orthodox Church

Orthodox Metropolis of Singapore and South Asia

Orthodox

Location
- Territory: Singapore; Malaysia; Indonesia; Brunei; Afghanistan; Pakistan; Bhutan; Nepal; Bangladesh; India; Maldives; Sri Lanka; East Timor
- Headquarters: Singapore

Information
- Denomination: Eastern Orthodox
- Rite: Byzantine Rite
- Established: 9 January 2008
- Language: Greek, English

Current leadership
- Parent church: Ecumenical Patriarchate of Constantinople
- Governance: Episcopal
- Patriarch: Bartholomew I of Constantinople
- Metropolitan: Metropolitan Konstantinos (Tsilis)

Website
- omsgsa.org

The Metropolis of Singapore and South Asia is a diocese of the Ecumenical Patriarchate of Constantinople in the Eastern Orthodox Church. It is centered in Singapore and has jurisdiction over Eastern Orthodox Christians in the countries of Maritime Southeast Asia, with exception of Philippines which belonged to Metropolis of Hong Kong and Southeast Asia. It was founded in 9 January 2008 by the Holy Synod of the Ecumenical Patriarchate of Constantinople.

== History ==
Until 2008, the Ecumenical Patriarchate of Constantinople had one diocese in the regions of South and Southeastern Asia, created in November 1996 as Orthodox Metropolitanate of Hong Kong and Southeast Asia, with jurisdiction over: Hong Kong, Macao, China, Taiwan, Mongolia, Philippines, Vietnam, Cambodia, Laos, Thailand, Myanmar, and also Singapore, Indonesia, Malaysia, Brunei, Timor, Maldives, Sri Lanka, Bangladesh, India, Nepal, Bhutan, Pakistan and Afghanistan.

On January 9, 2008, the Holy Synod of the Ecumenical Patriarchate decided to divide the huge area of the Metropolitanate of Hong Kong, by creating a new Eastern Orthodox Metropolitanate of Singapore and South Asia, with jurisdiction over Singapore, Indonesia, Malaysia, Brunei, Timor, Maldives, Sri Lanka, Bangladesh, India, Nepal, Bhutan, Pakistan and Afghanistan. After three years of administration, the first diocesan bishop was appointed. On November 3, 2011, the Holy Synod of the Ecumenical Patriarchate elected Archmandrite Konstantinos (Tsilis) as the first Metropolitan of Singapore and South Asia. He was ordained on November 21 by Ecumenical Patriarch Bartholomew I of Constantinople.

The Metropolitanate is divided into vicariates and parishes. The central parish in Singapore is served by Archimandrite Daniel Toyne. Father Chrysostomos Manalu is the archepiscopal vicar for Indonesia and Father John Tanveer is the only priest in Pakistan.

== See also ==
- Christianity in Singapore
- Greeks in India

== Bibliography ==
- Kiminas, Demetrius (2009). The Ecumenical Patriarchate: A History of Its Metropolitanates with Annotated Hierarch Catalogs. Wildside Press LLC. ISBN 9781434458766.
