= Eastern Orthodox Metropolis of Hong Kong and Southeast Asia =

Greek Orthodox Metropolis of Hong Kong and Southeast Asia

Orthodox

Location
- Territory: China; Taiwan; Mongolia; Philippines; Vietnam; Cambodia; Laos; Thailand; Myanmar
- Headquarters: Hong Kong

Information
- Denomination: Eastern Orthodox
- Rite: Byzantine Rite
- Established: November 1996
- Language: English

Current leadership
- Parent church: Ecumenical Patriarchate of Constantinople
- Governance: Episcopal
- Patriarch: Bartholomew I of Constantinople
- Metropolitan: Nektarios Tsilis

Website
- omhksea.org

The Metropolis of Hong Kong and Southeast Asia (Chinese: 正教會普世宗主教聖統香港及東南亞都主教教區) is a metropolis or archeparchy of the Ecumenical Patriarchate of Constantinople in the Eastern Orthodox Church, equivalent to an archdiocese in the Catholic Church. Centered in Hong Kong, it has jurisdiction over Eastern Orthodox Christians in Hong Kong, Macau, China, Taiwan, Mongolia, the Philippines, Vietnam, Cambodia, Laos, Thailand and Myanmar. It was established in November 1996 by the Holy and Sacred Synod of Constantinople. The incumbent metropolitan is Nektarios Tsilis.

== History ==
For several years, a small community of Eastern Orthodox Christians maintained an Orthodox presence in Hong Kong despite the absence of a resident priest. Members of the community, represented by the St. Luke Orthodox Community, petitioned Patriarch Bartholomew I of Constantinople to establish a permanent ecclesiastical presence in the region. Following proposals prepared by Bishop Athenagoras (later Metropolitan of Mexico, Central America and the Caribbean), the Holy and Sacred Synod of the Ecumenical Patriarchate of Constantinople established the Orthodox Metropolitanate of Hong Kong and Southeast Asia in November 1996.

The new metropolitanate was given jurisdiction over Hong Kong, Macau, China, Taiwan, Mongolia, the Philippines, Vietnam, Cambodia, Laos, Thailand, Myanmar, Singapore, Indonesia, Malaysia, Brunei, East Timor, the Maldives, Sri Lanka, Bangladesh, India, Nepal, Pakistan and Afghanistan.

On 2 December 1996, Archimandrite Nikitas (Lulias) was elected as the first Metropolitan of Hong Kong and Southeast Asia. His enthronement took place on 12 January 1997 at St. Luke Orthodox Cathedral in Stanley Fort, Hong Kong, with Metropolitan Athenagoras representing the Ecumenical Patriarchate.

In August 2007, Metropolitan Nikitas was transferred to the Metropolitanate of Dardanellia. On 9 January 2008, the Holy and Sacred Synod of the Ecumenical Patriarchate divided the metropolitanate and established the Metropolitanate of Singapore and South Asia, which assumed jurisdiction over Singapore, Indonesia, Malaysia, Brunei, East Timor, the Maldives, Sri Lanka, Bangladesh, India, Nepal, Pakistan and Afghanistan. The Metropolitanate of Hong Kong and Southeast Asia retained jurisdiction over Hong Kong, Macau, China, Taiwan, Mongolia, the Philippines, Vietnam, Cambodia, Laos, Thailand and Myanmar.

On the same day, Archimandrite Nektarios (Tsilis) was elected Metropolitan of Hong Kong and Southeast Asia. He was consecrated on 20 January 2008 at the Patriarchal Church of St. George in the Phanar, Constantinople (Istanbul), and was enthroned on 1 March 2008 at St. Luke Orthodox Cathedral in Hong Kong.

The metropolitanate has continued its pastoral work across the region, including the establishment of the parish in Davao City, Philippines, in 2018.

== See also ==
- Christianity in Hong Kong
- Eastern Orthodox Metropolitanate of Singapore and South Asia
- Exarchate of the Philippines
- Eastern Orthodox Metropolis of Korea
- Patriarchal Exarchate in South-East Asia (Moscow Patriarchate) – an exarchate of the Russian Orthodox Church

== Bibliography ==
- Kiminas, Demetrius (2009). The Ecumenical Patriarchate: A History of Its Metropolitanates with Annotated Hierarch Catalogs. Wildside Press LLC. ISBN 9781434458766.
