= Gerasimos Michaleas =

His Eminence Gerasimos
- Metropolitan of San Francisco
- Archdiocese: America
- See: San Francisco
- Installed: February 22, 2005
- Term ended: Incumbent
- Predecessor: Metropolitan Anthony

Personal details
- Born: Gerasimos Michaleas; August 2, 1945 (age 81) Kalamata, Greece
- Denomination: Greek Orthodox
- Education: Hellenic College/Holy Cross; Boston College

Metropolitan Gerasimos of San Francisco (born Gerasimos Michaleas; August 2, 1945) is a Greek Eastern Orthodox prelate who became the Metropolitan of San Francisco in the Greek Orthodox Church in 2005.

His spiritual flock comprises 67 Greek Orthodox parishes in Hawaii, Alaska, Oregon, Washington, California, Nevada, and Arizona. He was elected to his office by the Sacred and Holy Synod of the Ecumenical Patriarchate on February 22, 2005 to succeed Metropolitan Anthony. He was enthroned at the Ascension Greek Orthodox Cathedral in Oakland, California on April 2, 2005 by Archbishop Demetrios.

Metropolitan Gerasimos leads over 150,000 Greek Orthodox faithful in Alaska, Arizona, California, Hawaii, Nevada, Oregon, and Washington.

== Early life and education ==
Gerasimos Michaleas (born Kalamata, Greece, August 2, 1945) completed his primary and secondary education before emigrating to the United States. He earned B.A. and M.Div. degrees from Holy Cross Greek Orthodox School of Theology in Brookline, Massachusetts, in 1973 and 1976, respectively. He earned a master's Degree in counseling and school psychology from Boston College in 1986, and a doctorate in counseling and school psychology in 1993.

== Biography ==
Michaleas was ordained a deacon in 1979, and served as the archdeacon to Greek Orthodox Archbishop Iakovos until 1996. He was elected by the Ecumenical Patriarchate as the titular bishop of Krateia in 2001, and served as the chief secretary of the Holy Eparchial Synod of the Greek Orthodox Archdiocese of America until his election to serve the metropolis of San Francisco.

He served in administrative positions for many years at Hellenic College/Holy Cross, where he was variously registrar (1977–1979), dean of students (1980–1999), director of admissions and records (1998–2000), and finally administrative assistant to the president of Hellenic College/Holy Cross (2000–2001), a post he held until his election as Bishop of Krateia in December, 2001.

He taught courses in psychology at Hellenic College and in teleturgics (liturgical practice) at Holy Cross, and served as senior lecturer in personality and psychology at Northeastern University. He was also member of the staff of the outpatient clinic of the V.A. Medical Center in Boston. He is a member of the American Psychological Association and the American Counseling Association. The University Press of America published his doctoral dissertation, Intellectual Deficiencies in a Substance Abuse Population, in 1994.

Gerasimos maintains cordial relations with other religious leaders as a member of the Holy Eparchial Synod of the Greek Orthodox Archdiocese of America (the chief ruling body of the Greek Orthodox churches in America,) the Canonical Bishops of the West Coast (i.e., Orthodox bishops,) and the Joint Committee of Orthodox And Catholic Bishops.

Eastern Orthodox Church titles
Preceded by Anthony (Gergiannakis)	Metropolitan of San Francisco; 2005 –	Succeeded by Incumbent
Preceded by Gennadios (Zervos)	Bishop of Krateia; 2001 – 2005	Succeeded by Andrew (Peshko)
