= Greek Orthodox Metropolis of San Francisco =

Metropolis of San Francisco

Location
- Country: United States of America
- Territory: Alaska, Arizona, California, Hawaii, Nevada, Oregon, Washington

Statistics
- Population: Total: ~150,000
- Churches: 70

Information
- Cathedral: Annunciation Cathedral
- Secular priests: 64

Current leadership
- Patriarch: Ecumenical Patriarch of Constantinople
- Major Archbishop: Archbishop Elpidophoros of America
- Metropolitan: Gerasimos (Michaleas)

The Greek Orthodox Metropolis of San Francisco is an ecclesiastical territory or metropolis of the Greek Orthodox Church in the Pacific region of the United States, encompassing the states of Alaska, Arizona, California, Hawaii, Nevada, Oregon, and Washington. It is part of the Greek Orthodox Archdiocese of America and is led by a metropolitan bishop who serves as the priest of the mother church, Annunciation Cathedral in the City of San Francisco. Right Reverend Metropolitan Gerasimos was enthroned as the Greek Orthodox Metropolitan Bishop of San Francisco on April 2, 2005, following his election to that post by the Holy Synod of the Ecumenical Patriarchate in Phanar, Constantinople, Turkey.

== Metropolitans of San Francisco ==
- Anthony (Gergiannakis) (1979 – 2004)
- Gerasimos (Michaleas) (2005 – present)
