= St Barnabas Greek Orthodox Church =

Greek Orthodox church in Finsbury Road, Wood Green, London, England

Coordinates: 51.601579°N 0.116345°W

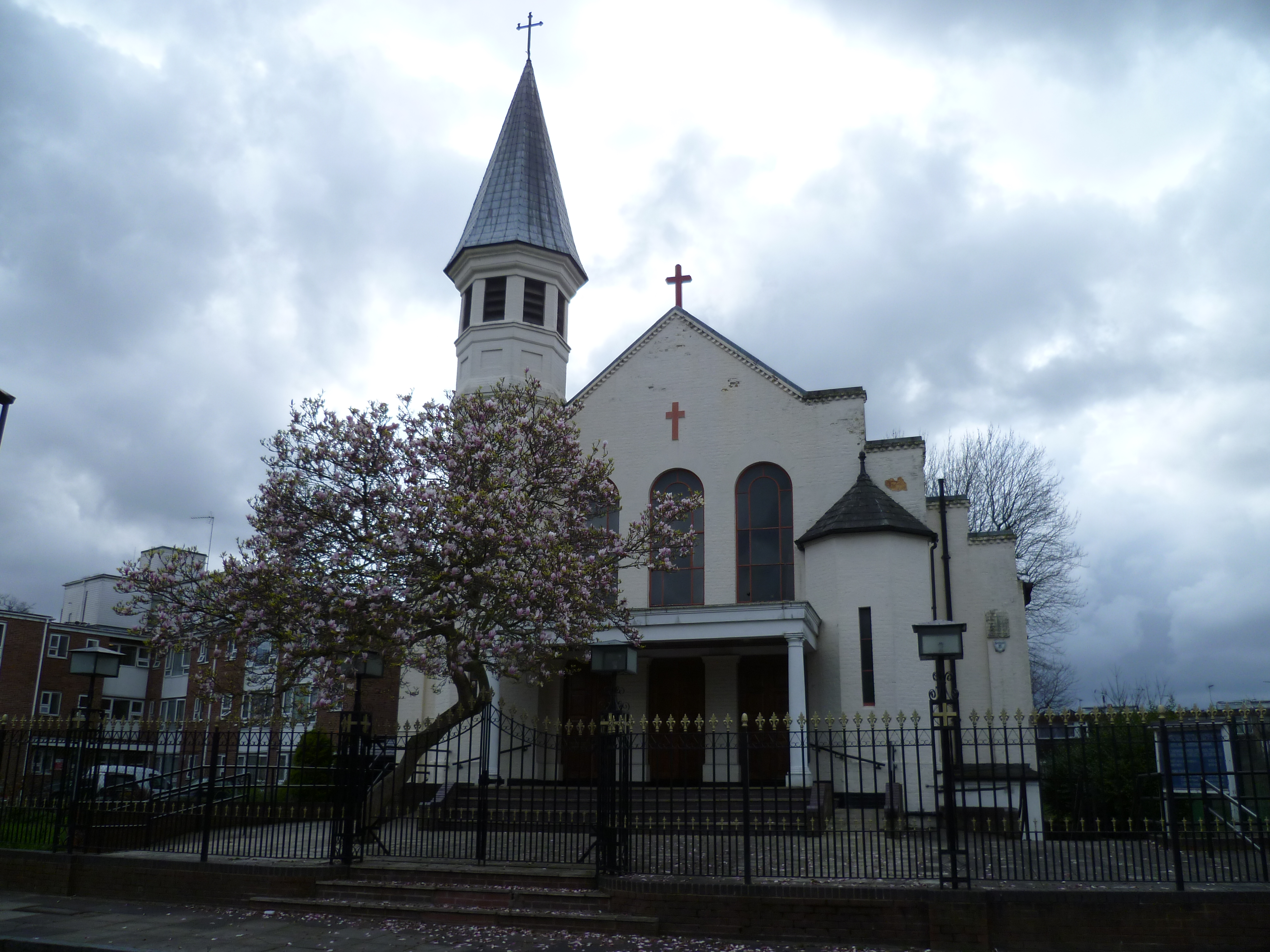
Saint Barnabas Greek Orthodox Church

Saint Barnabas Greek Orthodox Church is a Greek Orthodox church in Finsbury Road, Wood Green, London.

The church was opened in 1876 as a baptist chapel. It was used by the Catholic Apostolic from 1904 up to the mid 1960s before being acquired by the Greek Orthodox church in the 1970s.
