= Nikitas Lioulias =

American Greek Orthodox archbishop

His Eminence Nikitas
- Archbishop of Thyateira and Great Britain
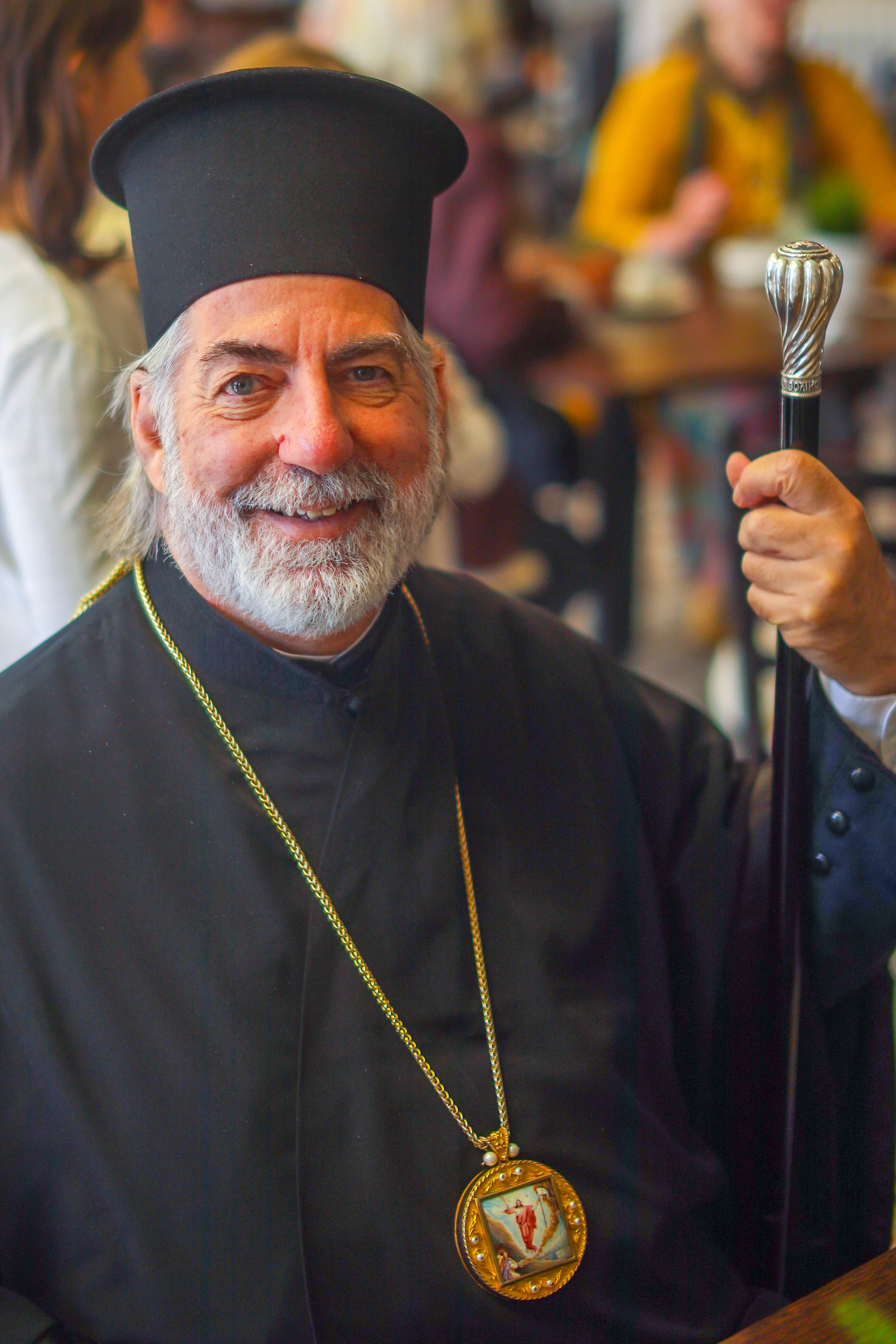
- Archbishop Nikitas in 2022.
- Church: Ecumenical Patriarchate of Constantinople
- Archdiocese: Archdiocese of Thyateira and Great Britain
- See: Thyateira
- Installed: July 27, 2019
- Predecessor: Gregorios (Theocharous)
- Other posts: Director, Patriarch Athenagoras Orthodox Institute

Orders
- Consecration: December 14, 1996

Personal details
- Born: Nikitas Lioulias; June 22, 1955 (age 71) Tampa, Florida, USA
- Denomination: Eastern Orthodox Christianity
- Parents: Gus and Kalliope Lioulias
- Education: University of Florida; Hellenic College of the Holy Cross

Archbishop Nikitas (born June 22, 1955) is the Greek Orthodox Archbishop of Great Britain under the Ecumenical Patriarchate of Constantinople, elected by the Sacred and Holy Synod of the Ecumenical Patriarchate on 12 June 2019. His full title is: His Eminence Nikitas, Archbishop of Thyateira and Great Britain

Before his election as archbishop, he was the Metropolitan of the Dardanelles and director of the Patriarch Athenagoras Orthodox Institute in Berkeley, California. Prior, he served as the first Metropolitan of the Greek Orthodox Metropolitanate of Hong Kong and Southeast Asia.

== Early life and education ==
Lioulias was born on June 22, 1955, to Constantine (Gus) and Kalliope (Kally) Lioulias in Tampa, Florida, where he was raised with his brother John. Growing up, he was a parishioner of St. Nicholas Greek Orthodox Church and attended Tarpon Springs High School. After high school he matriculated into the University of Florida, where he was a member of the university honor society Savant. Lioulias earned a Bachelor of Arts degree with honors in 1976.

After attaining his undergraduate degree, he enrolled in the Holy Cross Greek Orthodox School of Theology, earning the degree of Master of Divinity in 1980. His tenure as a graduate student was marked with prestige and distinction: He was listed in the Who's Who of American Colleges and University Students in 1975 and 1979; he was a Rotary International Graduate Scholar from 1980 to 1981; and a graduate fellow of the Ministry of the Exterior, Greece, from 1981 to 1982. Following this, he pursued additional graduate study at the University of Thessaloniki, Greece through November 1982. He also studied Russian language in St. Petersburg, Russia at the St. Petersburg Theological Academy from late 1992 to mid 1993.

== 1974 Epiphany celebration ==
Every January sixth, the Orthodox Christian communities of the greater Tampa Bay area gather at St. Nicholas Cathedral in Tarpon Springs to observe the feast of Christ's baptism in the Jordan River and celebrate the blessing of the waters. This local tradition has been a staple of the Greek-American community since 1903 and is said to be the largest such celebration in the western hemisphere. Part of the celebration involves the retrieval of a wooden cross from spring bayou by local Orthodox Christian young men, aged 16–18. A specially crafted white cross is tossed by a senior cleric, usually the Archbishop of America, into Spring Bayou as part of the service of the Great Blessing of the Waters. The retrieval has developed into a contest and local lore states the young man who retrieves the cross from the bayou will enjoy a year of special blessings. Young Archbishop Nikitas retrieved the cross in 1974, under unique circumstances. On January 6, 1974, when the traditional white wooden cross was thrown into Spring Bayou by Archbishop Iakovos, it was not quickly retrieved. In turn, the Archbishop did something spontaneous—he took the gold blessing cross he was carrying and tossed it into the water toward the divers. The gold cross was retrieved by Nikitas Lioulias. Some saw this occasion as a sign of the young mans future ministry in the Greek Orthodox Church. The white cross was later found by a distant cousin of his, Manuel Karvounis.

== Pastoral and administrative service ==
Nikitas' first assignment upon ordination was Associate Pastor at Saints Constantine and Helen Cathedral in Merrillville, Indiana, where he remained until 1987, at which time he became the chancellor of the Greek Orthodox Diocese (now Metropolis) of Chicago. During his tenure as Chancellor from 1987 to 1995, he was involved in numerous educational, community service, and interfaith activities. He lectured a course in Orthodox Christian Theology at Loyola University, Chicago, Illinois (1988 to 1991). In 1994 he was appointed Director of Development for the International Orthodox Christian Charities and on July 1, 1995, he became Pastor of the St. Demetrios Orthodox Church in Chicago.

== Episcopacy ==
Lioulias was first elected to the episcopacy by the Holy Synod of the Ecumenical Patriarchate in December 1996 to oversee the Orthodox Christian population of Southeast Asia. He was consecrated a Hierarch and named Metropolitan of Hong Kong and South East Asia on Saturday December 14, 1996 in at the Patriarchal Cathedral of St. George in the Phanar in Istanbul, Turkey. His enthronement (formal installation as the metropolitan of the metropolis) took place shortly thereafter on Sunday January 12, 1997 at the Cathedral of Saint Luke the Evangelist in Hong Kong. He was the first metropolitan bishop of Hong Kong and his flock included churches in South East Asia, China, India, Indonesia, the Philippines and Singapore.

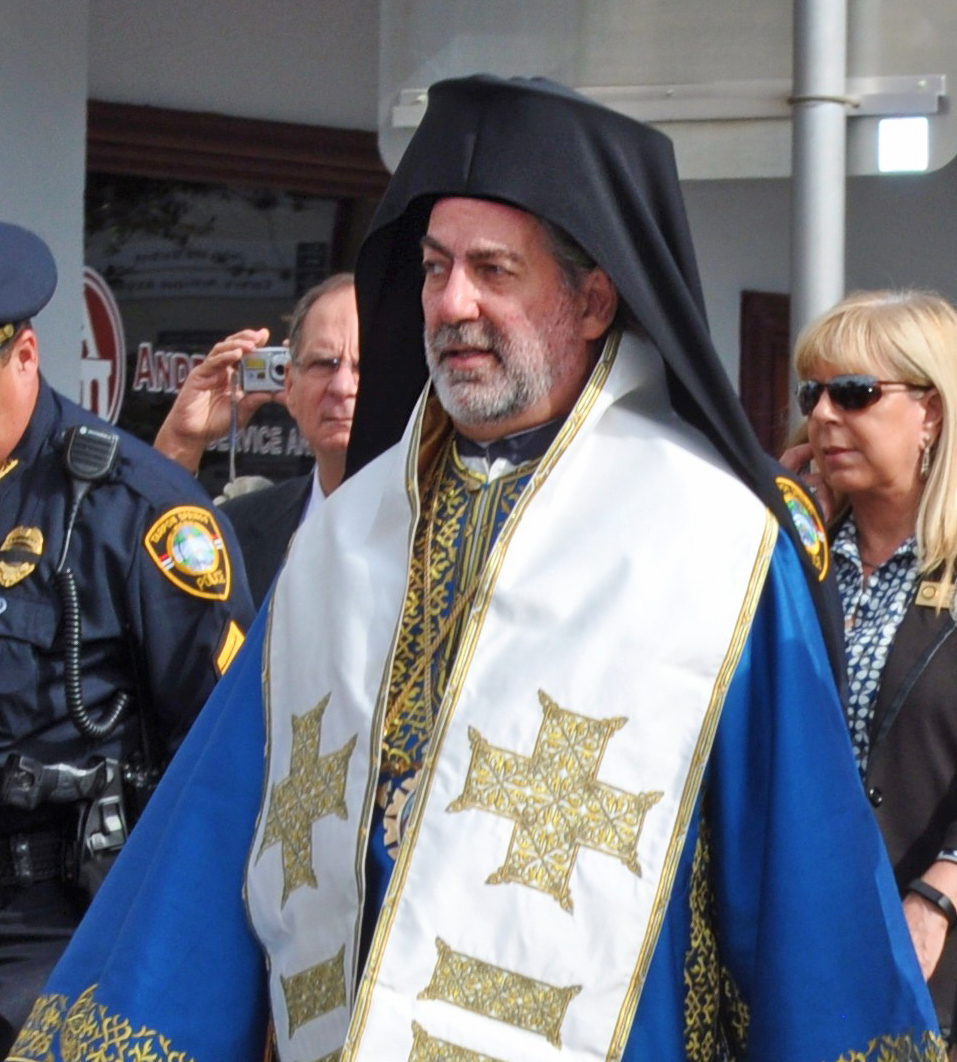
Metropolitan Nikitas at the 2015 Tarpon Springs Epiphany celebration.

Following his tenure as metropolitan of Hong Kong, His Eminence Metropolitan Nikitas was elected the Metropolitan of the Dardanelles and appointed Director of the Patriarch Athenagoras Orthodox Institute in Berkeley, California in March 2007.

On 12 June 2019 he was elected Archbishop of Great Britain by the Holy Synod of the Ecumenical Patriarchate of Constantinople. His enthronement occurred July 27, 2019 in London, England, at the Cathedral of the Divine Wisdom. He is a patron of the Fellowship of Saint Alban and Saint Sergius.

In May 2023, he took part in the 2023 Coronation of Charles III as one of the faith leaders offering prayers for the newly crowned King.

== Anti-trafficking advocacy ==
Archbishop Nikitas has spearheaded the Ecumenical Patriarchate's Committee on Human Trafficking and Modern Slavery since 2017, meeting with various leaders and organizing three international forums on the issue. The first Forum, “Sins Before Our Eyes,” was held in Istanbul, Turkey, in February 2017. The second Forum, “Old Problems in the New World,” was held in Buenos Aires, Argentina, in May 2018. The third forum, "Action, Awareness, and Impact" was held in Istanbul in January 2019. In addition to the international forums, Archbishop Nikitas travels internationally delivering speeches and seminars to promote awareness and action.

Eastern Orthodox Church titles
Preceded by Gregorios (Theocharous)	Archbishop of Thyateira and Great Britain; 2019 –	Succeeded by incumbent
Preceded by Anthony (Gergiannakis)	Metropolitan of the Dardanelles; 2008 – 2019	Succeeded by vacant
Preceded by none	Metropolitan of Hong Kong and Southeast Asia; 1997 – 2007	Succeeded by Nektarios (Tsilis)
