= Anthony Gergiannakis =

Former Greek Orthodox Metropolitan of San Francisco

His Eminence Anthony
- Metropolitan of San Francisco
- Archdiocese: America
- See: San Francisco
- Installed: July, 1979
- Term ended: December 25, 2004
- Successor: Gerasimos (Micheleas)

Orders
- Ordination: Diaconate July 7, 1958; Priesthood September 28, 1960
- Consecration: April 13, 1978

Personal details
- Born: Andonios Gergiannakis; March 2, 1935 Avgeniki, Crete, Greece
- Died: December 25, 2004 (aged 69) San Francisco
- Buried: Monastery of the Life-Giving Spring, Dunlap, California
- Denomination: Greek Orthodox
- Education: Theological School of Halki, Halki, Turkey

Metropolitan Anthony of San Francisco was the first Metropolitan Bishop of the Greek Orthodox Metropolis of San Francisco, a metropolis of the Greek Orthodox Archdiocese of America, under the spiritual authority of the Ecumenical Patriarch of Constantinople. His first bishopric was that of the Eighth Archdiocesan District of the Greek Orthodox Archdiocese with headquarters in Denver, Colorado. He was subsequently enthroned as Bishop Anthony of San Francisco as the first bishop of the newly formed Greek Orthodox Diocese of San Francisco. He became titular Metropolitan of the Dardanelles, but retained leadership of the diocese. When diocese was elevated to the status of Metropolis of San Francisco, Metropolitan Anthony was named the Greek Orthodox Metropolitan of San Francisco.

== Education ==
Anthony Gergiannakis (b. Avgeniki, Crete, Greece, March 2, 1935), after basic elementary education, entered the Ecclesiastical School of Agia Trias (Holy Trinity) in Chania, Crete. Upon completion, he went to the renowned Halki seminary of the Ecumenical Patriarchate, where he received his degree in Orthodox Theology in 1960.

== Early career ==
As a priest, Fr. Anthony served Greek Orthodox parishes in Ansonia, Connecticut (Holy Trinity Church); Chicago Heights, Illinois (Assumption Church); and Madison, Wisconsin (Assumption Church). In 1974, he was named Dean of Saint George Cathedral in Montreal, Quebec, Canada.

== Leadership ==
Anthony set up and expanded a number of programs in the metropolis, including the forming of the annual Greek Folk Dance Festival in various locations. He was involved in education in cultural and religious themes. He was also instrumental in the founding of three Orthodox monasteries in the metropolis: Saint Anthony's Monastery in Florence, Arizona, the Monastery of the Theotokos the Life-Giving Spring in Dunlap, California (where his body is interred), and Saint John the Forerunner Monastery in Goldendale, Washington.

Eastern Orthodox Church titles
Preceded by Position established	Metropolitan of San Francisco; 1978 – 2004	Succeeded by Gerasimos (Michaleas)
Preceded by ?	Metropolitan of the Dardanelles; 2001 – 2005	Succeeded by Nikitas (Lulias)
