= Thyatira =

Ancient Greek city in Asia Minor

- Θυάτειρα (Ancient Greek)
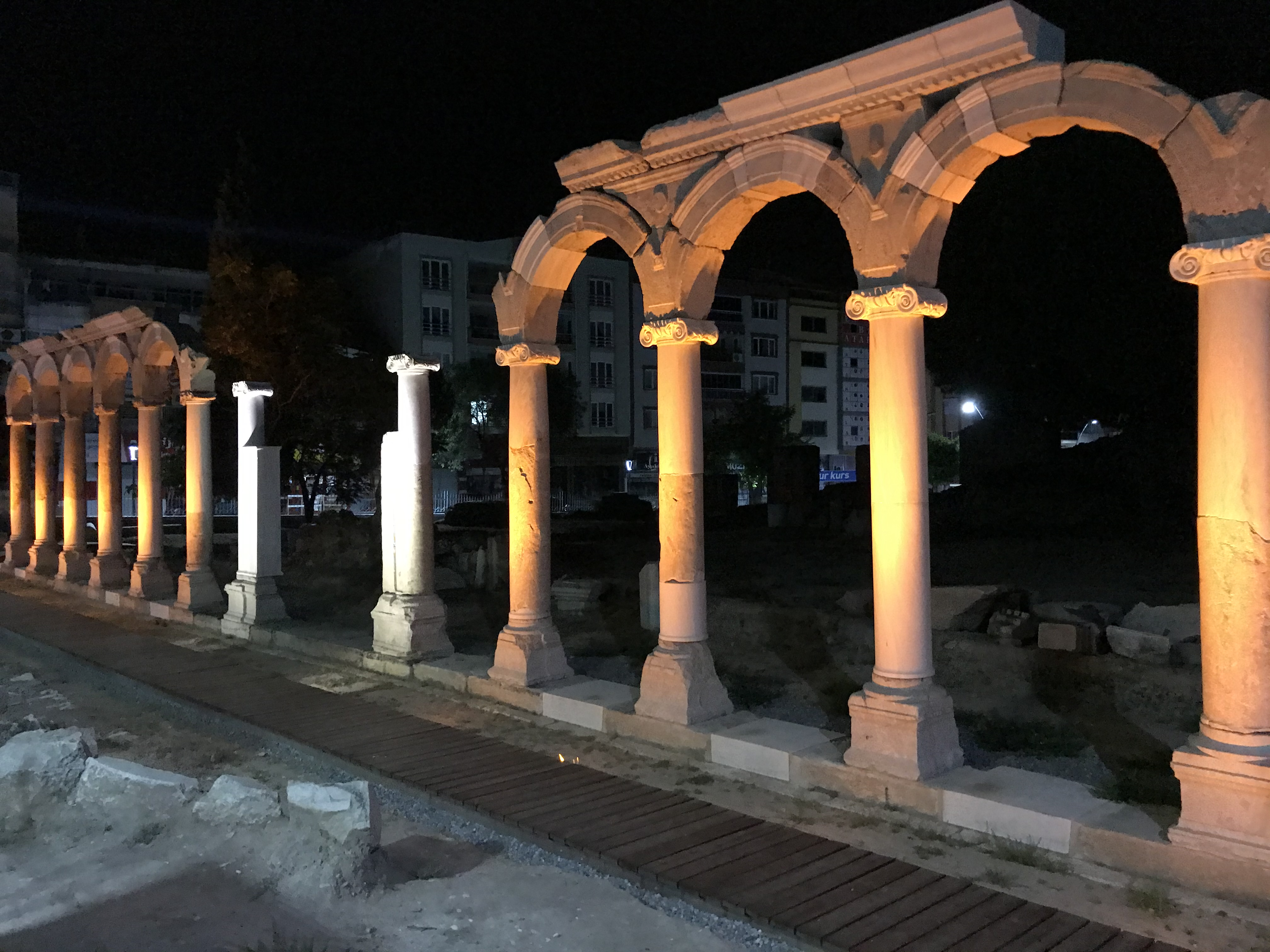
- Remains of the colonnaded street in Thyatira

- Location within Turkey
- 38.920090°N 27.836253°E
- Type: Settlement
- Periods: Bronze Age, Hellenistic period, Roman Empire, Byzantine Empire
- Cultures: Seha River Land, Lydian, Greek, Persian, Roman, Byzantine
- Location: Akhisar, Manisa Province, Turkey
- Region: Lydia

History
- Built: Early Bronze Age; re-colonized 3rd century BC
- Built by: Lydians; Macedonian colonists (3rd century BC)

Site notes
- Material: Stone, brick
- Elevation: 103 m (338 ft)
- Architectural styles: Hellenistic, Roman
- Condition: Ruined
- Owner: Public
- Public access: Yes
- One of the seven churches mentioned in the Book of Revelation

Thyateira (also Thyatira; Ancient Greek: Θυάτειρα) was the name of an ancient Greek city in Asia Minor, now the modern Turkish city of Akhisar ("white castle"), Manisa Province. The name is probably Lydian. It lies in the far west of Turkey, southwest of Istanbul and east-northeast of Athens. It is about 50 miles (80 km) from the Aegean Sea.

== History ==
It was an ancient Greek city called Pelopia (Ancient Greek: Πελόπεια) and Semiramis (Ancient Greek: Σεμίραμις), before it was renamed to Thyateira (Θυάτειρα), during the Hellenistic era in 290 BC, by the King Seleucus I Nicator. He was at war with Lysimachus when he learned that his wife had given birth to a daughter. According to Stephanus of Byzantium, he called this city "Thuateira" from Greek θυγάτηρ, θυγατέρα (thugatēr, thugatera), meaning "daughter", although it is likely that it is an older, Lydian name. In classical times, Thyatira stood on the border between Lydia and Mysia. During the Roman era, (1st century AD), it was famous for its dyeing facilities and was a center of the purple cloth trade. Among the ancient ruins of the city, inscriptions have been found relating to the guild of dyers in the city. Indeed, more guilds συντεχνία syntechnia (syndicate) are known in Thyatira than any other contemporary city in the Roman province of Asia (inscriptions mention the following: wool-workers, linen-workers, makers of outer garments, dyers, leather-workers, tanners, potters, bakers, slave-dealers, and bronze-smiths).

In early Christian times, Thyateira was home to a significant Christian church, mentioned as one of the seven Churches of the Book of Revelation. In Revelation, a character called Jezebel persuades the Christians of Thyateira to commit sexual immorality and to eat food sacrificed to idols. Some commentators such as Benson and Doddridge have concluded that what is being here practised in this prophetic Thyatira is the same apostasy promoted in the Kingdom of Israel by Jezebel as mentioned in the Books of Kings and that use of her name here is a direct reference to such. Indeed, as Doddridge notes, "the resemblance appears so great" that, in his view, it is the "same heresy which is represented".

According to Acts of the Apostles, the Apostle Paul and Silas visit Philippi during Paul's second or third journey. While there, Paul and Silas meet a woman named Lydia of Thyatira who hosts them to meet church members.

In 366, a battle fought near Thyateira saw the army of Roman emperor Valens defeat Roman usurper Procopius.

== Notable people ==
Artemidorus (Ancient Greek: Ἀρτεμίδωρος) of Thyateira was an athlete who won the Stadion race in the 193rd Olympiad (8 BC).

Nicander (Ancient Greek: Νίκανδρος), also known as Nicander of Thyateira (Ancient Greek: Νίκανδρος ὁ Θυατειρηνός) was an ancient Greek grammarian.

Lydia of Thyatira, businesswoman in the Acts of the Apostles chapter 16 verse 11–40.

== Bishopric ==
The city was home to a Christian community from the apostolic period. The community continued until 1922, when the Orthodox Christian population was deported.

In 1922, the Ecumenical Patriarch of Constantinople appointed an exarch for Western and Central Europe with the title Archbishop of Thyateira. The current archbishop of Thyateira (since 2019) is Nikitas Lulias. The Archbishop of Thyateira resides in London and has pastoral responsibility for the Greek Orthodox Church in Great Britain.

The see of Thyatira is also included, without archiepiscopal rank, in the Roman Catholic Church's list of titular sees.

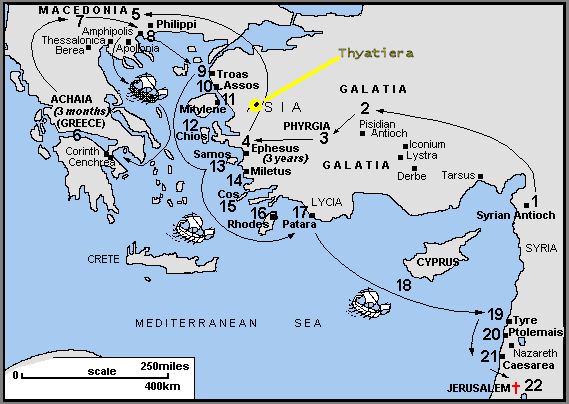
Paul's third journey

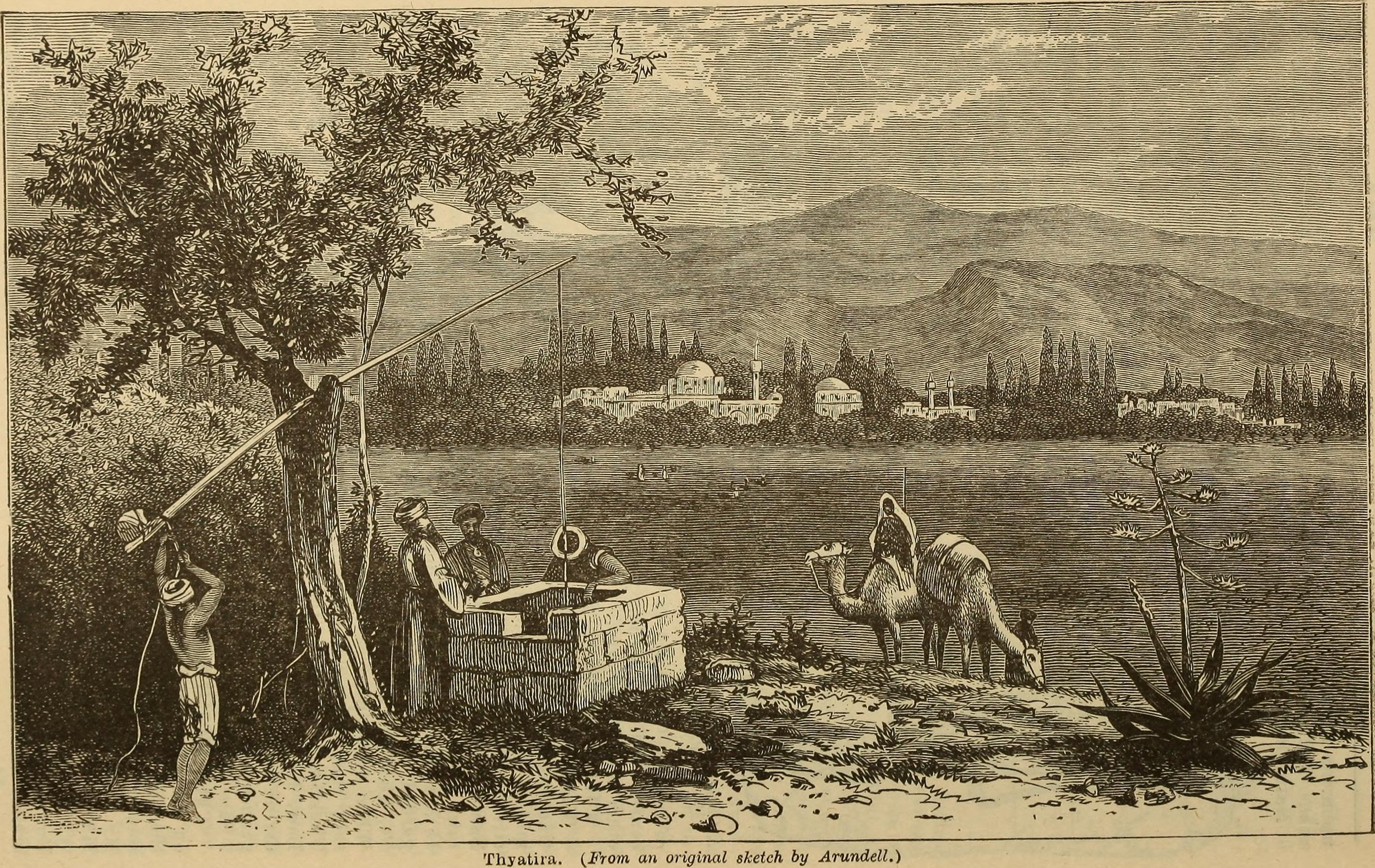
19th-century Thyatira

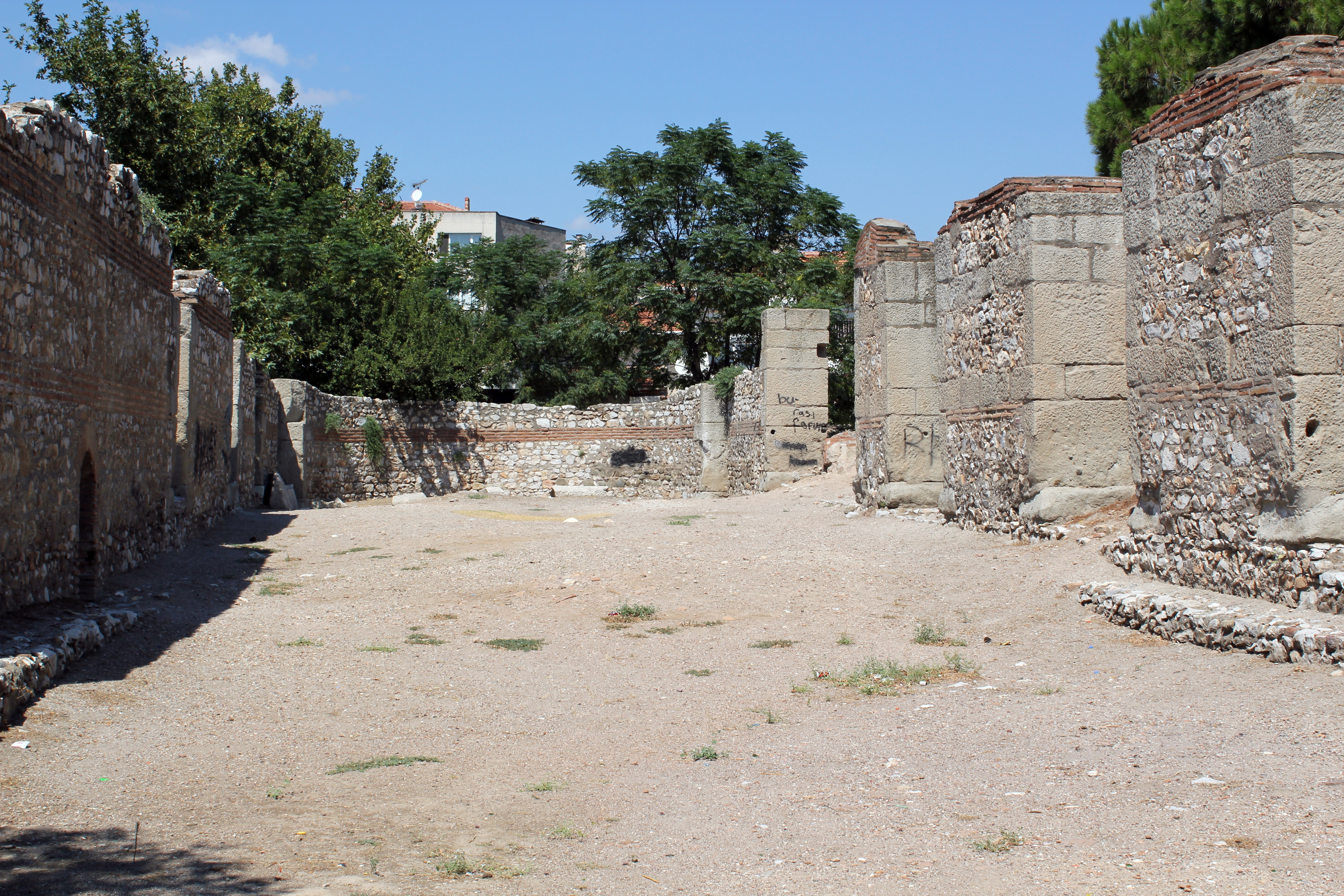
Byzantine basilica of Thyatira

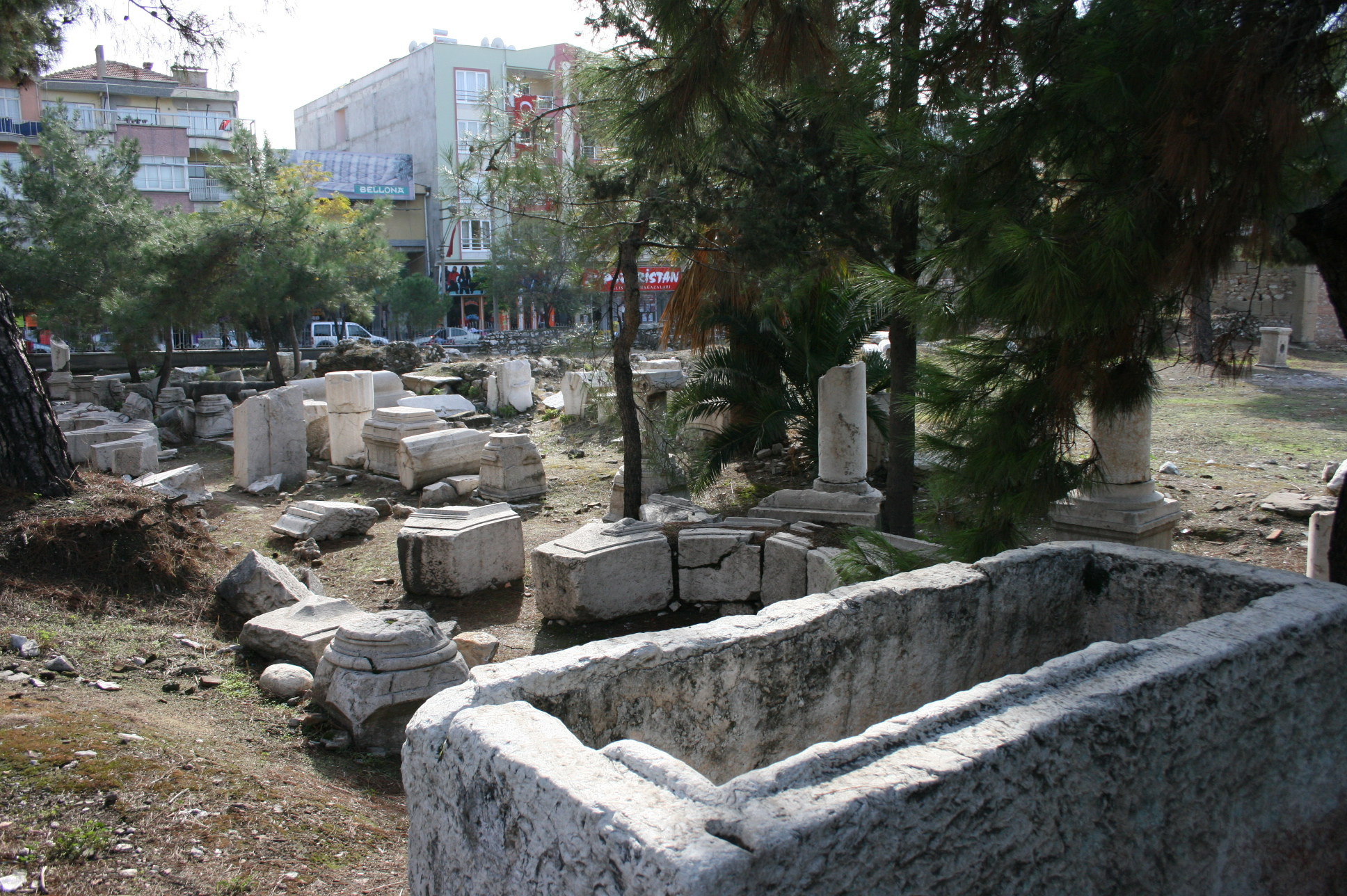
Ruins of the city

== See also ==
- Archdiocese of Thyateira and Great Britain
- List of archbishops of Thyateira and Great Britain
