= St Eleutherius, St Anthia and St Luke the Evangelist =

Greek Orthodox church in London

Coordinates: 51.5567°N 0.0111°W

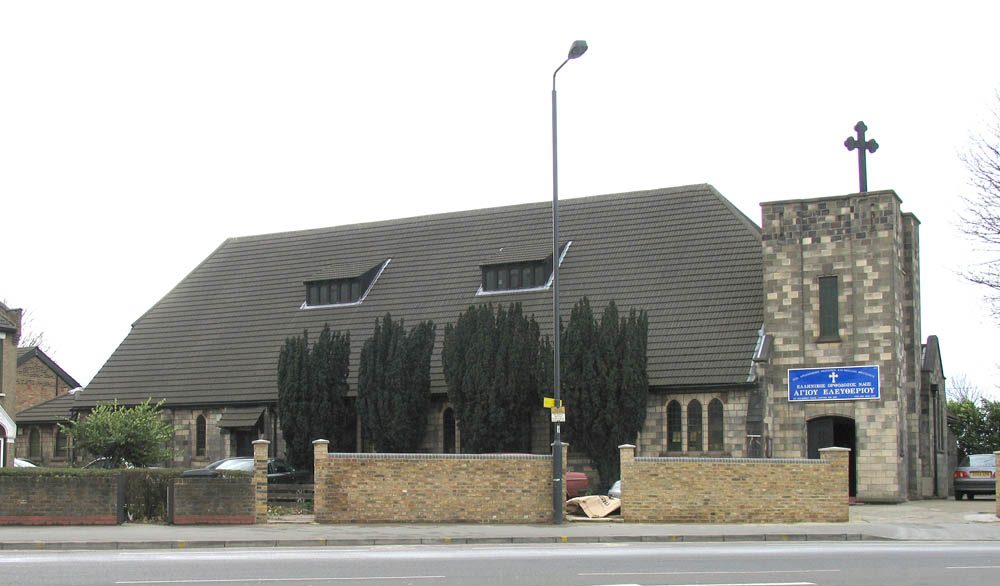
St Eleutherius, St Anthia and St Luke the Evangelist

St Eleutherius, St Anthia and St Luke the Evangelist or the Greek Orthodox Community of St. Eleftherios and St. Luke is a Greek Orthodox church in Leyton, north London. It was founded in 1982 and since March 1984 it has been housed at 113 Ruckholt Road in what was originally St Luke's Church, a Church of England building. It is dedicated to Saints Eleutherius and Antia and Saint Luke.

The Anglican St Luke's was opened as a mission church for Holy Trinity Church, Leyton to serve the furthest western parts of its own parish and of St Catherine's Church, Leyton. Its original iron hall was replaced by a grey terracotta permanent church in 1914, which was granted a new parish in 1932, using parts from those of Holy Trinity and St Mary's. Badly damaged in the London Blitz, the church was restored and continued operating.

The church has been operating a Greek language school for many years, which also observes the major Greek and Cypriot national holidays.
