= Birmingham Orthodox Cathedral =

Greek Orthodox Cathedral of the Dormition of Theotokos & Saint Andrew, Birmingham
- Cathedral Church of the Dormition of the Mother of God and St. Andrew
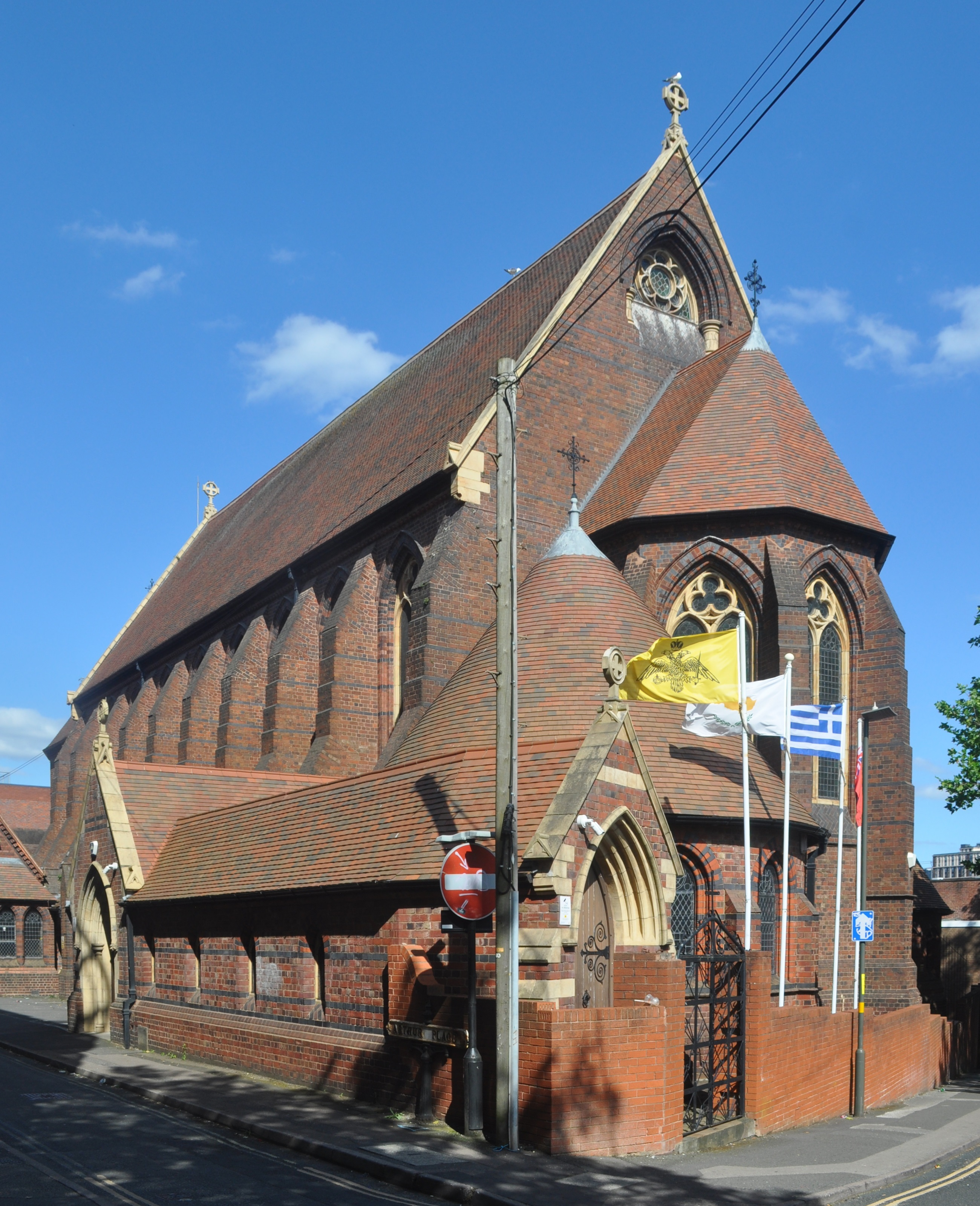
- The cathedral in August 2024
- Greek Orthodox Cathedral of the Dormition of Theotokos & Saint Andrew, Birmingham
- 52°28′58″N 1°54′52″W
- OS grid reference: SP 05922 87205
- Location: 8 Arthur Place, Summer Hill Terrace, Birmingham B1 3DA
- Country: England
- Denomination: Greek Orthodox
- Website: orthandrew.co.uk

Architecture
- Architect: J.A. Chatwin
- Style: Early English Gothic Revival
- Years built: 1873

The Cathedral Church of the Dormition of the Mother of God and St. Andrew (Greek: Καθεδρικός Ναός της Κοιμήσεως της Θεοτόκου και Αποστόλου Ανδρέα) is a Greek Orthodox cathedral on Summer Hill Terrace in Birmingham, England, dedicated to the Dormition of the Theotokos and St Andreas. In 1958 the first Greek Orthodox Church in Birmingham was inaugurated. Regular liturgies began in Birmingham conducted by the first permanent priest, Father Nicodemos Anagnostou.

The building was formerly a Catholic Apostolic church. It was designed in 1873 by J.A. Chatwin, who worked on many of Birmingham's churches, including St Philip's Cathedral, Birmingham. It is a brick Gothic Revival church in the Early English style. It has a wide rectangular nave, an apse at each end and passage aisles through the buttresses. The interior consists of heavy brick arches on stout columns and clerestory windows between clustered wall shafts supporting a high arched roof. The west end has a tall archway set in a diapered brick wall leading into a baptistery. Some of the decoration was by Gibbs and Canning of Tamworth. Renovations have taken place since circa 2000. The priest is Protopresbyter Kosmas Pavlidis.

The cathedral also has a Greek school for children and adults who wish to learn the Greek language and culture. There is more information below in the section Apostolos Andreas Greek School.

== History ==
By the beginning of the twentieth century, there were Greek Orthodox communities and churches in Manchester, Liverpool and Cardiff, as well as in London. In Birmingham, the foundations for a Greek Orthodox church started immediately after the end of the Second World War. From the beginning of the century, large numbers of Greek Cypriots began to emigrate to Britain in search of a better quality of life. They came mainly to the large cities where it was easier to find work.

By 1947, there were enough Greek Orthodox people in Birmingham, and the then Archbishop of Thyateira began sending a priest once a month to conduct the liturgy in a church hall next to a Protestant church in Pershore Road. On the remaining Sundays of the month, the Greek Orthodox residents of the Birmingham area would go to churches in London and Manchester to follow the liturgy.

The congregations grew steadily over the next few years, and in 1951 more regular weekly Sunday liturgies began at the Anglican Church of Saint James in Edgbaston. The Orthodox liturgy would begin after the end of the Protestant service, It was during this period that the first Greek school was opened. Lessons would be conducted in a room over the cafe of Mr Andreas Constantinou.

The Archbishop of Thyateira, Virvos, advised the small community to start organising itself so that more funds could be raised. Mr Andreas Constantinou was one of the first Cypriot inhabitants of Birmingham, and his cafe was a popular meeting place with many of the Greeks of the city. A friend of his father in law had recently arrived from Cyprus. His name was John Efstathiades.

Mr Efstathiades had been a warden of his village church in Cyprus for many years, and he was in a position to help. Even though he was in his 70s, Mr Efstathiades together with Andreas Constantinou, George Sergiou, Christos Christophorides, George Apeches, Michael Angelides, Michael Epifaniou and others began working hard to secure a permanent building for a Greek Orthodox church in Birmingham. They approached all the Greek inhabitants of the area for help so that the most essential church artefacts, such as icons, an Iconostasis and a Holy Bible, could be bought.

They also went to the Anglican Rector of Birmingham, the Rev. Bryan Green for help. He informed them of four empty churches in and around the city, and the most suitable was the church at Arthur Place near the centre of the city.

So in 1958 the first Greek Orthodox Church in Birmingham was inaugurated. The church was devoted to the Dormition of the Virgin Mary and Saint Andrew. Regular liturgies began in Birmingham conducted by the first permanent priest, Father Nicodemos Anagnostou.

== Consecration as a Cathedral ==
On 14 December 1980 Irineos of Patara Birmingham, assistant of the Archdiocese of Great Britain and Thyateira, who had served as Archimandrite in the Church, was ordained as bishop. The ordination was presided over by Archbishop Methodios of Thyateira and Great Britain (Ecumenical Patriarchate) in concelebration with Metropolitan Anthony Bloom and Bishops Gregorios of Tropaion, Chrysostomos of Kyanea and Christophoros of Telmissos.

As the seat of the new bishop, the church was subsequently consecrated as The Cathedral of The Dormition of The Theotokos and St. Andreas.

Bishop Irinaios died on 19 December 2009. He is buried at Oropos Monastery near Athens, where he spent his final years following his retirement.

== Apostolos Andreas Greek School ==
The Apostolos Andreas Greek School in Birmingham was founded in 1958. It was initially housed in a traditional Greek coffee shop (kafeneio) owned by Andreas and Margarita Konstantinou in Lozells. Later on, the school moved to the premises of the church of The Dormition of the Theotokos & Apostolos Andreas. In the early 60s, the number of students increased significantly due to the influx of Cypriot immigrant families. The rooms of a British school in the area were rented out so that over 260 students could be accommodated.

For about the next 40 years, the school was housed in various British schools in the City of Birmingham and in rooms behind the church, used temporarily. On 23 November 2002 the inauguration of the new building took place in the presence of Archbishop Grigorios. Since then, the school has been housed next to the church, in its own separate premises.

A great number of important people and teachers have joined the school over the years. One of the most pre-eminent was Bishop Irinaios, who served for over 30 years and also became the school's Headmaster.

Christophoros Cartoudis taught at the school from 1961 and later served as its headmaster. During his tenure, he taught several generations of students, including the grandchildren of former pupils. In recognition of his contributions to the school and to the Greek language, Cartoudis was awarded the British Empire Medal in the Birthday Honours of 2014 by Her Majesty The Queen.

In 1995 our school became an examination centre, hosting students from various schools every year.

For the past 10 years, the Cypriot Ministry of Education has been appointing teachers to Greek Schools throughout the UK through the Cyprus Educational Mission (C.E.M). Our school's Deputies appointed by the CEM were Maria Genari, Gianna Andreou, Christina Christodoulou, Mattheos Venetsanos, and Panagiota Magou, the current Headteacher.

The school is also a member of the National Resource Centre for Supplementary Education (NRCSE).

As years go by, the school's educational vision and values remain the same; teaching the students about the Greek language, history, religion, and culture to help them take pride in themselves and their roots.

== Gallery ==
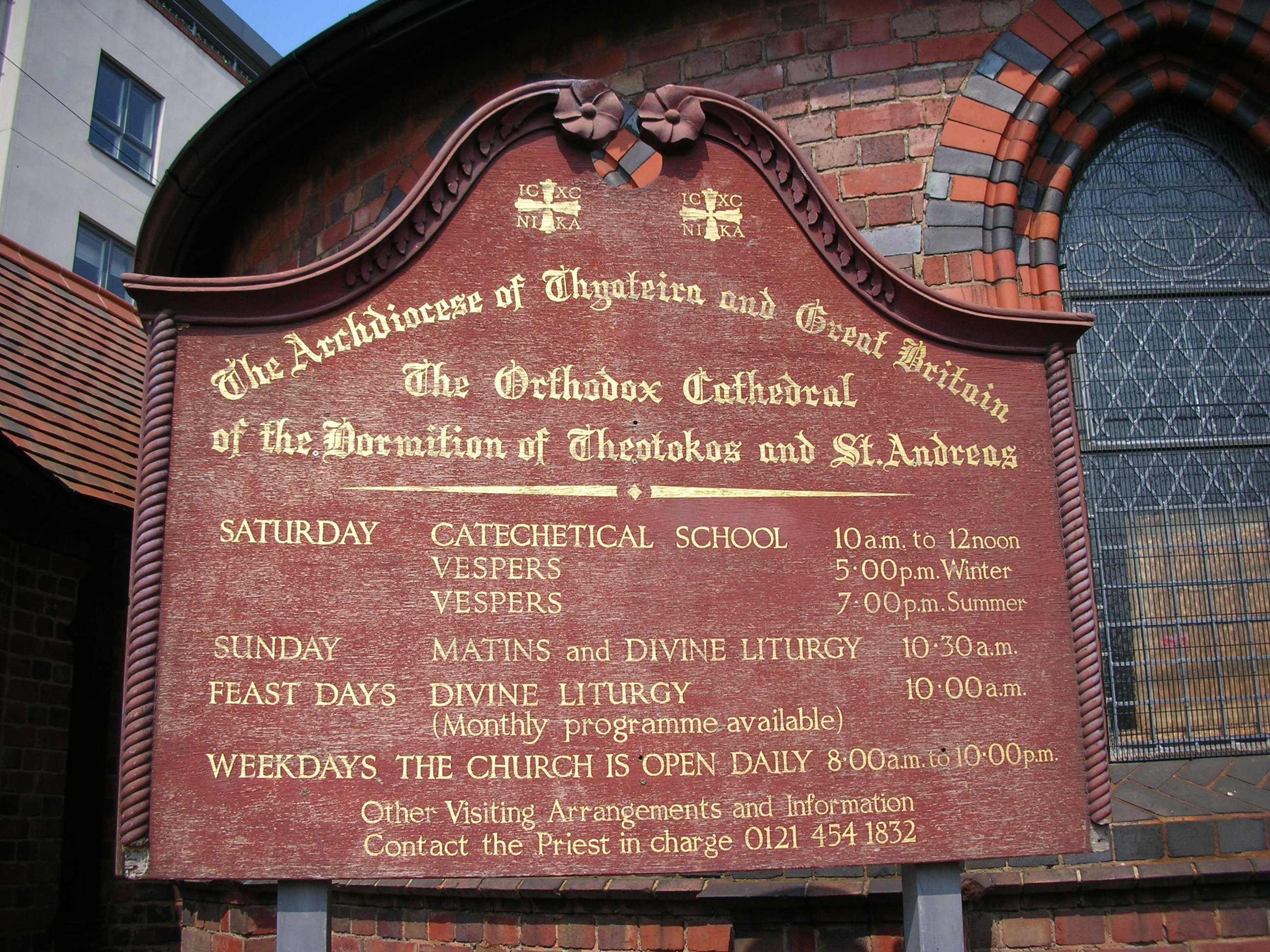
Cathedral sign

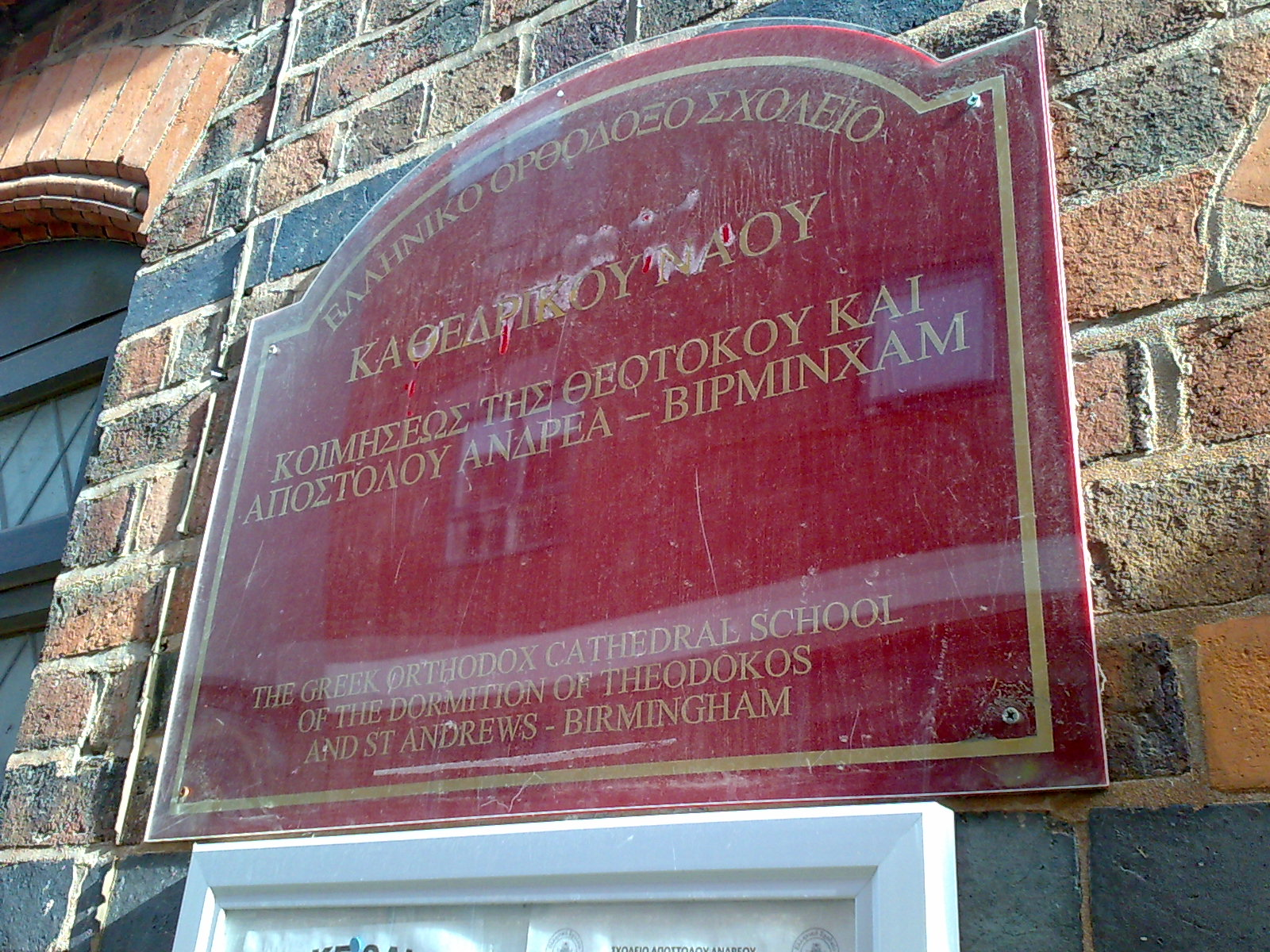
The Cathedral School

== See also ==
- St Philip's (Church of England)
- St Chad's (Catholic)
- Church of the Holy Prince Lazar, Birmingham (Serbian Orthodox)
- Archdiocese of Thyateira and Great Britain
