= Dormition Cathedral, London =

Russian Orthodox cathedral in London

Cathedral of the Dormition of the Mother of God and All Saints
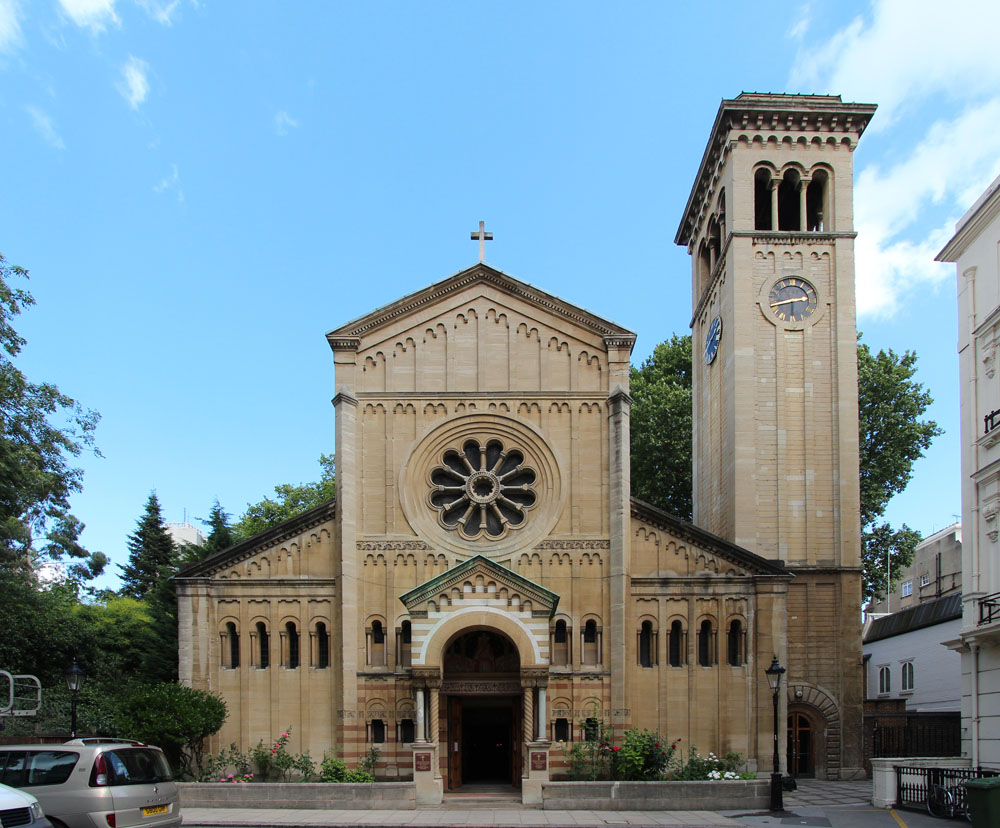
- The façade of the cathedral

Religion
- Affiliation: Russian Orthodox Church (Moscow Patriarchate)
- Ecclesiastical or organizational status: Cathedral
- Leadership: archbishop: Matthew (Andreev), Archpriest: Fr Maxim Nikolsky, Fr Joseph Skinner deacon: Vadim Santsevich

Location
- Location: 67 Ennismore Gardens, Knightsbridge, London SW7 1NH
- Interactive map of Cathedral of the Dormition of the Mother of God and All Saints
- Coordinates: 51.5006°N 0.1693°W

Architecture
- Style: Lombard architecture

Website
- www.sourozh.org

The Russian Orthodox Cathedral of the Dormition of the Mother of God and All Saints is the cathedral of the Russian Orthodox Diocese of Sourozh.

It holds the diocese's administrative meetings as well as weekly, seasonal and special services. Its building is the Victorian former church of a wealthy parish of its era that faces the north-east green of Ennismore Gardens, Knightsbridge, London, England. The main (western) façade is a very close copy of that of the Basilica of San Zeno, Verona, in Verona, Italy since remodelling in 1891.

Its interior is largely unchanged from that of its Anglican forebear church built, which was built in 1848–1849. The architect was Lewis Vulliamy.

== History ==
=== Anglican church ===
The building was erected as an Anglican Church to All Saints. Architect Lewis Vulliamy proposed to build a church in Lombard style instead of conventional Gothic style. His full vision could not be realized for lack of finance.

Consecration of the church took place in July 1849. It became a parish spanning outside much of Hyde Park: in the west Kensington Palace and about 20 houses beyond and a more populous strip to the south. It is shown almost all as in the upper 3 of the 7 categories of wealth of Booth's poverty map at the end of the century.

In 1860, architect R. L. Roumieu completed the construction of the bell tower from the draft designs of Vulliamy, at 36.5 meters. The first interior decoration was by Thomas R. Spence. The current forms including sgraffito and stained glass windows are by Heywood Sumner. Since reconstruction in 1891–1892, the western façade has borne a very close resemblance to the Basilica of St Zeno of Verona.

In 1871, the vicar lived at 29 Elvaston Place. In 1924, a house for the church's priest was built on a very small square plot against the southern edge of its land: 66 Ennismore Gardens, Church House.

=== Transfer ===
In 1955, the Anglican parish was merged in such a way that the Church of the Holy Trinity on Prince Consort Road to the west became the parish church of the new parish. The church was let for the use of the Russian Orthodox faith, a trust having been set up in 1944. The building was consecrated as an Orthodox Church in December 1956 in honour of the Dormition of the Mother of God.

=== Russian Orthodox church ===
In 1978 it was purchased by the Sourozh diocese, without funds from the Moscow Patriarchate. Over time, including the tenure of Metropolitan Anthony (d. 2003), the parish gained multinational congregants.

In 2006, a substantial part of the clergy and laity, headed by Bishop Basil (Osborne), Administrator of the Diocese, decided to leave the Moscow Patriarchate. In June 2007 the Parish Council of the Cathedral voted to place the Cathedral under the Episcopal Vicariate headed by Bishop Basil. This was challenged by the Moscow Patriarchate and in 2009 the High Court decided, on the wording of the 1944 Trust Deed of the Cathedral, that it should remain with the adherents of the Moscow Patriarchate.

== Priors ==
- Metropolitan Anthony (Bloom) (1956–2002)
- Archpriest John Lee (2002–2003)
- Bishop Basil (Osborne) (2003–2006)
- Archbishop Innocent (Vasiliev) (2006–2007)
- Archbishop Elisey (Ganaba) (2007–2017)

== Gallery ==
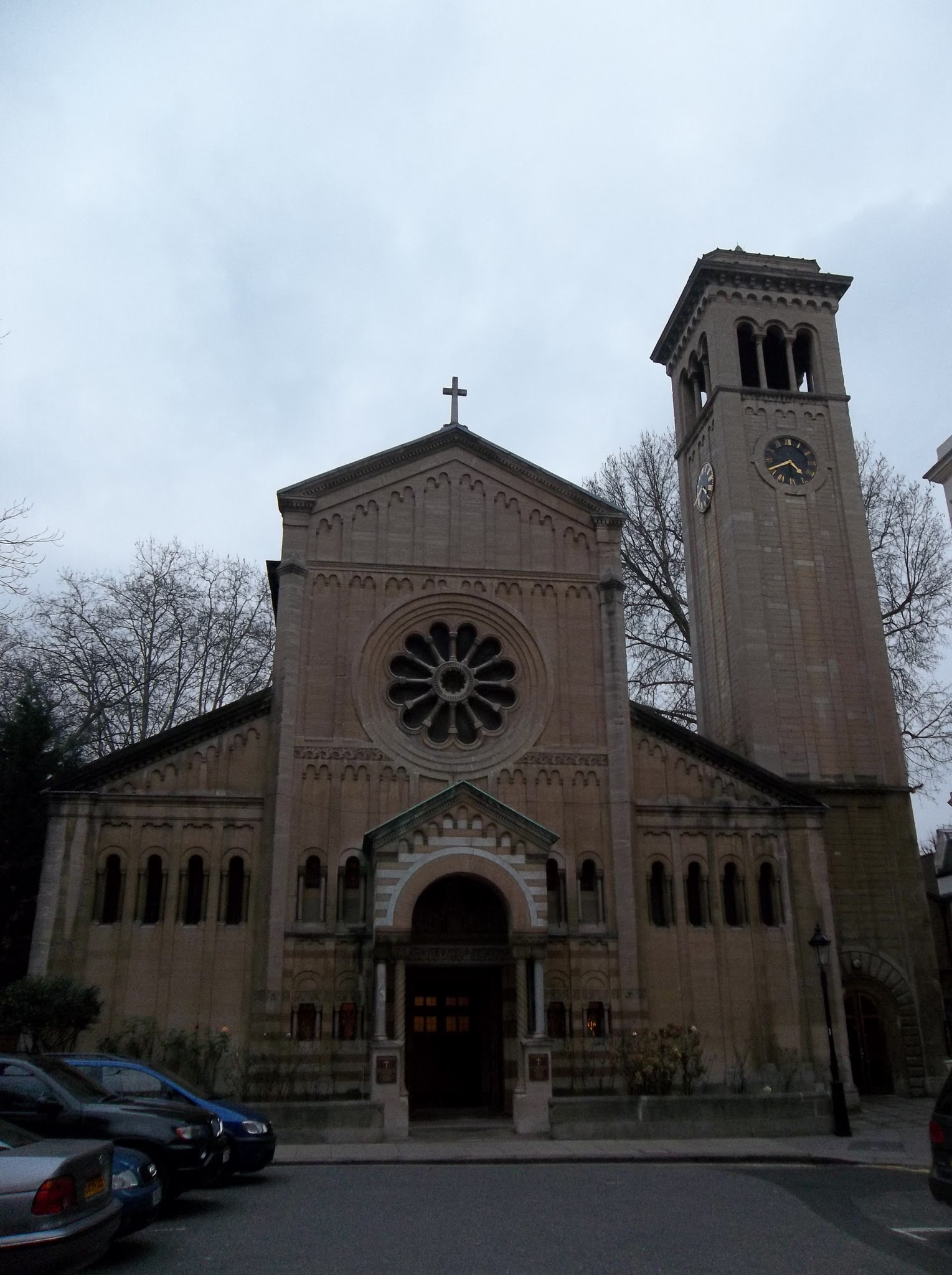

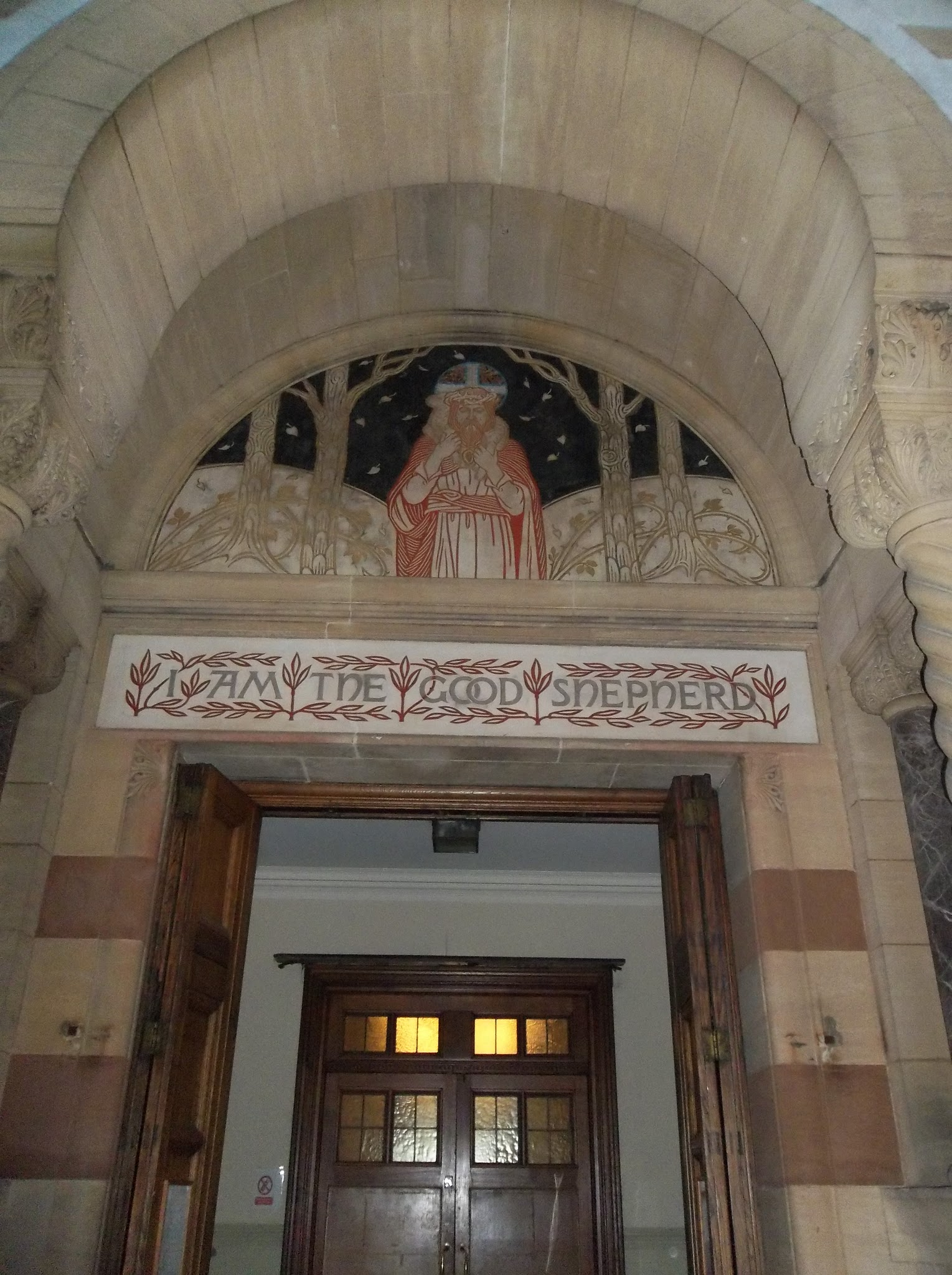

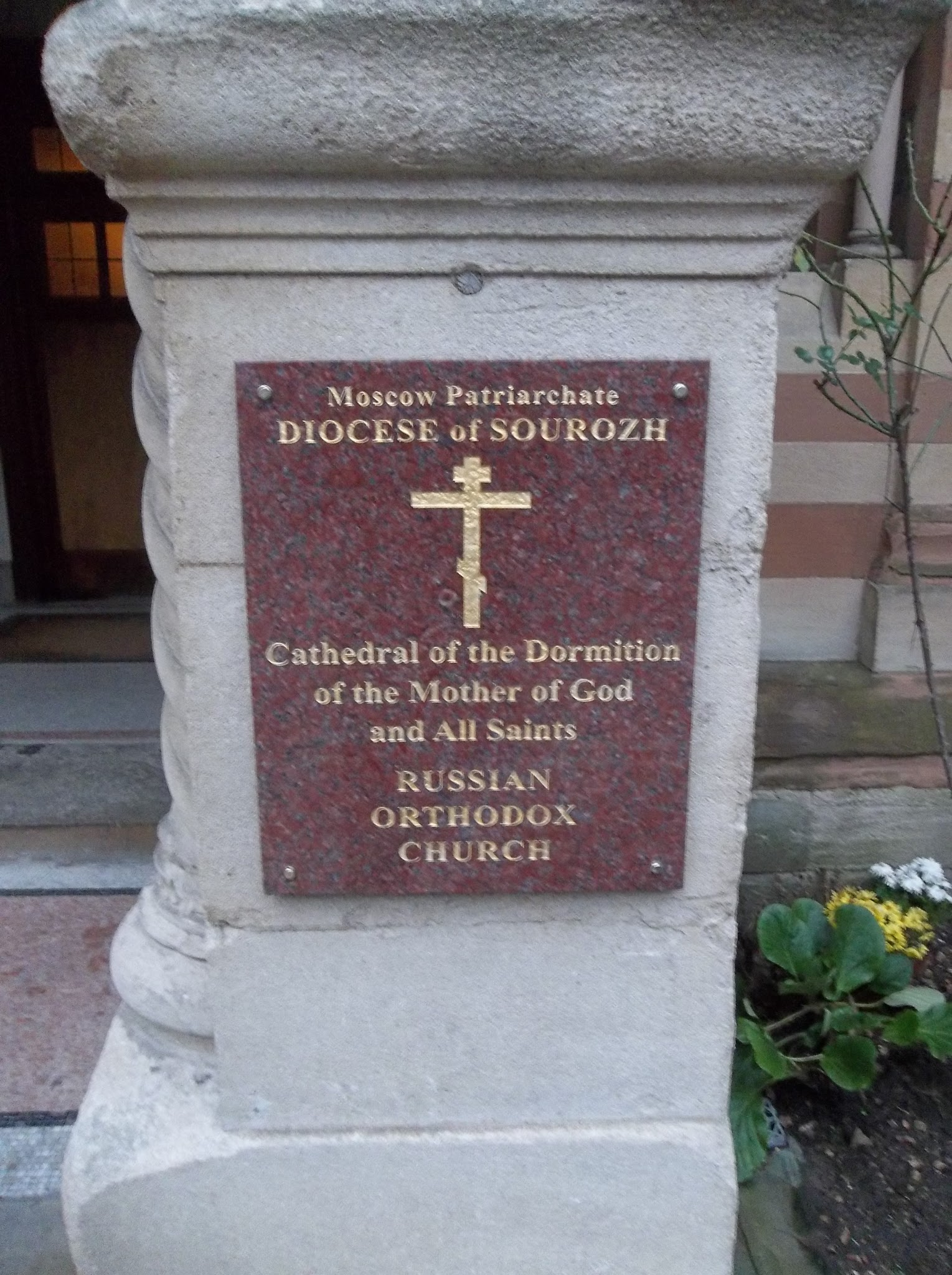

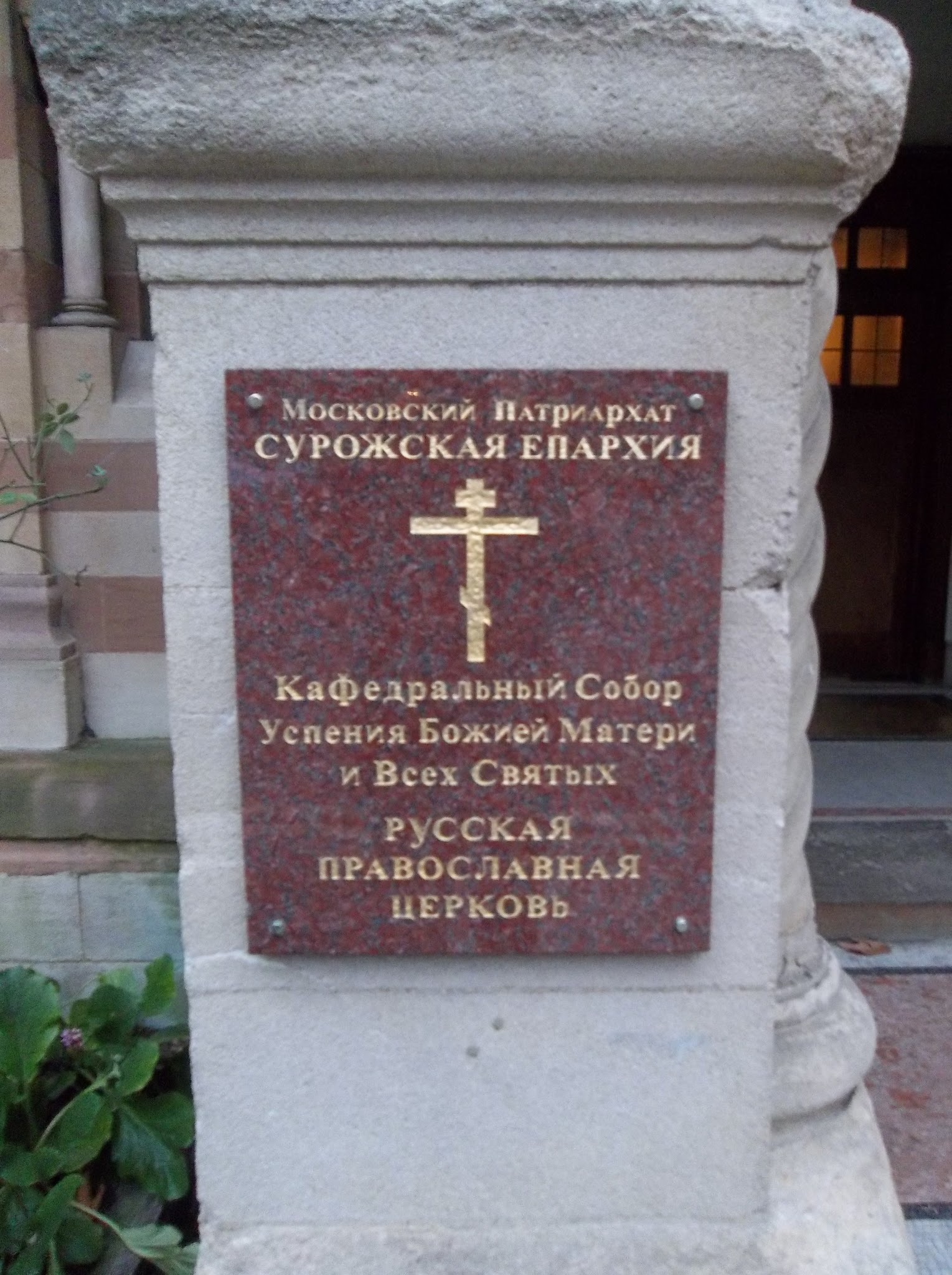
