= Russian Orthodox Diocese of Sourozh =

Diocese of Russian Orthodox Church in Great Britain

Diocese of Sourozh
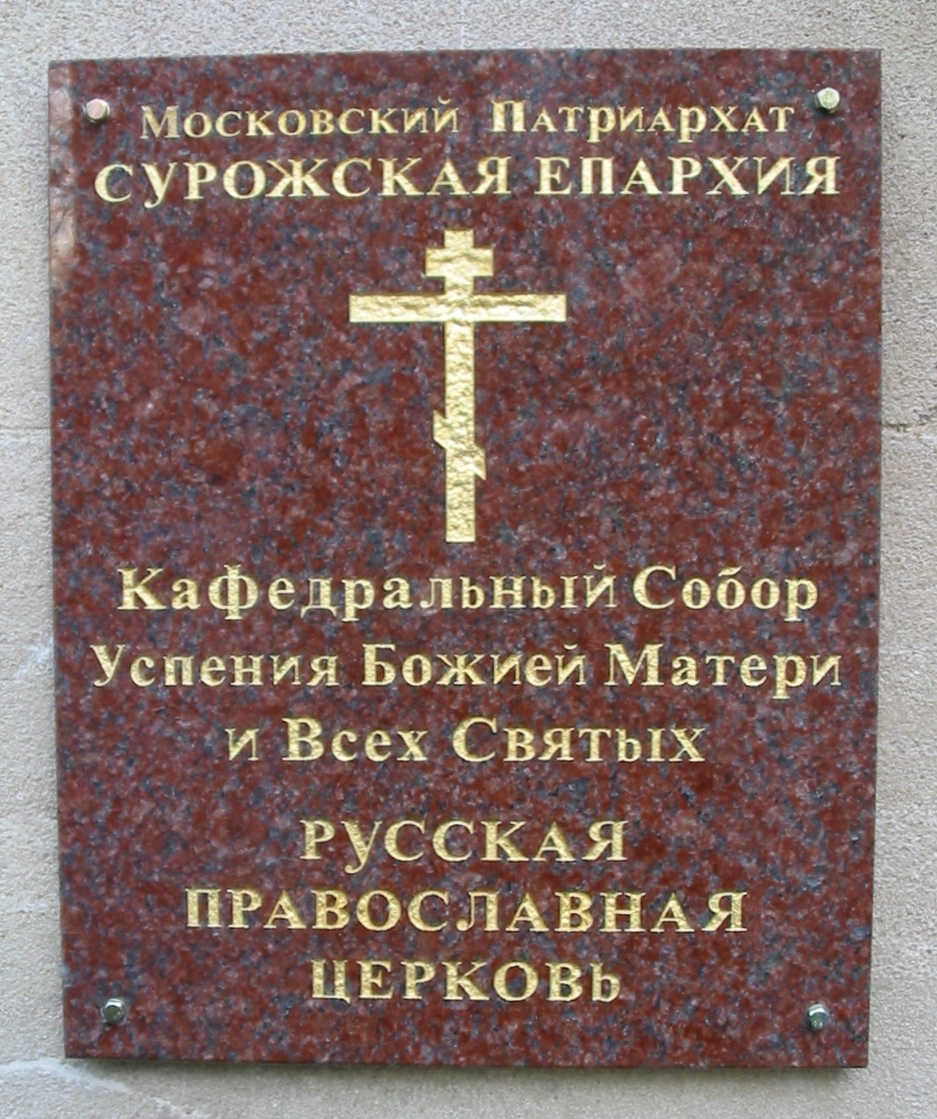
- Plaque at the Russian Orthodox Patriarchial Church of the Assumption and All Saints

Location
- Territory: United Kingdom; Ireland
- Ecclesiastical province: Patriarchal Exarchate in Western Europe (Moscow Patriarchate)
- Metropolitan: Anthony (Sevryuk)

Statistics
- Parishes: 58 (44 parishes + 14 diocesan communities)

Information
- Denomination: Eastern Orthodox Church
- Rite: Byzantine
- Established: 10 October 1962

Current leadership
- Parent church: Russian Orthodox Church
- Bishop of Sourozh: Matthew (Andreyev)

Website
- www.sourozh.org

The Russian Orthodox Diocese of Sourozh (Russian: Суро́жская епа́рхия, romanized: Surózhskaya yepárkhiya) is a diocese of the Russian Orthodox Church (ROC), covering the islands of Great Britain and Ireland. Since 28 December 2018, the Diocese of Sourozh is part of the Patriarchal Exarchate in Western Europe.

The diocese's name is taken from an ancient see in Crimea that no longer has a bishop. The patron saint of the diocese is St Stephen of Sourozh, an eighth-century Archbishop of Sourozh (today Sudak) and Confessor of the Faith during the Iconoclastic Controversy.

Founded in October 1962, the diocese was headed by Metropolitan Anthony (Bloom) until his death in 2003.

Since the adoption of its new statutes in 2010, the diocese was placed under the direct and personal spiritual and administrative authority of the Patriarch of Moscow and All Russia.

== History ==
=== Origins of the diocese ===
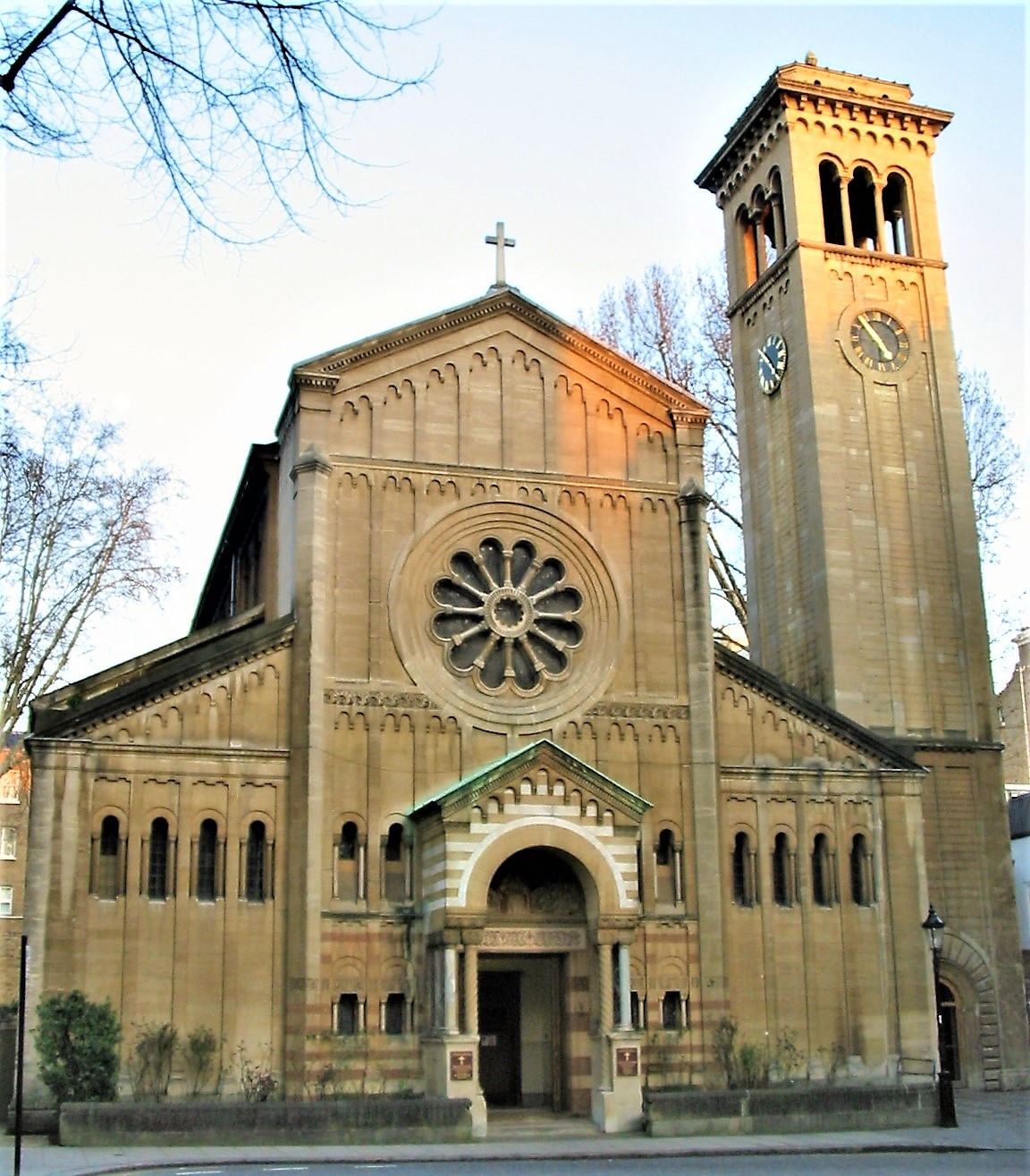
Russian Orthodox Patriarchial Church of The Assumption and All Saints

The origins of the Diocese of Sourozh lie in the Parish of the Dormition in London, which from 1716 existed as the Russian Embassy Church. In that year, Archimandrite Gennadius rented a house in Exchange Court, an alley leading off the Strand and converted the large drawing room into a church. The Anglican Bishop of London, John Robinson, agreed to allow Orthodox worship at the church, with the stipulation that the services remained private, that English people were excluded and that singing should not be loud "lest common crowds cause any harm". The first service was held in November 1716 on the Feast of the Presentation of Mary. Although small, the congregation included Russian diplomats, and Russian and Greek merchants, there being no Greek church in London until 1838. Over the following century, a dozen English families also joined the church, as did Colonel Philip Ludwell III, a wealthy American colonist who was received into Orthodoxy in 1738. Another notable English member was the linguist John Paradise, a Fellow of the Royal Society.

By 1756, the church had fallen into disrepair, and Exchange Court had degenerated into "a disreputable and shameful place" frequented by prostitutes. Therefore, another large house was rented in Burlington Gardens, again with the drawing room converted for worship. During the Anglo-Russian War (1807–1812), the rector of the church became Russia's sole diplomatic representative in London. The church made a further two moves, in 1784 to Great Portland Street and in 1813 to a large terraced house at 32 Welbeck Street. Here, a chapel was built in the rear of the house on the site of the stables, which was itself rebuilt in the late 1860s and is now a listed building, although no longer a place of Orthodox worship. From 1920, the Anglican church of St Mary-le-Bow in the City of London, allowed the growing Russian congregation to worship there on Sundays and feast days, and in 1921 the Church of England offered a redundant church building, St Philip's, in Buckingham Palace Road, which, like its predecessors, was consecrated as the Church of the Dormition of the Mother of God. In 1955, the site of St Philip's Church was purchased for the construction of an extension to Victoria Coach Station. After long negotiations the parish was offered a disused Anglican church in Knightsbridge, All Saints' Church, Ennismore Gardens, which is now the Dormition Cathedral, London.

The jurisdictional history of the parish in the years following the Russian Revolution is complicated. Immediately following the Russian Revolution the parish was under the jurisdiction of what would become known as the Russian Orthodox Church Outside Russia (ROCOR). In 1926, however, the parish split into those who continued to support ROCOR and those who supported the Moscow Patriarchate. Each group took services in turn. Then, in 1931, the parish was taken into the jurisdiction of the Patriarchate of Constantinople. In 1945 the parish followed its bishop, Metropolitan Evlogii, who wished to move back into the Moscow Patriarchate but on the condition that he would need a release from the Ecumenical Patriarch – which was applied for, but never granted.

In 1948 Hieromonk Anthony (Bloom) was appointed Chaplain of the Anglican-Orthodox Fellowship of Saint Alban and Saint Sergius. On 1 September 1950 Hieromonk Anthony became the Rector of the Russian Parish of the Dormition in London. But by that time, the Parish of the Dormition was not the only Russian Orthodox parish in Great Britain, as a number of other parishes appeared, set up by Russian Orthodox communities. This prompted, in 1957, the formation in Great Britain of the Vicariate of Sergievo of the Exarchate of Western Europe (Moscow Patriarchate), with Hieromonk Anthony now becoming Bishop of Sergievo.

Following this, on 10 October 1962, the Diocese of Sourozh was formed, led by Bishop Anthony of Sergievo, who then became Archbishop Anthony of Sourozh. The Russian Church did not name the diocese after a British territory so as not to upset good relations with the Church of England.

=== Distinctive ethos of the diocese ===
For many years the political situation between Great Britain and the Soviet Union meant that the Diocese of Sourozh was able to function in virtual independence of the Moscow Patriarchate. In those years it developed its own distinctive ethos and liturgical practices. Thus, in contrast to the typical practice of the Russian Orthodox Church, in Sourozh marriages may take place on a Saturday, frequent communion is common, confession is not considered necessary before each communion, fasting rules are observed less strictly than is often the case in the Russian Orthodox Church and women are not required to wear headscarves in church and may wear trousers rather than skirts. Also distinctive of the Sourozh diocese has been the stipulation in its diocesan statutes according to which the Sourozh diocesan assembly has the right to determine what bishops can be appointed to the diocese (it is standard in the Russian Orthodox Church for bishops to be appointed directly by the Holy Synod without necessarily having to consult the diocese in question). These particularities were legitimated within the diocese upon the basis of the decrees of the All-Russian Church Council of 1917–1918, in accordance with which the statutes of the Diocese of Sourozh were written. The Moscow Patriarchate, however, has never formally accepted these statutes, so in legal terms they are in effect without any force.

Throughout its existence, the diocese has remained predominantly located in southern England. It has not expanded substantially into the north of England, Wales, Scotland, Northern Ireland or the Republic of Ireland, though increasing numbers of Russian Orthodox Christians located in these areas of Great Britain and Ireland. The diocese has been centred on the cathedral in London and the Parish in Oxford, with the episcopacy residing in these locations.

The culture of the diocese reflected both the Franco-Russian emigre Orthodoxy in which Metropolitan Anthony had spent many of his formative years, as well as the middle-to-high Anglicanism which formed the ecclesial background of many of the English converts to the diocese. Many in the diocese had a long-term vision of the establishment of an autocephalous (self-governed) Orthodox Church in Great Britain.

Metropolitan Anthony himself maintained links with the Moscow Patriarchate to the end of his life. And whilst the Diocese of Sourozh was numerically far smaller than the Greek Orthodox Archdiocese of Thyateira and Great Britain (the local British Diocese of the Ecumenical Patriarchate), Metropolitan Anthony considered the Diocese of Sourozh to be "the Orthodox Church in Britain" simpliciter, on the grounds that it was open to all and not only to those of a particular ethnic background (as he took the Diocese of Thyateira to be).

However, some traditionalist ROCOR criticised the Sourozh diocese for endorsing "'an Anglican form of Orthodoxy", led by "a small and ageing clique of intellectuals, very much part of one particular, upper middle-class, Western cultural elitist group, one elderly generation".

=== Influx into the diocese after the fall of the Soviet Union ===
With the fall of communism in Russia, a new wave of Russian Orthodox parishioners entered the diocese. Many amongst this group, attending the diocesan cathedral in London, were unhappy at the (for a Russian Church) non-standard practices which prevailed in the diocese, and sought to bring its liturgical practices and ethos into line with the standard practice of the Russian Orthodox Church. For the supporters of such change, this amounted to 'normalisation'; for its opponents, it constituted Russification.

It has been alleged by British ROCOR clergy that the diocese of Sourozh failed to expand to meet the spiritual needs of newly arrived Orthodox Christians from Russia who lived in areas of the United Kingdom in which the diocese did not have parishes or communities. Such allegations have been confirmed by the commission of the Holy Synod, which has concluded that in recent years "there were not enough Russian-speaking priests in the parish to celebrate services and, in particular, to confess, that English was gradually used more and more as a liturgical language, and that this was disproportionate to the actual number of English people at the Cathedral".

=== Tensions ===
The diocese's history with its hierarchs, and the relations between those hierarchs, have at times been tumultuous, with bishops Hilarion (Alfeyev) being moved away from the diocese, and Basil (Osborne) leaving the Russian Orthodox Patriarchate to join the Ecumenical Patriarchate of Constantinople. Metropolitan Anthony had spoken about, and sometimes become involved in, these tensions. These often related to jurisdictional disputes, neglect of country parishes, or to the rift between pro-Moscow laity and those who advanced the ideal of an autocephalous Orthodox church in Great Britain.

=== Bishop Basil's departure to Constantinople ===
In January 2002, Hilarion (Alfeyev) was consecrated Bishop of Kerch as an assistant bishop for the Sourozh diocese, assuming the title previously held by Archbishop Anatoly who was sent into retirement for the purpose. According to the Russian Orthodox Church, initially, Bishop Hilarion was well accepted by the diocese as a whole. But soon, Bishop Basil and others in the diocese claimed that Bishop Hilarion was, on the direction of senior clergy in the ROC, undermining Metropolitan Anthony in order to increase the ROC's control over the diocese. Suspicions were voiced regarding the manner of Bishop Hilarion's appointment and the manner of his leadership following his appointment. Bishop Hilarion later named those whom he took to be the leaders of this group: Bishop Basil of Sergievo, Archpriest Sergei Hackel, Priest Alexander Fostiropoulos, and Irina Kirillova.

Metropolitan Anthony's opposition to the group seeking to undermine and destroy the Diocese of Sourozh is forcefully expressed in an address he made to his London Parish on 12 December 2002 which has been recorded.

During this period, Bishop Basil and others began to suggest that, should relations with the Moscow Patriarchate worsen, then the members of the Diocese of Sourozh would change jurisdiction by leaving the Russian Orthodox Church and joining the Ecumenical Patriarchate. Subsequently, Bishop Basil also claimed that, with the full knowledge of Metropolitan Anthony, 'letters of dismissal' were prepared for clergy of the Diocese of Sourozh, to enable them to transfer out of the diocese to another jurisdiction. However, several of the closest and most trusted assistants of Metropolitan Anthony claim to have had no knowledge of this.

On 24 April 2006, Bishop Basil decided to write to the Patriarch of Moscow asking that he, and those who wished to follow him, be released from the jurisdiction of the Moscow Patriarchate that they may be received into the Patriarchate of Constantinople. On 9 May 2006, Patriarch Alexy II issued a decree saying Osborne was relieved of his duties as administrator of the Diocese of Sourozh. On 8 June 2006, the Holy Synod of the Ecumenical Patriarchate responded to Bishop Basil's appeal. The synod unanimously agreed to receive Bishop Basil, giving him the new title of Bishop of Amphipolis. As Bishop of Amphipolis, Osborne was appointed assistant bishop within the Ecumenical Patriarchate's Archdiocese of Parishes of the Russian Tradition in Western Europe (i.e. the 'Exarchate'), under the headship of Archbishop Gabriel of Comana. In his brief time as assistant bishop in the Exarchate, Basil's authority was over a newly formed vicariate of parishes in the British Isles who had followed him in his departure from the Russian Orthodox Church into the Ecumenical Patriarchate. This body was given the title Episcopal Vicariate of Great Britain and Ireland, and consisted of some twelve parishes and some smaller Eucharistic Communities.

In March 2007, negotiations took place in Geneva between representatives of the two patriarchates (Moscow and Constantinople). These concluded with the Holy Synod of the Moscow Patriarchate releasing Osborne from its jurisdiction on 27 March. Commenting to the media on the synod's decision, Metropolitan Kyrill of Smolensk and Kaliningrad, chairman of the Moscow Patriarchate's Department of External Church Relations, said that "The problem arose because Bishop Basil went over to Constantinople without any request from Constantinople and without any consent from the Moscow Patriarchate. Now Constantinople has requested his documents, which customarily include a letter of release. This means that the Moscow Patriarchate has granted Bishop Basil a canonical leave."

== Recent events ==
=== Fiftieth anniversary celebrations of the cathedral ===
On 15 October 2006 the Diocese of Sourozh celebrated the fiftieth anniversary of the consecration of the Cathedral of the Dormition of the Mother of God and all Saints. Joining the Diocese for this special event were Metropolitan Kirill of Smolensk and Kaliningrad, Archbishop Gregorios Theocharous of Thyateira, Archbishop Theophan Galinsky of Berlin and Germany, as well as Bishop Hilarion Alfeyev.

In his message to the faithful of the diocese for that occasion, Patriarch Alexy of Moscow and All Russia stressed that the cathedral is home to a "'multitudinous and multilingual flock", and that this is quite proper for the Church, being "a single body made up of many and dissimilar members, filled with one Spirit". Alexy exhorted the members of the diocese to 'bear one another's burdens and so fulfil the law of Christ" (Gal. 6:2). He hoped that the celebrations would contribute to the "healing" of the "wounds" inflicted upon the diocese in recent times.

=== Consecration of Bishop Elisey of Bogorodsk ===
On 26 November 2006, Archimandrite Elisey (Ganaba) was consecrated Bishop of Bogorodsk at the Cathedral of Christ the Saviour in Moscow, to be assistant bishop to Archbishop Innocent of Korsun, with pastoral responsibility for the Diocese of Sourozh.

At his consecration, Patriarch Alexy II of Moscow and all Russia laid upon him three tasks.

- 'First of all, above all other tasks, however great and urgent they may be', Bishop Elisey is to 'face the daily and unceasing task of caring for each child of God, for whom Christ died'.
- Secondly, Bishop Elisey is 'to witness to the truth of the Orthodox faith before all the peoples of the West, working to strengthen it, with the ultimate aim of reuniting all in the One, Holy, and Apostolic Church'.
- Thirdly, Bishop Elisey is 'to give spiritual support' to Russians ('our compatriots') who 'now live in Great Britain'.

=== Wonderworking icon brought by the diocese to Great Britain ===
The Derzhavnaya (Reigning) Icon of the Mother of God was brought to Britain by the Diocese of Sourozh in September 2007 with the stated blessing of Patriarch Alexy.

=== Bishop Elisey appointed as Bishop of Sourozh ===
On 27 December 2007 the Holy Synod appointed Bishop Elisey as Bishop of Sourozh, bringing to an end the Temporary Administration of Archbishop Innocent, who was thanked for having restored peace to the Diocese.

=== Matthew as diocesan bishop ===
By the decision of the Holy Synod of the Russian Orthodox Church of 28 December 2017, Archbishop Elisey of Sourozh was relieved of the administration of the Diocese of Sourozh and appointed Archbishop of The Hague and the Netherlands. In the same decision, Matthew (Andreev) of Bogorodsk was relieved of his duties as Administrator of the parishes of the Moscow Patriarchate in Italy and appointed as ruling Bishop of the diocese of Sourozh.

=== Patriarchal Exarchate in Western Europe ===
Since 28 December 2018, the Diocese of Sourozh is part of the Patriarchal Exarchate in Western Europe.

== Ruling bishops ==
- Anthony of Sourozh (10 October 1962-mid 2003)
- Basil of Sergievo (August 2003-9 May 2006)
- Innocent (Vasiliev) (May 2006-27 December 2007) locum tenens
- Elisey (Ganaba) (27 December 2007 – 28 December 2017)
- Matthew (Andreev) (28 December 2017-)

On 6 October 2006, the Holy Synod of the ROC announced that Archimandrite Elisey (Ganaba), head of the Russian Spiritual Mission in Jerusalem, was to be consecrated Bishop of Bogorodsk, assistant bishop of the Diocese of Korsun, with responsibility for the administration of the Diocese of Sourozh.

== See also ==
- Russian Orthodox Diocese of Great Britain and Western Europe
- Assembly of Canonical Orthodox Bishops of Great Britain and Ireland
