= Society of the Faith =

The Society of the Faith is a Church of England charity founded in 1905. Its objects are to bring together Christians in communion with the See of Canterbury for mutual assistance, and to support and further charitable undertakings, particularly those that popularise the Catholic faith. It is registered with the Charity Commission.

== History ==
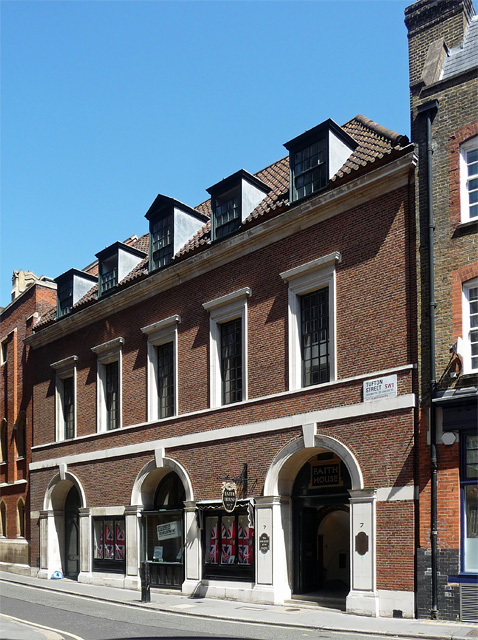
Faith House, Tufton Street, Westminster

The society was founded in August 1905, by two brothers, the Revd Canon John Albert Douglas, then Vicar of St Luke, Camberwell, and the Revd Charles Edward Douglas, both notable figures in the Anglo-Catholic revival. The object of the society was to create:

"an Association of Christians in communion with the See of Canterbury for mutual assistance in the work of Christ's Church and for the furtherance of such charitable undertakings as may from time to time be decided upon, more especially for the popularisation of the Catholic faith."

The Douglas brothers also intended to create a collegiate institution with resident and non-resident members, but this never came into being.

In 1926 the society became a charitable limited company. In 1935, it took on the lease of Faith House, 7 Tufton Street in Westminster, which provided a base for activities of the society, in particular a bookshop for the Faith Press and workspaces for Faith-Craft (see below). Faith House, designed by Edwin Lutyens, had been built in 1905–07 as a church institute for St John's, Smith Square. The building has been described as a version of an Italianate palazzo, reinterpreted in a Georgian style. The vaulted, central room has occasionally been used as a concert space since the 1930s.

== Faith Press ==
The Revd C. E. Douglas had the idea of encouraging attendance at Sunday School by a system of stamp collecting. The stamps were originally printed in London. Douglas moved the enterprise to Leighton Buzzard in Bedfordshire, where a local printer, Henry Rutherford, began producing the stamps. This was so successful that in July 1907 the Faith Press was founded, at first in a converted cow-shed behind a pub, but from 1910 in a converted brewery in Leighton Buzzard.

In 1909 the Manchester-based "Church Printing Company" was taken over by the society and run as the Manchester Faith Press. It closed in 1921 as a consequence of the post-First World War depression.

The main company flourished, and became a limited liability company in 1913. As well as the "stamps" it published religious books, various periodicals and from 1917 church music. From 1915 a parish insert called "The Symbol" was printed, to provide Anglo-Catholic priests with good material for sermons and other instructions. The London offices of the press were at 22, Buckingham Street, Charing Cross; they were later moved to 7, Tufton Street, Westminster, SW1.

Rising costs and reduced demand led to Faith Press being closed down in 1973.

== Faith-Craft Studio ==
In 1916 the society began to make vestments to order. The business grew and in 1921 Faith-Craft was founded. From 1938 a workshop for joinery and statue work was opened in St Albans, Hertfordshire, with vestments and stained-glass being produced at Faith House. In 1955 Faith-Craft works moved to new premises in the Abbey Mill in St Albans. The post-war restoration and furnishing of St Mary-le-Bow, Cheapside from 1956 to 1964 was Faith-Craft's largest single commission; everything was made by Faith-Craft including the stained glass windows, designed by John Hayward. By the end of the 1960s changes in fashions in church furnishings had changed, reducing demand and the costs of running the businesses were rising. As a result, in 1973 the society closed Faith-Craft.

== The Society and Eastern Churches ==
The Douglas brothers had travelled in the Near East and were ahead of their time in having an interest in the Eastern Churches. As a result, the society had a role in the foundation of the Catholic Literature Association and the Anglican and Eastern Churches Association. It also supported the Nikæan Club and provided grants for visiting Orthodox theological students.

== Difficult times ==
Charles Douglas died in 1955 and his brother John in 1956. For the next twenty years, the Faith Press and Faith-Craft Studio continued to produce notable works. Faith Press published the Archbishop of Canterbury’s Lent Book as well as important texts such as Peter Anson's ‘Building up the Waste Places’. Faith-Craft, using distinguished designers such as John Hayward and Francis Stephens, created high quality stained glass and ornaments. But costs were rising and tastes were changing. In the late 1960s, Watts & Co. moved into Faith House to take the place of Faith-Craft. In the 1970s, the society, led by its secretary, Ivor Bulmer-Thomas, invited the Church Union into Faith House to run the bookshop. Faith House continued to be an iconic building but the cost of running it was becoming a serious burden for the society.

== The Society today ==
By the late 1990s, the board of trustees knew that it needed to take urgent action to make Faith House self-financing and to provide income to pursue its objects. It obtained permission from the freeholders to let out the top floor for profit and, although its main tenant was a charity serving young people in developing countries, the income enabled the society to restore its finances. With Watts & Co. now in the basement, the society found itself in the position of that unusual phenomenon, a benevolent landlord, fostering good relations with its tenants, which included a bookshop run by SPCK from 2003 to 2006, followed by the St Stephen the Great Charitable Trust (SSG) until its closure in April 2008. The ground floor is now in active use as the headquarters of Restless Development, a charity for young people.

The main activities of the society are now –

- Making reasonably-priced accommodation available in Faith House for organisations and companies that promote the Christian faith and the Anglican Communion, as well as for other charitable organisations
- Promoting the revival and reissue of Faith Press publications and sponsoring new publications, including the Archbishop of York’s Advent Book
- Conserving an archive of Faith-Craft drawings and Faith Press publications
- Administering the Hoare Trust, which grant-aids conservation and provision of ecclesiastical needlework
- Administering the Liddon fund, a restricted fund that finances the annual Liddon Lecture and grants to young people for advanced theological study

The society is administered by trustees, known as the Court of Fellows, assisted by the secretary and treasurer.

== Gallery ==
Cope made for Johannesburg Cathedral by Faith Craft

Carved Nativity group made by Faith Craft

Stained glass window of St Mary Magdalen for St Cuthbert's, Tsolo, South Africa by Faith Craft
