= Elisey Ganaba =

Russian Orthodox Church Archbishop of Sourozh

Eilsey
- Archbishop
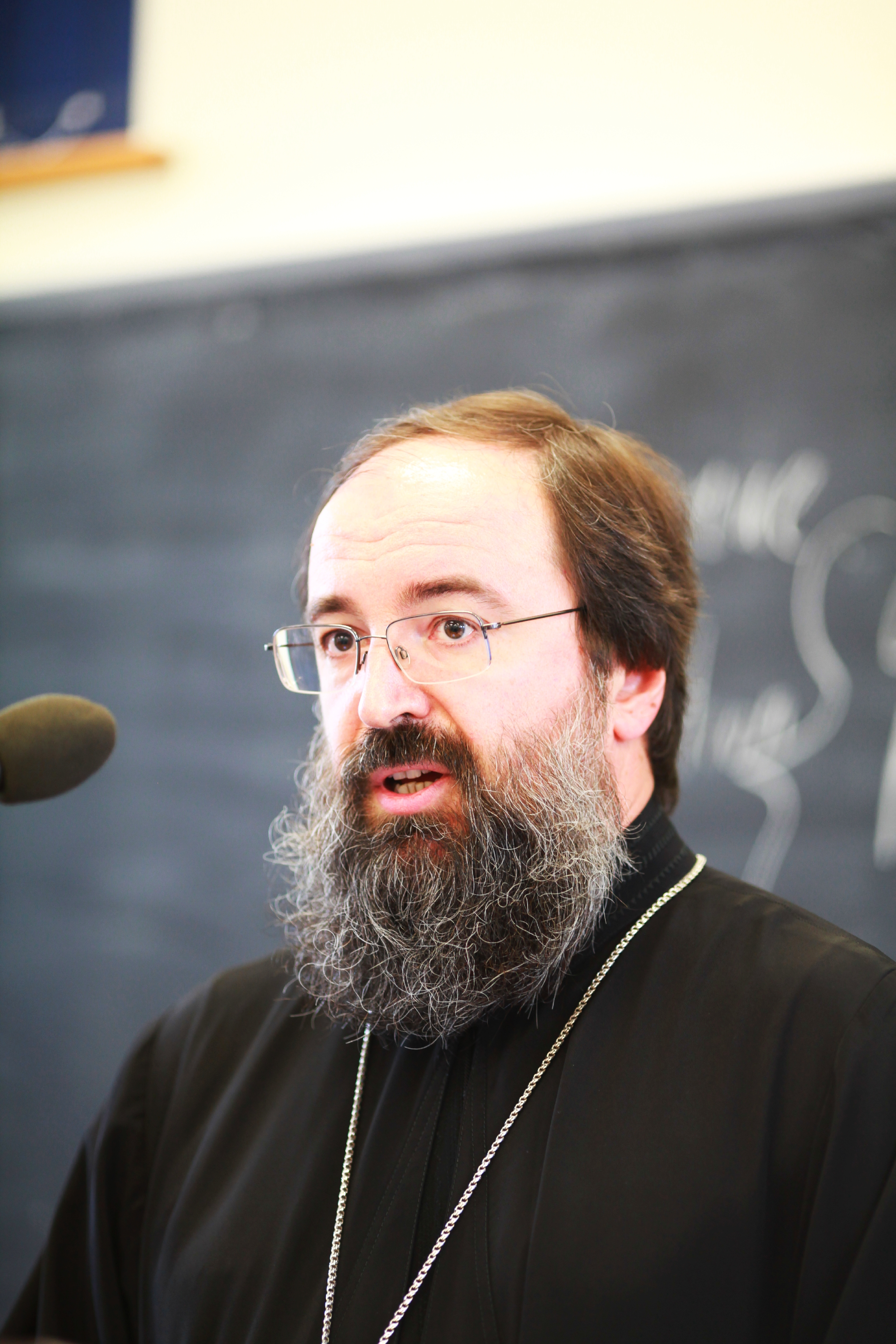
- Native name: Илья Владимирович Ганаба
- Church: Russian Orthodox Church
- Metropolis: Patriarchal Exarchate in Western Europe (Moscow Patriarchate)
- Diocese: Diocese of The Hague and the Netherlands
- Appointed: Bishop of the Diocese of Sourozh: 27 December 2007; Bishop of the Diocese of The Hague and the Netherlands: 28 December 2017
- Predecessor: Bishop of the Diocese of Sourozh: Basil Osborne; Primate of the Diocese of The Hague and the Netherlands: ?
- Successor: Bishop of the Diocese of Sourozh: Matthew (Andreev)

Orders
- Ordination: 26 November 2006
- Rank: Archbishop

Personal details
- Born: Ilya Vladimirovich Ganaba; August 1, 1962 (age 63) Leningrad, Russian Soviet Federative Socialist Republic, USSR

Archbishop Elisey (Russian: Архиепископ Елисей, secular name Ilya Vladimirovich Ganaba, Russian: Илья Владимирович Ганаба; 1 August 1962) is the archbishop of the diocese of The Hague and the Netherlands of the Russian Orthodox Church (ROC). His monastic name, "Elisey", is the equivalent of the Latin Eliseus and the English Elisha.

During 2007-2017, he served as primate of the Diocese of Sourozh in Great Britain and Ireland.

On March 12, 2022, the clergy of the Parish of St Nicholas of Myra in Amsterdam requested canonical dismissal from Archbishop Elisey and applied to join the Constantinople Patriarchate after they felt pressured by Archbishop Elisey to continue mentioning the name of Patriarch Kirill in the Divine Liturgy against their wishes (Kirill had expressed support for Vladimir Putin).

== Biography ==
=== Early life ===
Ilya Ganaba was born on August 1, 1962, in Leningrad, RSFSR, Soviet Union (modern day Saint Petersburg, Russia). His father, Vladimir Ganaba (b. 1934), was an archdeacon at the Holy Trinity Cathedral in Podolsk in the Moscow Oblast. Later, his older brother, Alexander Ganaba (b. 1957), became an archpriest and dean at the same cathedral.

In 1971, Ilya Ganaba moved with his parents to Penza. There, he attended school, graduating from high school in 1979. He also served as an episcopal subdeacon at the altar and sang in the choir of the Dormition Cathedral in Penza.

=== Seminary and ordination ===
In 1980, Ilya Ganaba entered the Leningrad Theological Seminary, now the Saint Petersburg Theological Academy. In 1982, he was accepted into the Leningrad Theological Academy, where on 17 November 1985, he took monastic vows and was given the name of Elisey in honor of St. Elisha. On November 22, 1985, he was ordained hierodeacon and on January 18, 1986, he was ordained hieromonk. On June 20, 1987, he joined the brotherhood of St. Daniel Monastery in Moscow. In 1988 he completed his postgraduate studies at the Moscow Theological Academy.

From December 27, 1988, to October 5, 1992, he served as Deputy Chief of the Russian Ecclesiastical Mission in Jerusalem.

On January 20, 1994, he was appointed head of the Foreign Institutions Sector of the Department for External Church Relations of the Russian Orthodox Church. During the Easter holiday of 1997, Metropolitan Kirill of Smolensk and Kaliningrad raised Elisey to the rank of archimandrite.

On October 7, 2000, he was appointed Representative of Patriarch of Moscow and All Russia to the Patriarchate of Antioch and All the East in Damascus, Syria.

On March 12, 2002, he was appointed Head of the Russian Ecclesiastical Mission in Jerusalem, leaving his post of representative of the Moscow Patriarchate to the Patriarchate of Antioch and All the East in Damascus.

On August 28, 2006, he greeted the First Hierarch of the Russian Orthodox Church Outside Russia, metropolitan Laurus, at the Moscow Patriarchate's Russian Ecclesiastical Mission in Jerusalem and gave him a tour of the Cathedral's holy items. Archimandrite Elisey called the visit to Holy Trinity Cathedral a symbol of the inner unity of the children of both parts of the Russian Orthodox Church and expressed joy that the Head of the Russian Orthodox Church Outside Russia had prayed at the holy places of the Cathedral.

On October 6, 2006, by the decision of the Holy Synod of the Russian Orthodox Church, Archimandrite Elisey was appointed vicar of the Diocese of Chersonesus with the title of "Bishop of Bogorodsk", and entrusted with the task of administering the Diocese of Sourozh and relieving the head of the Russian Ecclesiastical Mission in Jerusalem.

=== Ordination as bishop and primate of the Diocese of Sourozh ===
On November 26, 2006, he was ordained Bishop.

December 27, 2007, he was appointed primate of the Diocese of Sourozh, which covers the United Kingdom and Ireland.

On February 1, 2010, Patriarch Kirill of Moscow and All Russia elevated him to the rank of archbishop for "the diligent service of the Church of God".

Sourozhsphere.net wrote: "During the years of service of Vladyka Elisey, the diocese became a strong family and not some isolated national church, but a real international symbol of Russian Orthodoxy in Western Europe. Thanks to the wisdom and competent management, the diocese made friends from other Christian denominations and created strong ties with the Royal family of Great Britain."

=== Primate of the Diocese of The Hague ===
On 28 December 2017, the Holy Synod of the Russian Orthodox Church expressed its gratitude to Archbishop Elisey for his labours in building up church life in the Diocese of Sourozh and gave him a new position of service as primate of the Diocese of The Hague and the Netherlands of the Russian Orthodox Church. On 31 December 2017, Archbishop Elisey celebrated the Divine Liturgy with Bishop Matthew of Sourozh in the Dormition Cathedral, London. Archbishop Elisey then bade farewell to the parishioners of the Dormition Cathedral.

== Honours ==
- (Russia) Order of Friendship (11 August 2000) "for a great contribution to the strengthening of the civil peace and the revival of spiritual and moral traditions"

== Sources ==
- Sgois

Eastern Orthodox Church titles
Preceded by Innocent (Vasiliev) (locum tenens)	Bishop of Sourozh (Russian Orthodox Diocese of Sourozh); 27 December 2007–28 December 2017	Succeeded by Matthew (Andreev)
Preceded by Simon (Ishunin) (locum tenens)	Bishop of The Hague and the Netherlands (Diocese of The Hague and the Netherlands); 28 December 2017–	Succeeded by Incumbent
