= Fellowship of Saint Alban and Saint Sergius =

The Fellowship of Saint Alban and Saint Sergius is a Christian ecumenical society founded in 1928 to foster contact between Christians, especially those of the Anglican and Orthodox traditions. It is named in honour of Saint Alban, the Christian protomartyr of Britain, and Saint Sergius of Radonezh, a patron saint of Russia. It publishes the periodical Sobornost and arranges an annual conference. Its headquarters are currently at Oxford in Britain, and it has branches elsewhere in Britain and in Bulgaria, Denmark, Greece, Romania, Russia and Sweden. There have also been sporadic activities in Canada and the United States.

In 2025, the society is based in Oxford, England.

Nicholas Zernov and his wife Militza wrote The Fellowship of St Alban and St Sergius: a Historical Memoir in 1979 to commemorate the 50th anniversary of the fellowship.

== Literature ==
- Bryn Geffert, Eastern Orthodox and Anglicans: Diplomacy, Theology, and the Politics of Interwar Ecumenism Notre Dame, Indiana: University of Notre Dame Press, 2010. ISBN 9780268029753
- Dimitrios Filippos Salapatas, The Fellowship of St Alban and St Sergius: Orthodox and Anglican Ecumenical Relations 1927–2012. Cambridge: Cambridge Scholars Publishing, 2018. ISBN 9781527505476. Foreword by Rowan Williams
- Nicolas and Militza Zernov, The Fellowship of St Alban and St Sergius: A historical Memoir, Oxford, 1979

== See also ==
- Anglican and Eastern Churches Association
- Anthony of Sourozh
- John Albert Douglas
- Sergei Bulgakov
