= Kingston House estate, London =

Place in London, United Kingdom

Coordinates: 51.5014°N 0.1713°W

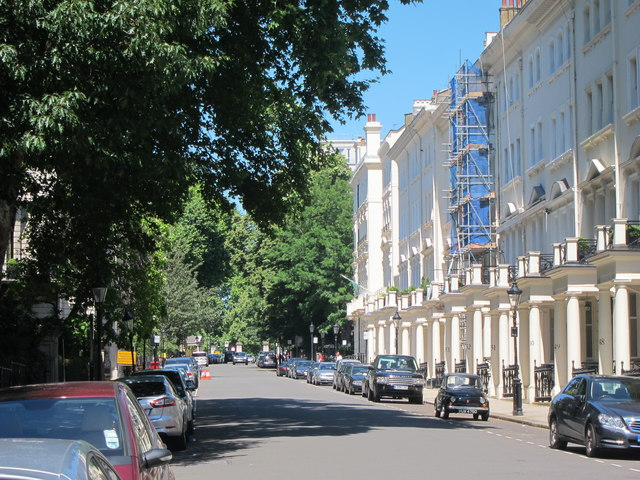
One side of the full square at Ennismore Gardens, a square surrounded by its numbers 1 to 59, all listed buildings.

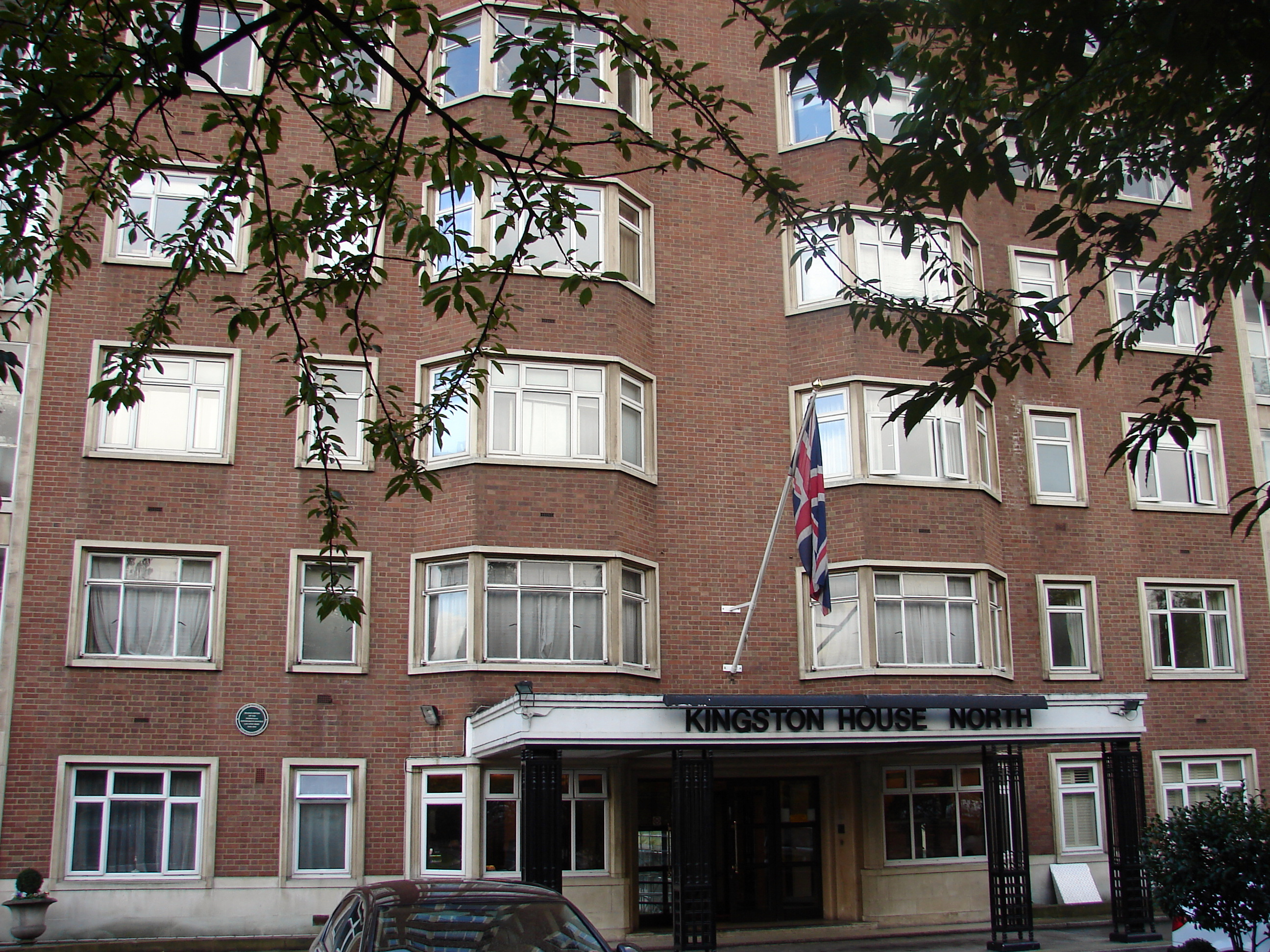
Kingston House North

The Kingston House estate and Ennismore Gardens in Knightsbridge is a green, dual-character area within the western limits of the City of Westminster in London. The first-named is immediately south of Hyde Park, London taking up the park's semi-panorama row of 8 to 13 Princes Gate (demolished) and otherwise, as to more of its wings, set around the east of Princes Gate Garden including a terrace of houses №s 1 to 7 Bolney Gate. The second-named is a garden square of 59 tall creamy-white terraced houses and the approach road to Prince of Wales Gate, Hyde Park (Note: This approach road is fronted by 1 to 7 Bolney Gate hence the very direct connection) as well as the identical-size public, square green of the church that is since 1956 the Russian Orthodox Cathedral of the Dormition of the Mother of God and All Saints facing which green are its anomalous outlier row for a London garden square, №s 61 to 66. (Note: The network-style street is thus one full garden square; three sides of another and two sides of a third one, of which one of its two sides is built up. The two estate components are likewise combined in the thorough Central London work, the Survey of London cited below.) The relatively small, broad-fronted house set against the Consulate-used pairing at №s 61 to 62 is № 60 and as with the other 65 numbers of Ennismore Gardens is a listed building.

Kingston House estate has some Art Deco features but has no statutorily listed buildings. It has four 1930s to 1950s ranges of flats in 1930s style, arranged in three parts.

== Kingston House estate ==
=== Kingston House, demolished ===
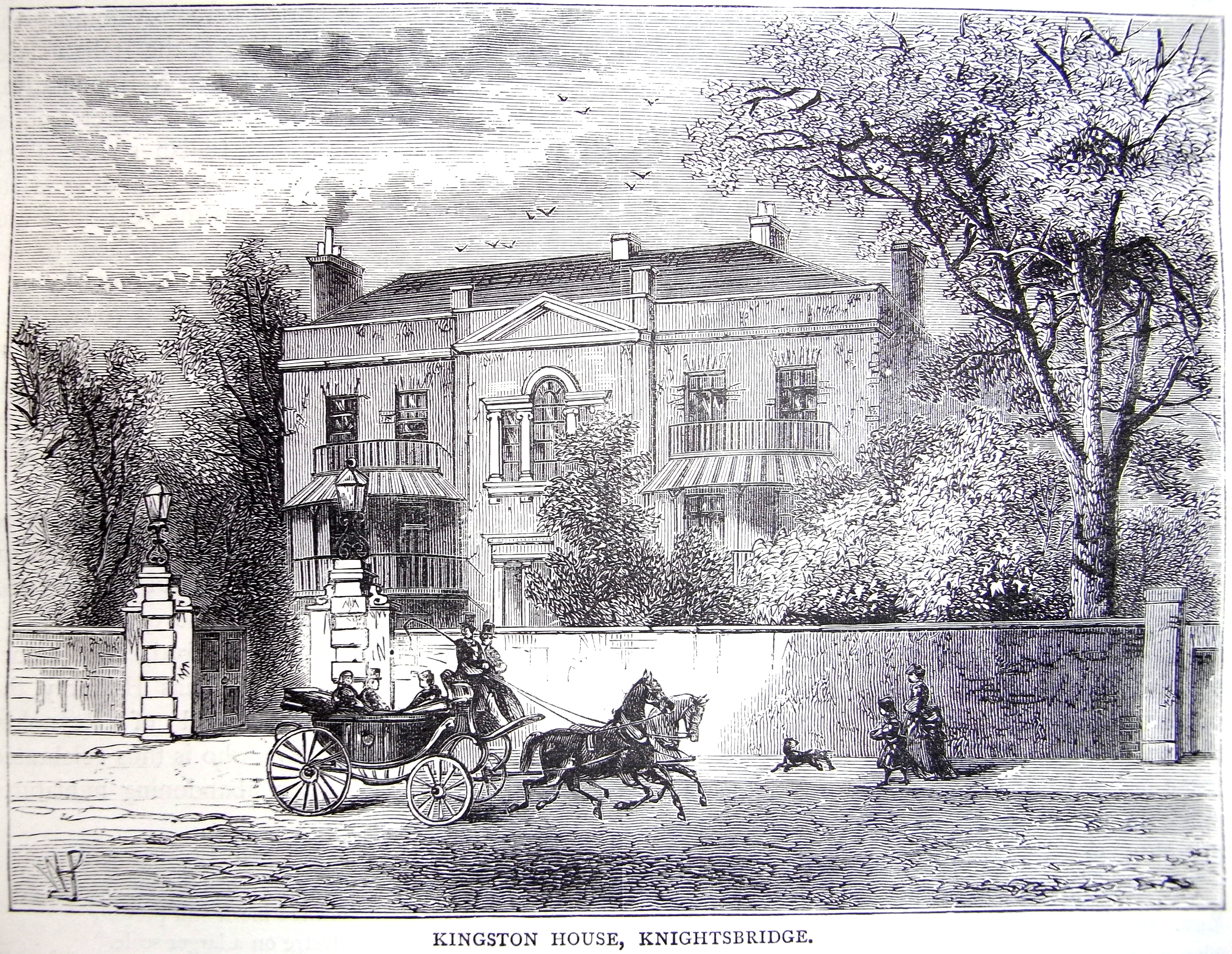
"Kingston House, Knightsbridge", engraving circa 1878

Crop of Christopher and John Greenwood's 8 inch-to-mile map published in 1827 from an 1830 republication (click to view all). In the far west is Gore House

Kingston House, originally called Chudleigh House, was a Palladian mansion, built in the mid-eighteenth century by Evelyn Pierrepont, 2nd Duke of Kingston-upon-Hull (1711–1773) for his mistress and later bigamous wife Elizabeth Chudleigh (1720–1788). On her death it passed to the Duke’s nephew Charles Pierrepont, 1st Earl Manvers, and had a series of tenants, among which Sir George Warren, MP; the 6th Earl of Stair; and Edward Loveden Loveden of Buscot Park.

In 1813 the house saw its only sale (for continued use as such). This was to William Hare, Baron Ennismore, later 1st Earl of Listowel. He died at the house in 1837 and was succeeded by his grandson William Hare, 2nd Earl of Listowel who seldom occupied it. He sold some grounds for house-building. The house was again let to tenants (which would include Richard Wellesley, 1st Marquess Wellesley, who died there in 1842, and Baron Lionel de Rothschild). It remained with the family until four years after the death in 1931 of the 4th Earl, when it passed to his younger son, created Viscount Blakenham. In 1935 the house was sold for building of many more homes, and after the death of the Dowager Countess of Listowel in 1936, it was demolished in 1937 and replaced by two large blocks of private-ownership apartments, Kingston House North and Kingston House South.

=== First redevelopments ===
In the 1840s, development began with the construction of houses on Princes Gate and the east side of Ennismore Gardens, as well as a public house, the Ennismore Arms which was the first building of this scheme: built in 1845-7. It stood at the southern end of Ennismore Mews, which ran behind the houses on the eastern side of Princes Terrace. It suffered bomb damage during World War II and was rebuilt by Watney’s in the 1950s. It closed in 2002 then was demolished.

All Saints' Church was built in 1848–9, designed in the Italianate style by Lewis Vulliamy. The church has murals by Heywood Sumner and is a Grade II* listed building. William Ralph Inge was vicar there 1904–1907. The Anglican church looked for another denomination to take it on in 1955, so late in the following year it became the Russian Orthodox Patriarchial Church of The Assumption of All Saints, part of the Russian Orthodox Diocese of Sourozh. The prized organ was taken by agreement, to be installed at the Church of St John-at-Hackney.

In the 1860s the 3rd Earl released more land; the rest of Ennismore Gardens, including the private garden square at its centre, was laid out in the 1870s. The five-storey houses have porticos with Corinthian columns, and a continuous railing creating a first floor balcony. All 55 are listed buildings (in the starting, mainstream category, known as Grade II). Many lamps on the pavements of roads are likewise listed.

Moncorvo House was completed in 1880 for Albert George Sandeman (future Governor of the Bank of England) and named in honour of his father-in-law, Portugal’s ambassador in London, the Visconde Da Torre de Moncorvo. In 1883, Bolney House was built to a design by the eminent architect Richard Norman Shaw for Alfred Huth, son of Henry Huth.

=== Current form ===
Kingston House North replaces the demolished townhouse of Evelyn Pierrepont, 2nd Duke of Kingston-upon-Hull (1711–1773), yet is wider and has two long projections to the south; its eastern wing (Kingston House North) has a smaller projection to the south; it replaced a grand house fenced off from Kingston House.

From the 1930s onwards, many of the original buildings, including Kingston House itself, were replaced by apartment blocks and modern townhouses. The Second World War brought further changes in use of the pre-war mansions. Moncorvo House became the post-war London HQ of the Canadian Joint Staff Establishment and the Embassy of Morocco before being demolished in 1964 and replaced with Moncorvo Close. Bolney House was demolished in the 1960s, replaced with Bolney Gate a terrace, numbered 1 to 7, on one of the two offshoots of the road named Ennismore Gardens – that leading to Prince of Wales Gate.

During World War II, the Norwegian government-in-exile took a main base at Kingston House North.

After this war vacant parts of the grounds of long-demolished Kingston House saw Kingston House East (the E and SE wing of the North instance) and the two blocks of Kingston House South built, flanking 1 to 10 Morcorvo Close; the western block (№s 1 to 32) has short projecting wings; the eastern (№s 40 to 90, non consecutively) has none.

== Ennismore Gardens ==
The independent Hampshire School occupied №63 from 1933–2008, when it moved to the former Chelsea Library.

The iconic Hollywood actress Ava Gardner lived at №34 from 1968 until her death in 1990, and is commemorated by an English Heritage blue plaque on the side wall of the property. She is also commemorated by an ornamental urn in the square. She could be often be spotted going for a swim in the nearby Imperial College pool with a towel rolled under her arm.

The Libyan consulate and visa office occupies №s 61–62; the main embassy is at 15 Knightsbridge. Its smaller-footprint rear forms № 60, which with №s 63–65 directly to the east are listed in the same way and for the same reasons as the main square itself.

From 2010 to 2019 there were 50 sales of conversion apartments among the townhouses of Ennismore Gardens, averaging £1,864,000.

== Ennismore Garden Mews ==
Ennismore Garden Mews has been used to set film scenes. Alfred Hitchcock used № 31 as the home of Barbara Leigh-Hunt's character, 'Brenda Blaney', in the 1972 film Frenzy. The 1987 VW Golf TV advert directed by David Bailey featured Paula Hamilton leaving № 23.

== Notable residents ==
=== Kingston House North ===
- Johan Nygaardsvold, exiled Prime Minister of Norway
- Kenneth More, actor
- Margaret Pedler, novelist

=== Kingston House South ===
- № 9. Hugh Trenchard, 1st Viscount Trenchard
- № 23 Margaret Pyke

=== Moncorvo House (since demolished) ===
- Albert George Sandeman, governor of the Bank of England
- Henri d'Orleans, duke of Aumale
- John Gretton, brewer and father of John Gretton, 1st Baron Gretton.
- Arthur Graham Glasgow, American engineer and industrialist

=== Bolney House (since demolished) ===
- Henry Tate junior, son of Henry Tate the sugar magnate
- Oswald Partington, 2nd Baron Doverdale
- Sydney Martineau, Olympic fencer.

=== Ennismore Gardens ===
The first residents were aristocrats and statesmen's families; in the 20th century they were joined by artists and actors.

- № 1 Sir Thomas Edwards-Moss, banker (1872–90)
- № 2 Lord St John of Fawsley
- № 3 Alexander Grant Dallas, Canadian politician (1872–5)
- № 4 Etheldred, Dowager Countess of Hopetoun (1873–84); Viscount Tiverton (1918)
- № 5 Albert George Sandeman, port-wine importer, Bank of England director (1872–79); Moubray St John, 19th Baron St John of Bletso, soldier and politician
- № 6 William Brett, 1st Viscount Esher, judge (1870–99); Charles James Jackson businessman and collector.
- № 7 Richard Seaman, formula one Racing car driver and parent Wm J. Beattie-Seaman, 1930s
- № 9 Sir John Brunner MP, industrialist
- № 10 Samuel Whitbread MP, (1873–99)
- № 11 Charles Morgan Norwood, merchant and ship-owner (1890–91; Walter Long, 1st Viscount Long, statesman
- № 13 Arthur Godley, 1st Baron Kilbracken; Thomas Jex-Blake, headmaster of Rugby School
- № 14 Vere Fane Benett-Stanford, MP for Shaftesbury (1876–90)
- № 15 Lieut.-Col. Edward Henry Clive Grenadier Guards (1875–87)
- № 16 Vaughan Hanning Vaughan-Lee, MP (1875–81)
- № 18 Victor Bruce, 9th Earl of Elgin; Sir Granville Ryrie, High Commissioner for Australia (1927–1932)
- № 19 Michael Biddulph, 1st Baron Biddulph, MP, banker, (1877–1915)
- № 20 Frederick DuCane Godman, zoologist (1875–82); Sir Edward Davson, 1st Baronet, chairman of the British Empire Producers' Organization; Brigadier-General Charles Woodroffe, military secretary to Edward VIII
- № 21 John Bazley White MP (1889–90); William George Ainslie MP.
- № 22 Frederick Campbell, 3rd Earl Cawdor (1878–91); Herbert Plumer, 1st Viscount Plumer, British Army field marshal
- № 23 the 10th Countess of Winchilsea and Nottingham (as Dowager (widow)) (1877–90)
- № 25 Thomas Bevan (politician) 1880
- № 27 Emile G. Levita, great-great grandfather of David Cameron (1873–1908)
- № 28 Ralph Creyke, MP (1873–84)
- № 29 Admiral Lord Hood; Sir Peter Bark, Russian statesman; Arthur O'Neill Ulster Unionist MP, whose son Terence O'Neill, 4th Prime Minister of Northern Ireland, was born there in 1914
- № 30 Sir Robert Hay, golfer (1873–84); Alfred Emmott, 1st Baron Emmott, politician and cotton-spinner; Charles Gray, actor.
- № 32 Henry Yates Thompson, proprietor of the Pall Mall Gazette, collector of illuminated manuscripts (1873–77)
- № 34 Charles Allanson-Winn, 3rd Baron Headley (1873–77); Ava Gardner; Jack Hawkins, actor.
- № 35 Sir Walter Armstrong, art historian (1873–6); Sir Edward Durand, colonial administrator
- № 37 Sir John Hardy Thursby, High Sheriff of Lancashire
- № 42 William James Thompson, tea broker
- № 46 The Hon Clarence Tan, President of the New Zealand Society UK and Chairman of Vereniging Neerlandia
- № 50 William George Campbell, lawyer and mental health commissioner
- № 61 John MacGregor PP (Glasgow)
- № 68 Gavin Campbell, 1st Marquess of Breadalbane (1908–1922); Moura Budberg, literary hostess.
- № 69 Edith Summerskill, Baroness Summerskill, politician and writer.

=== Ennismore Gardens Mews ===
- № 35 Sir Alec Guinness

== See also ==
- Squares in the City of Westminster, which applies to the main square and that facing five 'houses' and to the cathedral within the limbs of Ennismore Gardens, as well as from many stances to Princes Gate Garden, onto which homes on five streets back.
- Grade II listed buildings in the City of Westminster, which applies to all buildings/homes addressed without other street/development name Ennismore Gardens (№s 1 to 65), except for the cathedral below.
- Dormition Cathedral, London, a Grade II* listed building.
- List of garden squares in London

== Notes and references ==
Footnotes

Citations
