= Nikæan Club =

The Nikæan Club
- Formation: 1926
- Founder: Canon John Albert Douglas, Archbishop Randall Davidson
- Purpose: Ecumenical ministry
- Location: Lambeth Palace
- Members: 400
- President: Archbishop of Canterbury
- Parent organization: Church of England
- Website: www.nikaeanclub.org.uk

The Nikæan Club was established in 1926 to support the ecumenical ministry of the Archbishop of Canterbury.

== History ==
The club was founded by Canon John Albert Douglas, a major figure in Anglican–Orthodox relations in the 20th century. In 1905, with his brother, the Revd Charles Edward Douglas, he founded the Society of the Faith, which supported the Nikæan Club financially in its early years. The club owes its origin to the celebration in London to mark the sixteenth centenary of the First Ecumenical Council of the Christian Church held in Nicæa in 325. The club has almost 400 members. Each successive Archbishop of Canterbury has been president since the club began. The club holds an annual dinner in York in honour of the General Synod’s ecumenical representatives and guests. Other dinners are usually held in Lambeth Palace. Notable members in the years after the Second World War included such figures as John Betjeman, Rose Macaulay, Osbert Lancaster and Dorothy L. Sayers.

In 1992, the Nikæan Club founded a charitable trust, The Nikaean Ecumenical Trust, to finance study trips made by members of Christian Churches from overseas. This trust has charity number 1015755 in the Charity Commission for England and Wales Register of Charities. In 2025 it reported £19.34k in total gross income, with £25.39k in total expenditure.

The club suffered damage to its reputation in 1993, when its chairman Patrick Gilbert, head of the Society for Promoting Christian Knowledge, received a suspended sentence for child abuse. Canon Christopher Hill, also a member of the Nikæan Club accompanied Gilbert to court, and former Archbishop of Canterbury, Donald Coggan, wrote a character witness letter. Gilbert, who was also secretary of the wine committee at The Athenaeum, admitted a previous conviction for indecent assault on two 13-year-old school boys in 1962.

== The Nikaean Cross ==
The Nikaean Cross is a fourth-century Coptic bronze cross which was presented to the Club by Sir Ronald Storrs. The cross had been presented to Sir Ronald when he was Oriental Secretary to Lord Kitchener by the Coptic Pope Cyril V (reigned 1874-1927). The Nikaean Cross is placed in front of the President at meetings of the Club. Replicas are given to distinguished ecumenical guests.

== See also ==
- Nobody's Friends
- The Athenaeum
