= John Albert Douglas =

John Albert Douglas (21 September 1868 – 3 July 1956) was a priest of the Church of England and a major figure in Anglican–Orthodox relations in the 20th century.

Douglas was ordained in 1894 in Newark, Nottinghamshire.

The Society of the Faith was founded in August 1905 by Douglas and his brother, the Revd Charles Edward Douglas, both notable figures in the Anglo-Catholic revival. The object of the society was to create: "an Association of Christians in communion with the See of Canterbury for mutual assistance in the work of Christ's Church and for the furtherance of such charitable undertakings as may from time to time be decided upon, more especially for the popularisation of the Catholic faith."

Douglas was a member of the Anglican and Eastern Churches Association and the Fellowship of Saint Alban and Saint Sergius. He was also the vicar of St Michael Paternoster Royal in London from 1933 to 1952. He had served previously, from 1909 to 1933, at St Luke's Church, Camberwell, in the Diocese of Southwark. He was the founder of the Nikæan Club.

== Bibliography ==
- The Home of Mother Church. Illustrated by Noyes Lewis, Tom. London: Faith Press. 1914.
- Pictures of Russian Worship. London: Faith Press. c. 1915.
- The Story of the Good Shepherd. London: Wells Gardner & Co. 1916.
- The Redemption of Saint Sophia. Illustrated by Henderson, A. (3rd ed.). London: Faith Press. 1919.
- The Young Christian's Progress. Illustrated by Noyes Lewis, Tom. London: Faith Press. 1920.
- The Relations of the Anglican Churches with the Eastern-Orthodox, Especially in Regard to Anglican Orders. London: Faith Press. 1921.
- The Lamp of the Threefold Vow. London: Faith Press. 1924.
- "Archbishop Germanos on Anglicanism". The Christian East. 10 (1): 11–20. 1929.
- "The Orthodox Delegation to the Lambeth Conference of 1930". The Christian East. 11 (2): 49–64. 1930.
- "The Orthodox Principle of Economy, and Its Exercise". The Christian East. 13: 91–98. 1932.
- "Introduction". In Matthew, A. F. The Teaching of the Abyssinian Church, as Set Forth by the Doctors of the Same. Translated by Matthew, A. F. London: Faith Press. 1936.

== See also ==
- Anglican and Eastern Churches Association
- Society of the Faith
