= Nicholas Zernov =

Russian-born British Christian academic

Nicolas Michaelovich Zernov (9 October 1898 [O.S. 21 September] - 25 August 1980) (Russian: Никола́й Миха́йлович Зёрнов) was a Christian Russian émigré who settled in Britain, and taught theology at Oxford University. He wrote many books about the Orthodox Church, and about Christianity in Russia, of which the best known is The Russian Religious Renaissance of the Twentieth Century (1963). He worked continuously for the unity of Christians, and was one of the founders of the ecumenical Fellowship of Saint Alban and Saint Sergius in 1928. He was also secretary of the fellowship from 1935 to 1947.

== Biography ==
Nicolai Michaelovitch Zernov was born in Russia on 9 October 1898 in Moscow. He had two sisters: Sophia and Maria and one brother Vladimir. They were the children of a Moscow doctor who developed Essentuki in the Caucasus as a model thermal resort in the very beginning of the 20th century. He himself began medical studies in Moscow in 1917, but after the Russian revolution and civil war his family fled to the Caucasus, arriving in Georgia in 1920. In early 1921 they were taken by British diplomats from Georgia to Istanbul. They made their way to Serbia, and Nicolas graduated in theology at Belgrade University in 1925.

In 1926 the family reached Paris. Zernov was a founder of the Brotherhood of St Seraphim of Sarov, and in Paris from 1926 to 1929 was secretary of the Russian Student Christian Movement. He was also the first editor of their periodical, Vestnik Russkogo Studencheskogo Dvizheniya.

In 1927 he married Militza Vladimirovna Lavrova (Милице Лавровой, 1899-1994). She was a doctor and a dental surgeon, practising in a London hospital.

In 1927 and 1928 Zernov organized in Britain two Anglo-Russian Student Conferences, which established strong contacts between English-speaking Christians and Orthodox Christians who had fled Russia after the Russian Revolution of 1917, and in 1928 he became a founder of the Anglican-Orthodox ecumenical group, the Fellowship of Saint Alban and Saint Sergius. After taking his D. Phil degree at Oxford University in 1932 he served as secretary of the Fellowship from 1935 to 1947. He was an associate of A. M. Allchin, Georges Florovsky and other prominent figures in Anglican-Orthodox relations in the 20th century.

In 1947 Zernov gave up his secretaryship of the Fellowship and began teaching in Oxford University, as Spalding Lecturer in Eastern Orthodox Studies. For two short periods he left Oxford, to serve as Principal of the Catholicate College Pathanamthitta in Kerala, India (1953-1954) and as Visiting Professor of Ecumenical Theology, Drew University, New Jersey, USA (1956). From 1959 he was warden of St. Gregory and St. Macrina House, Oxford.

With his parents, sisters and brother he wrote a memoir, Volume 1 "На переломе. Три поколения одной московской семьи (семейная хроника Зёрновых 1812-1921)" and volume 2 "За рубежом. Белград-Париж-Оксфорд. Хроника семьи Зёрновых, 1921-1972" : (1973). In 1979 he and his wife published The Fellowship of St Alban and St Sergius: a historical memoir, to commemorate the 50th anniversary of the founding of the Fellowship.

He died in Oxford on 25 August 1980. He bequeathed his library to the Library of Foreign Literature in Moscow. His wife died on February 4th,1994.

== Bibliography ==
- Some Figures Illustrating the Present State of the Eastern Orthodox Church (1935)
- Moscow the Third Rome (1937) (6 изданий, в том числе американское - в 1971 г.).
- St. Sergius Builder of Russia (1939), 155 p. (based on his Oxford D.Phil. thesis)
- The Church of the Eastern Christians (1942), 114 p.
- (with B. Vancura) The Bible in Russia and Czechoslovakia (1943?)
- Three Russian Prophets (Khomiakov, Dostoevsky, Soloviev) (1944), 171 pp. (Переиздано в США в 1974 г.) (With translations into Norwegian and Russian (Три русских пророка: Хомяков. Достоевский. Соловьев, 1955, 214 с.)).
- The Russians and their Church (London: S.P.C.K., 1945), 176 p. (Reprint 1954; revised 1964, 1968, 1978, 1994 pbk reprint of 1978 3rd edition. Greek translation 1972, 1978).
- The Reintegration of the Church: A study in inter-communion (1952), 128 p.
- Вселенская Церковь и русское православие (1952) [I.e. 'The ecumenical Church and Russian Orthodoxy']
- Содружество св. Албания и Преподобного Сергия Радонежского (1952), 3I5 с.
- Ruslands Kirke og Nordens Kirke (1954) [In Danish] (With translations into Swedish (Den Ortodoxa Kyrkan, 1955) and Finnish (Idan Ortodoksinen Kirkko, 1958))
- The Christian East (The Eastern Orthodox Church and Indian Christianity) (1956), 138 p.
- Eastern Christendom: a Study of the Origin and Development of the Eastern Orthodox Church (1961), 326 p. (With translations into Italian (Il Cristianesimo Orientale,1962), Spanish (Cristianismo Oriental,1962) and Polish (Wschodnie Chrzescijanstwo, 1967)).
- Orthodox Encounter: the Christian East and the Ecumenical Movement (1961), 200 p.
- The Russian Religious Renaissance of the 20th Century (1963), 410 p. (With translations into Russian (Русское религиозное возрождение XX века, 1963; 2nd. ed. 1974) and Italian (1978)).
- (editor) Нa переломе: tri pocoleniia odnoi Moscovscai sem'i, semeinaia chronica Zernovych, 1812-1921 (1970), 478 с.
- (with M. V. Zernova) За рубежом: Белград - Париж - Оксфорд: Хроника семьи Зерновых (1921–1972) (1973), 561 с.
- Русские писатели эмиграции: Биографические сведения и библиография их книг по богословию, религиозной философии, истории Церкви и православной культуре (1973)
- (With M. V. Zernova) The Fellowship of St Alban and St Sergius: a historical memoir (1979)
- Sunset Years: a Russian Pilgrim in the West (1983)
- ロシア正敎会の歴史 (1991) (Japanese)
- 러시아정교회사: 러시아의일천년신앙역사 (1991) (Korean)
