= Samuel Pennant =

Lord Mayor of London

Sir Samuel Pennant (died May 1750) was a Lord Mayor of London.

He was appointed a Sheriff of London for 1745, knighted in the same year, and then elected Lord Mayor for 1749 but died the following year in office, one of a large number of dignitaries and attendants afflicted by an outbreak of "gaol fever" in the courtroom of the Old Bailey, which adjoined Newgate Prison. There is a monument to him in the church of St Michael Paternoster Royal. He was succeeded as Lord Mayor by John Blachford.

Sir Samuel's brother John was the father of Richard Pennant, 1st Baron Penrhyn. He was also a distant relative of the Welsh naturalist and antiquarian Thomas Pennant.

He is buried in St Michael Paternoster Royal with his tomb being sculpted by John Michael Rysbrack.
