= St Michael Paternoster Royal =

Coordinates: 51°30′40″N 0°5′32″W

- Parish Church of Saint Michael Paternoster Royal
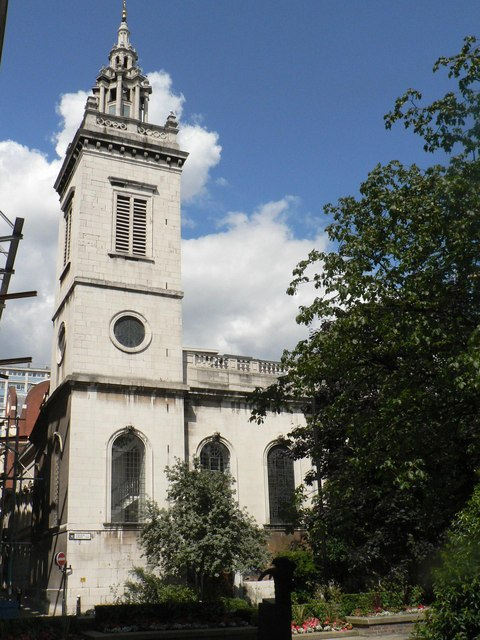
- East facade, College St

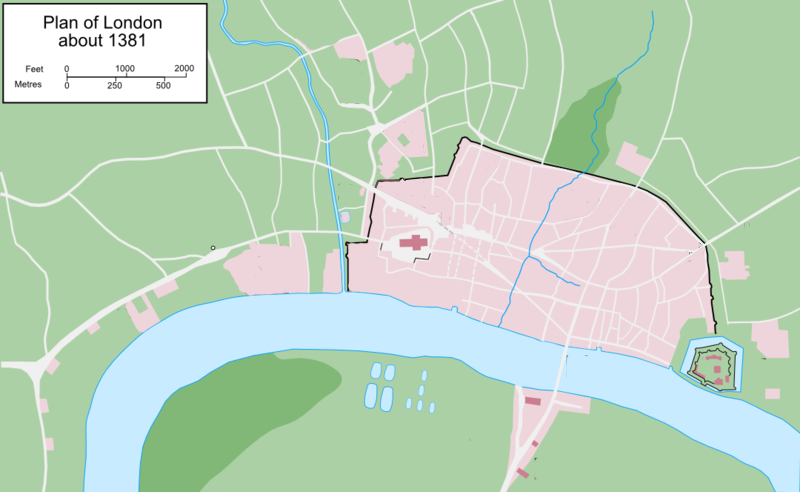
- Location within City of London Location within City of London in 1300
- Location: College Hill, City of London, EC3
- Country: England
- Language: English
- Denomination: Church of England
- Previous denomination: Roman Catholicism (to 1538)
- Website: squaremilechurches.co.uk/our-churches/church/st-michael-paternoster/

History
- Founded: Before 1219
- Founder: Richard Whittington (1409 as a collegiate church)
- Dedication: Saint Michael

Architecture
- Heritage designation: Grade I listed building
- Architect: Christopher Wren
- Style: English Baroque
- Years built: 1685–1694 (current building)

Administration
- Diocese: London

Clergy
- Bishop: Bishop of London

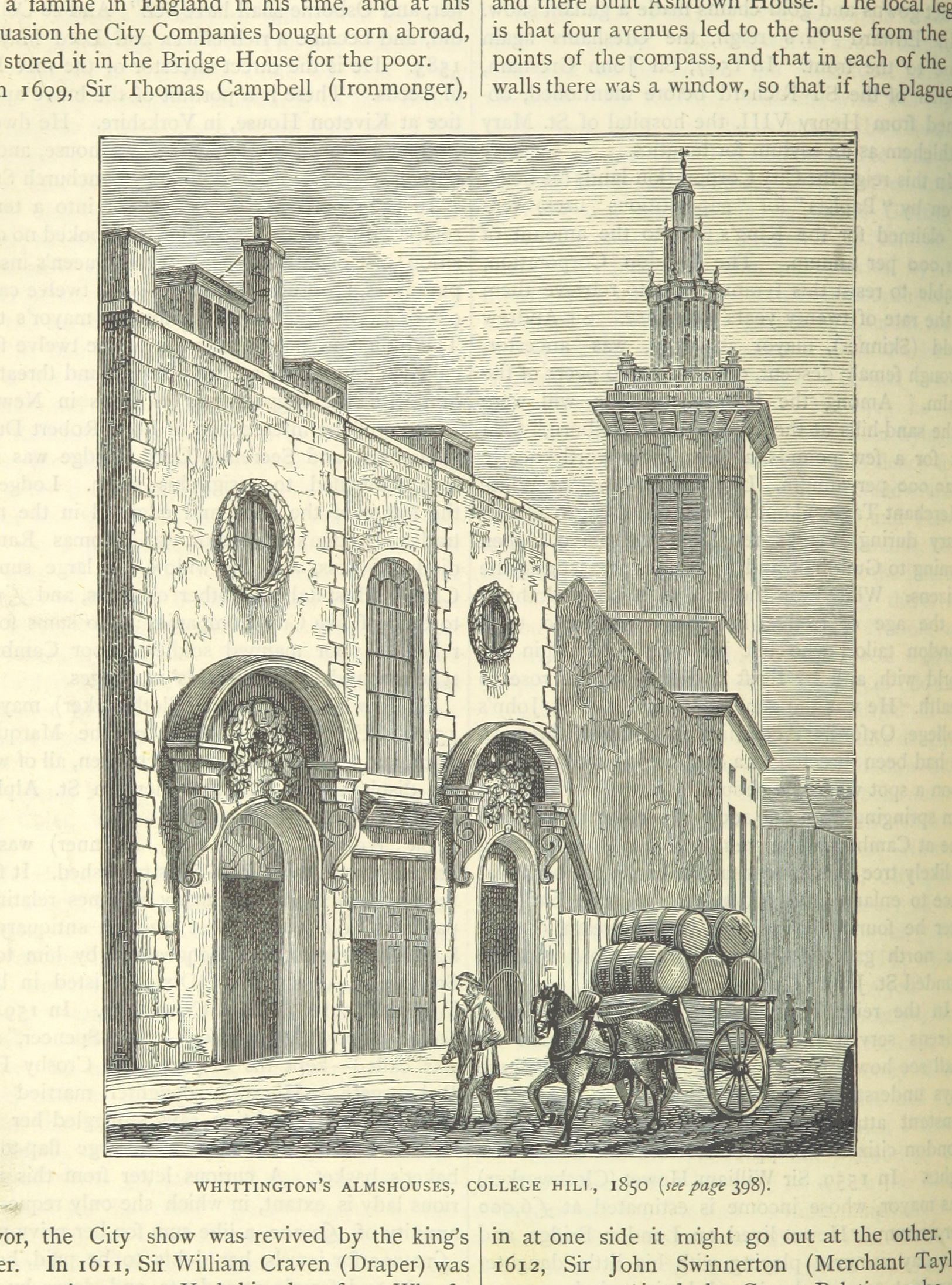
Whittington's Almshouses on College Hill and the tower of St Michael Paternoster Royal, 1850

St Michael Paternoster Royal is a church in the City of London. The original building, which was first recorded in the 13th century, was destroyed in the Great Fire of London in 1666. The church was rebuilt under the aegis of Sir Christopher Wren. However St Michael's was severely damaged during the London Blitz in the Second World War. It was restored between 1966 and 1968.

In 1423 Richard "Dick" Whittington, the fabled Lord Mayor of London, was buried within its precincts; although the tomb is now lost.

== History ==
Pre-Great Fire London had seven churches dedicated to the Archangel Michael, all but one (St Michael le Querne) of which were rebuilt after the Great Fire. The earliest record of St Michael's is as St Michael of Paternosterchierch and is dated 1219. The suffix comes from its location on Paternoster Lane, (now College Hill), which, in turn was named after the sellers of paternosters – or rosaries – based there. The suffix Royal is first recorded in the next century and refers to another nearby street, now vanished, called Le Ryole, which was a corruption of La Réole, a town near Bordeaux. This street was so named due to the presence of numerous wine merchants.

A local resident in the early 15th century was Richard Whittington, four times Lord Mayor of London. One of his earlier philanthropic acts, made in 1409, was to pay for the rebuilding and extension of St Michael Paternoster Royal after a vacant plot of land was acquired in Le Ryole. He later founded the College of St Spirit and St Mary within the church, so that St Michael's became a collegiate church, i.e. it was administered by a college of priests, in this case five, instead of a rector. It was commonly known as Whittington's College, or Whittington College. (The college was relocated from College Hill to Highgate Hill c. 1820s, and removed again in 1966 to Felbridge, West Sussex.)

Adjacent to the church, Whittington also founded an almshouse. The college was dissolved by King Edward VI in 1548; but was re-established in a new entity a few years later under Queen Mary I. The title seems in any case to have persisted for the church, giving the names of College Street, and College Hill. The almshouse moved to Highgate in 1808 and later to its present location in East Grinstead in 1966.

Sir Richard was buried in St Michael's in 1423 on the south side of the altar near his wife, Alice. John Stow records that Whittington's body was dug up by the then Rector Thomas Mountain, during the reign of Edward VI, in the belief that he had been buried with treasure. He was not, so Mountain took his leaden shroud. The grave was dug up again during the reign of Mary I and his body re-covered in lead. An attempt to find his grave in 1949 did uncover a mummified cat, but no Lord Mayor's body.

Other worthies buried in the pre-Fire church were William Oldhall (d. 1459) Speaker of the House of Commons, the Lord Mayors John Yonge (d. 1466) and William Bayley (d. 1524), Peter Blundell (d. 1601) founder of Blundell's School, (mentioned in Blackmore's novel Lorna Doone) and the Cavalier poet John Cleveland (d. 1658).

After the church's destruction in the Fire, the parish was united with that of St Martin Vintry, also destroyed but not rebuilt. Construction of a new church began in 1685 (one of the last of the 51 churches to be rebuilt) and stopped in 1688 owing to the financial uncertainty associated with the Glorious Revolution. Building began again the next year, supervised and built by Wren's master mason Edward Strong the Elder. It was finished in 1694. Its steeple was built between 1713 and 1717. The cost of the rebuilding totalled £8,937.

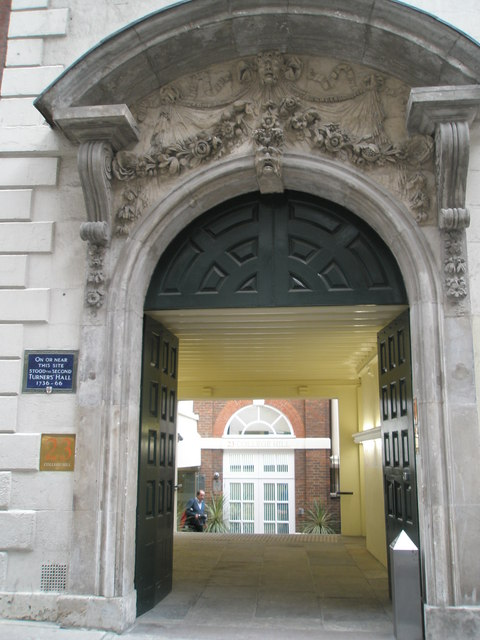
Turners' Courtyard

A monument to another Lord Mayor, Sir Samuel Pennant, sculpted by Michael Rysbrack, survives from 1750. Pennant died from jail fever caught from prisoners in the court dock.

St Michael's underwent a number of renovations in the 19th century, by James Elmes in 1820, William Butterfield in 1866 and Ewan Christian in 1894. Their work was lost on 23 July 1944 when the church was hit by a V-1 flying bomb, leaving only its walls and tower.

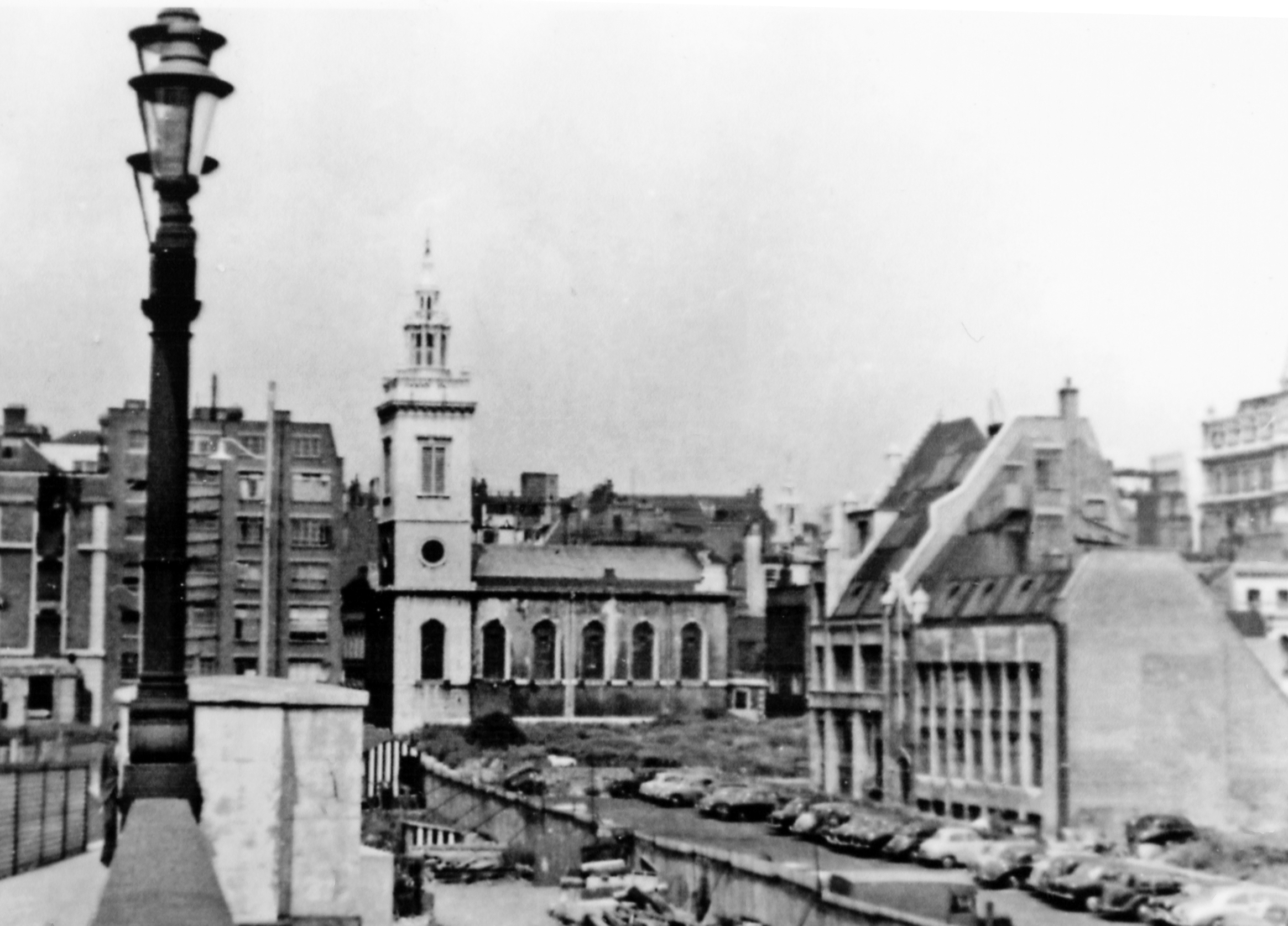
The damaged church, 1955

Services continued in the remaining shell until 1955. A proposal by the diocese to demolish the walls and preserve the tower only was successfully opposed by the City of London Corporation, and the church restored by Elidir Davies between 1966 and 1968. It is the latest City church to be restored.

St Michael's was reopened by the Duke of Edinburgh on 19 December 1968 as the Headquarters of the Mission to Seamen (now Mission to Seafarers), an Anglican organisation which supports chaplains in ports around the world. It is also supported by City Livery Companies.

St Michael Paternoster Royal is a chapel within the jurisdiction of the Bishop of London and since 2018 the office of the Bishop of London has been based there.

In 2024, it was put up for sale and was described in the marketing material as a “former Wren church” and "Benefits from three floors of open plan offices."

== Architecture ==
St Michael's is rectangular in plan, with only the west front on College Hill being slightly out of true. Before the Second World War the south front was hemmed in by buildings. Following bomb damage, these buildings were cleared and Whittington Garden laid out on their site, so that St Michael's main façade is now on the south, along Upper Thames Street. The south front is faced with Portland stone and has six round-headed windows with cherub keystones. The less prominent north and east fronts are of brick. The roof is balustraded.

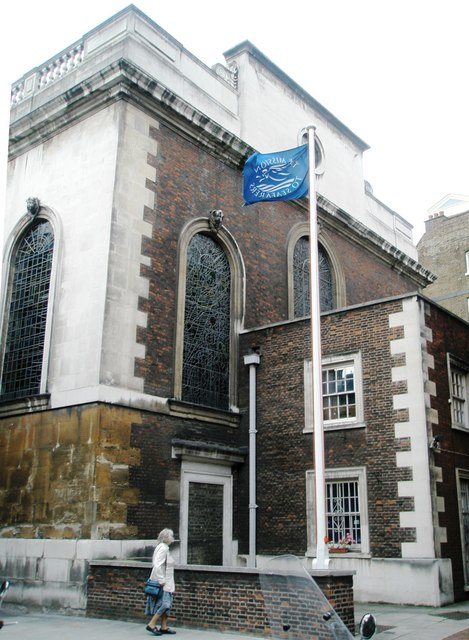
Seamen's Church

The entrance is through the tower in the southwest corner. This has a round-headed window at the lowest level, then a circular window, then a square-headed belfry window. At the top is a pierced parapet with square urns on the corners. The stone spire was designed by Nicholas Hawksmoor and is similar to those of St Stephen Walbrook, St James Garlickhythe and, to a lesser extent, the west towers of St Paul's Cathedral. It is an open octagon formed by eight Ionic columns, each with its own entablature and topped by an urn. Above this is another, smaller, octagon with another eight columns with urns. Above the second octagon is a tiny dome surmounted by a pennant vane. The height of the tower and steeple is 128 ft.

St Michael Paternoster Royal was designated a Grade I listed building on 4 January 1950.

== Interior ==
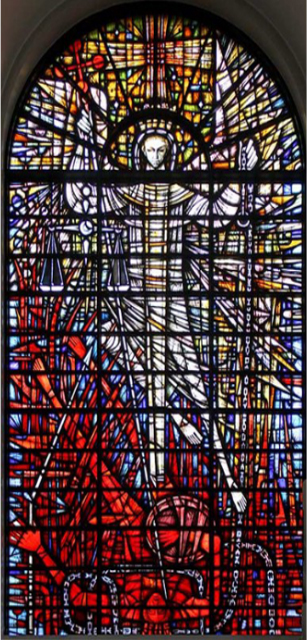
The main stained glass window: St Michael and Satan

St Michael's interior is partitioned, reflecting the church's dual purpose. The west of the building, roughly corresponding with the plan to the original 13th-century church, accommodates a hall, vestibule and the offices of the Mission to Seafarers.

The chapel is housed in the larger, eastern, part of the church. The east wall includes three stained glass windows designed by John Hayward in 1968. The main window depicts St Michael trampling a red-winged Satan. The windows on either side show the Virgin Mary with the infant Jesus and Adam and Eve with St Gabriel and the serpent. On the south wall, another stained glass window depicts Dick Whittington with his cat.

The reredos is original, with four Corinthian columns and two flaming urns. Before it are seventeenth-century Baroque statues of Moses and Aaron, moved here from All-Hallows-the-Great on that church's demolition in 1894: the statues’ hands were blown off in the war and have been replaced; Moses previously held a pointer, indicating the Decalogue, while Aaron held a censer – he now raises his hands in a blessing.

Also from All-Hallows-the-Great is the elaborate chandelier, marked "Birmingham 1644". The organ case is a replica of the 1749 organ case taken from All-Hallows-the-Great but destroyed in the War. It houses a Noel Mander organ, as well as, in front of the organ gallery, a rare contemporary representation of King William III's arms.

The pulpit, communion rails and lectern date from the seventeenth century, but the rest of the woodwork was installed in the 1960s.

== Burials ==
- Richard Whittington (c. 1354–1423), though his tomb is now lost
- Samuel Pennant

== See also ==
- List of churches and cathedrals of London
- List of Christopher Wren churches in London
- John Albert Douglas, vicar of St Michael Paternoster Royal from 1933 to 1952
