= Diocese of The Hague and the Netherlands =

Location
- Territory: Netherlands
- Ecclesiastical province: Patriarchal Exarchate in Western Europe (Moscow Patriarchate)
- Metropolitan: Anthony (Sevryuk)
- Headquarters: The Hague

Information
- Denomination: Eastern Orthodox Church
- Established: 18 August 1972

Current leadership
- Parent church: Russian Orthodox Church
- Bishop of The Hague and the Netherlands: Elisey (Ganaba)

Website
- http://www.russian-diocese.nl/

The Diocese of The Hague and the Netherlands (Russian: Гаагская и Нидерландская епархия, Dutch: Het bisdom van Den Haag en Nederland) is a diocese of the Russian Orthodox Church (ROC) which covers the territory of Netherlands. This diocese is part of the Patriarchal Exarchate in Western Europe since 28 December 2018.

== History ==
=== 1972-2017 ===
In 1972 Bishop Jacob (Akkersdijk) of The Hague, who was a vicar of the Diocese of Western Europe of the Russian Orthodox Church Outside Russia, and led a Dutch Eastern Orthodox mission consisting of three parishes and a monastery, applied for admission of him and his communities into the Moscow Patriarchate. At the same time, two parishes of the Moscow Patriarchate operated in the Netherlands under the direction of Bishop Dionysius (Lukin) of Rotterdam, vicar of the ROC Diocese of Brussels and Belgium.

On August 18, 1972 Bishop Jacob was received into the Moscow Patriarchate with his clergy and flock; the Diocese of The Hague was established within the Western European Exarchate of the Russian Orthodox Church. Bishop Dionysius was dismissed and appointed rector of the stauropegic parish of the icon of the mother of God "the quick-listener" in Rotterdam.

Services in churches and monasteries of the Diocese of The Hague were celebrated in Church Slavonic and Dutch. Bishop Dionysius, Archimandrite Adrian (Korporaal), and Archpriest Alexis Voogd worked on translations of Orthodox liturgical texts into Dutch.

On June 20, 2004, the first Russian Orthodox church in the history of the Netherlands was consecrated in the name of Prince Alexander Nevsky in Rotterdam.

On 28 December 2017, the Holy Synod of the Russian Orthodox Church expressed its gratitude to Archbishop Elisey for his labours in building up church life in the Diocese of Sourozh and gave him a new position of service as primate of the Diocese of The Hague and the Netherlands of the Russian Orthodox Church.

=== Within the PEWE ===
On December 28, 2018, the Diocese of The Hague and Netherlands became part of then-established Patriarchal Exarchate in Western Europe (PEWE).

== Ruling bishops ==
- Jacob (Akkersdijk) (18 August 1972 - 30 December 1988)
- Vladimir (Sabodan) (30 December 1988 - 20 February 1990) locum tenens
- Kirill (Gundyaev) (20 February 1990 - 30 August 1991) locum tenens
- Simon (Ishunin) (30 August 1991 - 28 December 2017) locum tenens
- Elisey (Ganaba) (since 28 December 2017)

== See also ==
- Assembly of Canonical Orthodox Bishops of Belgium, Holland, and Luxembourg
