= Anglican and Eastern Churches Association =

The Anglican and Eastern Churches Association is a religious organisation founded as the Eastern Church Association in 1864 by John Mason Neale and others, with Athelstan Riley being a leading member. The purpose for which it was founded is to pray and work for the reunion of the Eastern Orthodox churches and the Anglican Communion. In 1914, it adopted the present name when it merged with the Anglican and Eastern Orthodox Churches Union. According to tradition, the merger was arranged at a meeting under a railway bridge in Lewisham between the Revd H. J. Fynes-Clinton and the Revd Canon John Albert Douglas. In 1933, a dispute arose between Fynes-Clinton and Fr Robert Corbould on one side and Athelstan Riley and Douglas on the other.

The association publishes Koinonia: the journal of the Anglican and Eastern Churches Association, which continues E.C.N.L. ISSN 0012-8732, previously known as The Christian East, a quarterly magazine from 1920-1954. Additionally, the association issued Stephen Graham's News Letter about the Orthodox Churches in War Time monthly from 1940 to 1943, which was succeeded by the Eastern Churches Broadsheet from 1944 to 1954. After this, came the Eastern Churches News-Letter, from Jan. 1955.

== See also ==
- Fellowship of Saint Alban and Saint Sergius
