= Militsa Zyornova =

Doctor of Medicine, dentist, religious figure

Militsa Vladimirovna Zyornova, née Lavrova (17 August 1899, Tbilisi – 3 February 1994, Oxford) was a Doctor of Medicine, dentist, religious figure, icon painter, author, and wife of the philosopher and theologian Nikolay Zyornov. She was in charge of the house of St. Basil in London and St. Gregory of Nyssa at Oxford.

== Life ==
Militsa Lavrova was born on 17 August in Tbilisi. She graduated from the Lewandowsky gymnasium in Tbilisi in 1917 and entered Moscow University. In 1921, she left for France to continue her education. Lavrova arrived to Marseilles from Batumi hoping to receive education in France. In order to pay for education she had to work as a babysitter, massage therapist, and dentist.

In 1927, Lavrova married Nikolay Zyornov in the church of Orthodox Theological Institute of St. Sergei. From 1925 to 1932, Zyornova was a Secretary of the Russian Student Christian Movement in Paris. In 1930, she graduated from the Paris University. At that time, her husband Nikolay left for Oxford on a modest scholarship and Zyornova had to stay in Paris to work as an assistant for an American dentist. In 1932, Zyornova defended her doctoral dissertation on the topic "Treatment of parrhea with ultraviolet rays".

In 1934 Zyornova joined her husband in Oxford. Along with her husband Nikolay, Zyornova created an Orthodox Center with a chapel for regular services, a hall for lectures and meetings, and a student residence in Oxford. After her husband's death in 1980, Zyornova took care of the center.

She was in charge of the house of St. Basil in London and St. Gregory of Nyssa at Oxford. Thanks to Zyornova and her husband, the History of the Orthodox religion was included in the university syllabus.

== Publications ==
In 1973 jointly with her husband Zyornova published a book “Za rubezhom: Belgrad, Paris, Oxford: khronika semii Zyornovyh, 1921-1972” about their life abroad.

In 1974, the Zyornovs published an article “Youth Christian movement in exile” in the “Bulletin of the Russian Student Christian Movement Abroad”.

She and her husband wrote The Fellowship of St Alban and St Sergius: a Historical Memoir in 1979 to commemorate the 50th anniversary of the fellowship.

Together with her husband, Zyornova wrote a book “Zakatnye gody: Epilog khroniki semii Zyornovyh” (1981) and even more efforts were made to prepare its English edition “Zakatnye gody: Russkiy palomnik na Zapade” (1983).

Militsa Zyornova died on 3 February 1994 in Oxford.
