= Basil Osborne =

Former bishop of the Moscow Patriarchate then of the Patriarchate of Constantinople

Alfred Herbert Ernest Osborne, formerly known as Basil Osborne (born 12 April 1938), is a former Eastern Orthodox Christian bishop. Osborne was formerly an auxiliary bishop of the Patriarchate of Moscow from 1991 to 2006 and a titular bishop under the Ecumenical Patriarchate from 2006 to 2010. He was returned to lay status, at his own request, in February 2010 after indicating to the Holy Synod of the Patriarchate of Constantinople that he wished to resume a family life and be free to remarry (having been married and widowed prior to his consecration as a bishop).

Osborne held the position of Bishop of Sergievo as a bishop of the Russian Orthodox Church and the position of Bishop of Amphipolis within the Ecumenical Patriarchate, in which he served as an assistant bishop in its Patriarchal Exarchate for Orthodox Parishes of Russian Tradition in Western Europe, charged with the care of its people in Great Britain and Ireland.

== Biography ==
Osborne was born in Alexandria, Egypt, in 1938, and grew up in the United States. He was introduced to Orthodoxy in 1957 by Father Michael Gelsinger, Professor of Classics at the University at Buffalo, New York. Osborne married his wife, Rachel, in 1962, after a time of service in the US Army. He received his doctorate (in classics) from the University of Cincinnati, Ohio, in 1969. His wife died in 1991.

Osborne was ordained to the diaconate by Metropolitan Anthony of Sourozh (Moscow Patriarchate) in 1969 and priest in 1973, serving the Russian Orthodox Parish of the Annunciation in Oxford. Following his wife's death in 1991 he was consecrated in 1993 as Bishop of Sergievo in the Moscow Patriarchate, to assist Metropolitan Anthony of Sourozh. Following Metropolitan Anthony's death in 2003, he was appointed temporary administrator of the Diocese of Sourozh until 2006.

=== Departure from the Russian Orthodox Church: 2006 ===
In 2006, Osborne left the Patriarchate of Moscow and sought reception into the Ecumenical Patriarchate of Constantinople, which caused much controversy and ecclesiastical friction. After a lengthy dispute between the two patriarchates over the situation and the canonical questions raised by a bishop who seeks entry into a new jurisdiction without release from his current patriarchate, the situation was eventually resolved and Osborne was received into the Ecumenical Patriarchate as a titular bishop with the title of Bishop of Amphipolis. As with all other titular bishops in the Ecumenical Patriarchate who do not have sees, he was technically known as one of the "bishops of the throne" (i.e. a bishop who is not head of a diocese).

Osborne's reception into the Ecumenical Patriarchate came at the end of a period of intense controversy. He was forcibly retired from his position as administrator of the Sourozh diocese after seeking incardination into the Ecumenical Patriarchate without receiving release from Moscow. In a letter sent to the Patriarch of Moscow without notice to his clergy, Osborne requested that he and the whole of the Diocese of Sourozh (not simply the members who wished to follow him) be released from the jurisdiction of the Moscow Patriarchate in order to be received into the jurisdiction of the Ecumenical Patriarch as a new diocese existing alongside Constantinople's Patriarchal Exarchate for Orthodox Parishes of Russian Tradition in Western Europe. Without awaiting a full response from the Patriarchate of Moscow, he wrote to the Ecumenical Patriarch on 2 May 2006, again repeating his desire to establish a new diocese under Constantinople. Announcement of Osborne's retirement by the Synod of Moscow followed upon his refusal to withdraw this letter to Constantinople. On 9 May 2006, Patriarch Alexy II issued a decree saying Osborne was relieved of his duties as administrator of the Diocese of Sourozh. On 16 May 2006, Osborne appealed the decision to the Ecumenical Patriarchate on the basis of Canons 9 and 17 of the Fourth Ecumenical Council and also Canon 28 of the same council. Such canons, some argue, endow the Constantinopolitan Patriarch with the privilege of the ekkliton (read, hearing appeal) and grant it jurisdiction over regions not already subject to the other four senior patriarchates, Rome, Alexandria, Antioch and Jerusalem. This interpretation of these canons is not undisputed and runs contrary to the classical interpretations of the canons found in the canonical commentaries of the Church. (Note: For a canonical commentary on this canon, see: Prerogatives of the Ecumenical Patriarchate. As an example of the variances in interpretation, regarding Canon 9 of Chalcedon, St Nicodemos of the Holy Mountain comments: "[This canon] did not say that if any clergyman has a dispute or difference with the Metropolitan of any diocese or parish whatever, they must be tried before the Bishop of Constantinople…." Zonaras likewise says that the Bishop of Constantinople is not necessarily entitled to sit as judge over all Metropolitans, but (only) over those who are judicially subject to him, and that "The Bishop of Constantinople must hear the appeals only of those who are subject to the Bishop of Constantinople, precisely as the Bishop of Rome must hear the appeals only of those who are subject to the Bishop of Rome." In D. Cummings, trans., The Rudder of the Orthodox Catholic Church: The Compilation of the Holy Canons Saints Nicodemus and Agapius, West Brookfield, MA: The Orthodox Christian Educational Society, 1983, p. 255.)

Osborne's request to have himself and his diocese received into the Ecumenical Patriarchate as a new diocese was not granted by that body; however, the Ecumenical Patriarchate subsequently accepted him into its jurisdiction on the basis of his appeal which followed, although Moscow had not issued a canonical release and had instructed him not to be received into another patriarchate until matters could be looked into by an appropriate commission. Additionally, it requested his presence in person numerous times, which Osborne always refused to heed, instructing others to do likewise. Given these circumstances, the Moscow Patriarchate did not regard his incardination into the Ecumenical Patriarchate as valid, nor did it recognise the title "Bishop of Amphipolis" given to him by the Holy Synod of the Patriarchate of Constantinople on 8 June 2006. Considering him still a bishop of the Russian Orthodox Church, but in retirement, it referred to him in official correspondence without titular connection, as 'The Right Reverend Bishop Basil (Osborne)'. Similarly, it did not regard as valid the 'letters of release' issued by Osborne to his former clergy in the Diocese of Sourozh, which had either been backdated or prepared earlier, in early February. Osborne was summoned to appear before the Moscow Patriarchate synod on 17 July but declined to appear. From 19 July 2006 the Synod of the Moscow Patriarchate placed him under temporary suspension, forbidding him "from celebrating divine services until his repentance or until the decision of the matter by a court of bishops".

The resolutions of the Moscow Patriarchate of 19 July 2006 therefore made Osborne's canonical stature a matter of intense dispute between Moscow and Constantinople. According to the Ecumenical Patriarchate, Osborne could legitimately celebrate as a bishop; according to Moscow, he was forbidden to do so. Accordingly, no communicant of the Moscow Patriarchate who wished to remain faithful to the decisions of his hierarchy could knowingly participate in a liturgy at which Osborne celebrated as a bishop, nor could they receive Holy Communion from him. Similarly, after these resolutions, no Moscow Patriarchate priest could concelebrate with Osborne.

The patriarchates of Alexandria (19 June 2006) and Jerusalem (6 June), along with the Church of Cyprus (14 June) and the Albanian Orthodox Church (12 August)—all of whom have close social, ecclesiastical and political ties to the Ecumenical Patriarchate—later confirmed their support of its authority to act in the manner that it had. (Note: Refer to ORDOs of the Ecumenical Patriarchate, the latest being that of 2006, for the official designation of titular bishops as "bishops/hierarchs" of the "Throne" and to the text of canons 9, 17 and 28 for the rights and privileges of Constantinople regarding extraterritorial appeals and jurisdiction in the "varvariki", regions beyond the borders of the other senior patriarchates.) The ruling archbishop of the Church of Greece publicly "deplored" Constantinople's decision to accept Osborne into its jurisdiction and in this context expressed regret at both "emerging threats to constructive co-operation between local ethnic diasporas" and "violations of Church order and troubles, harmful primarily to the unity of the Holy Orthodox Churches."

In March 2007 negotiations took place in Geneva between representatives of the two patriarchates (Moscow and Constantinople). These concluded with the Holy Synod of the Moscow Patriarchate releasing Osborne from its jurisdiction on 27 March. Commenting to the media on the synod's decision, Metropolitan Kyrill of Smolensk and Kaliningrad, chairman of the Moscow Patriarchate's Department of External Church Relations, said that "The problem arose because Bishop Basil went over to Constantinople without any request from Constantinople and without any consent from the Moscow Patriarchate. Now Constantinople has requested his documents, which customarily include a letter of release. This means that the Moscow Patriarchate has granted Bishop Basil a canonical leave."

In response to this, Osborne wrote:

"On Wednesday, 27 March 2007, the Holy Synod of the Patriarchate of Moscow decided to accede to the request of the Patriarchate of Constantinople and to forward my personal dossier to His Holiness Patriarch Bartholomew. This means that they have accepted the situation as it is, i.e. that I am a bishop in good standing within the Ecumenical Patriarchate and that from their point of view there is no longer any problem about their clergy celebrating with me or with the clergy under me. This is a welcome move - though one that could have been made many months ago. It restores normal relations between the Patriarchates and will make life easier for us all."

=== Ecumenical Patriarchate: 2006–2009 ===
As Bishop of Amphipolis, Osborne was appointed assistant bishop within the Ecumenical Patriarchate's Archdiocese of Parishes of the Russian Tradition in Western Europe (i.e. the 'Exarchate'), under the headship of Archbishop Gabriel of Komana. In his brief time as assistant bishop in the Exarchate, Basil's authority was over a newly formed vicariate of parishes in the British Isles who had followed him in his departure from the Russian Orthodox Church into the Ecumenical Patriarchate. This body was given the title Episcopal Vicariate of Great Britain and Ireland, and consisted of some twelve parishes and some smaller Eucharistic Communities (details are disputed: these are enumerated and discussed here). As part of this role, he sat on the council of the Exarchate.

The Vicariate, as it existed under its vicar-bishop, was made up of a number of full-time parishes and some parishes and communities that meet less frequently. It was created by an act of the Council of the Archdiocese during an extraordinary meeting held on 9 June 2006, one day after the Holy Synod of the Patriarchate of Constantinople had met (8 June 2006) and issued a statement receiving Bishop Basil of Sergievo into the Patriarchate of Constantinople – an act that caused substantial controversy, as he had not been released from the Moscow Patriarchate. The same statement gave Bishop Basil the new title, Bishop of Amphipolis (taken from an ancient see in Greece that no longer has a bishop), and charged him with the care of parishes in Great Britain and Ireland, as auxiliary bishop under Archbishop Gabriel of Komana in Paris. At that time, no such parishes existed. After his appointment a number of parishes and communities, as well as some of the clergy and laity of the Diocese of Sourozh, followed Bishop Basil into the Archdiocese and came to constitute the Episcopal Vicariate. Other parishes and communities were formed later, where none had previously existed, for example in Cumbria, and Northampton.

Bishop Basil's first liturgical service as a member of the Archdiocese was a concelebration of the Divine Liturgy with Archbishop Gabriel in the Alexander Nevsky Cathedral in Paris on 18 June 2006. Statutes were adopted by the Episcopal Vicariate on 23 June 2007, and the Vicariate was registered as a charity (registration number 1124252) on 29 May 2008.

== Retirement ==
In 2009, Osborne requested retirement and announced to his local clergy that he would retire at the end of November, giving as his own reasons his age and desire to spend more time with his family.

Bishop Basil announced his retirement in a letter to parishioners on 1 September 2009, stating in that letter that he intended to retire on 28 November 2009, the same day that the Archdiocesan Council would meet to, presumably, discuss the Vicariate's future. However, when the Council met on 23 September 2009, under the presidency of Archbishop Gabriel, it moved Bishop Basil's retirement forward, to be effective from 12 October 2009. In its communique No. 05-09 (dated 23 September), it noted that Bishop Basil "will not have any further pastoral, liturgical or administrative mission in the Vicariate" from his retirement. Archbishop Gabriel made clear that the life of the [Vicariate's] parishes and communities in Great Britain and Ireland "are continuing, and that new communities are in formation and the ordinations of new clerics in preparation."

Osborne's retirement from active ecclesiastical office was accompanied by retirement as rector of the Parish of the Annunciation in Oxford. The episcopal vicariate that he had formerly headed was changed to the status of a deanery within the archdiocese.

== Return to lay status ==
In early 2010, Osborne petitioned the Patriarchate of Constantinople for a return to lay status "to enable him to have a family home with the possibility of marrying again". This petition was granted, although the precise terms of the decree of the Holy Synod bringing about the return to lay status have not been published. Osborne's approach to the Ecumenical Patriarch was effected, at his request, by his ruling archbishop, Gabriel of Comana. On 20 February 2010 Archbishop Gabriel informed members of his archdiocese that the decision to "return Bishop Basil to lay status" had been made the previous week.

== Notes ==
Eastern Orthodox Church titles
Preceded by Anthony of Sourozh	Bishop of Sourozh; Diocese of Sourozh (Moscow Patriarchate); August 2003-9 May 2006	Succeeded by Innocent (Vasiliev) (locum tenens)
Preceded by ?	Bishop of Amphipolis; Ecumenical Patriarchate; 8 June 2006 — 12 February 2010	Succeeded by ?
