= Anthony of Sourozh =

Russian Orthodox bishop and author (1914–2003)

His Eminence Anthony of Sourozh
- Bishop of the Russian Orthodox Diocese of Sourozh
- Other post: Exarch of the Russian Orthodox Church in Western Europe

Orders
- Ordination: 1948
- Consecration: 1957

Personal details
- Born: Andrei Borisovich Bloom; 19 June 1914 Lausanne, Switzerland
- Died: 4 August 2003 (aged 89)
- Denomination: Eastern Orthodox
- Residence: London, England

Anthony of Sourozh (Russian: Митрополит Антоний Сурожский, secular name Andrei Borisovich Bloom, Russian: Андрей Борисович Блум and commonly known as Anthony Bloom; 19 June 1914 – 4 August 2003) was best known as a writer and broadcaster on prayer and the Christian life. He was a monk and bishop of the Russian Orthodox Church. He was founder and for many years bishop - then archbishop, then metropolitan - of the Diocese of Sourozh, the Patriarchate of Moscow's diocese for Great Britain and Ireland (the name 'Sourozh' is that of the historical episcopal see in Sudak in Crimea). As a bishop he became well known as a pastor, preacher, spiritual director and writer on prayer and the Christian life.

== Early life ==
Andrei Bloom was born on 19 June 1914, in Lausanne, Switzerland, to Russian parents Xenia and Boris Edvardovich Bloom. His mother was the half sister of the composer Alexander Scriabin.

He spent his early childhood in Russia and Iran. During the Russian Revolution the family had to leave Iran, and by 1923 they were settled in Paris, where he was educated. He graduated in physics, chemistry and biology, and took his doctorate in medicine at the University of Paris in 1943.

By his own words, he met Christ, when he was a teenager:

"I met Christ as a Person at a moment when I needed him in order to live, and at a moment when I was not in search of him. I was found; I did not find him".

"I was a teenager then. Life had been difficult in the early years and now it had of a sudden become easier. All the years when life had been hard I had found it natural, if not easy, to fight; but when life became easy and happy I was faced quite unexpectedly with a problem: I could not accept aimless happiness. Hardships and suffering had to be overcome, there was something beyond them. Happiness seemed to be stale if it had no further meaning".

"As it often happens when you are young and when you act with passion, bent to possess either everything or nothing, I decided that I would give myself a year to see whether life had a meaning, and if I discovered it had none I would not live beyond the year..."--

== Career ==
In 1939, before leaving for the front as a surgeon in the French Army, he secretly professed monastic vows in the Russian Orthodox Church. In 1943 he was tonsured and received the name of Antony. During the occupation of France by Nazi Germany he worked as a doctor, and took part in the French Resistance.

After the war he continued practising as a physician until 1948, when he was ordained to the presbyterate and sent to Britain to serve as Orthodox Christian chaplain of the Fellowship of Saint Alban and Saint Sergius, a society established to foster understanding and friendship between the Russian Orthodox and Anglican churches. In 1950 he was appointed vicar of the Russian Patriarchal parish in London.

In 1957 he was consecrated as bishop, and as archbishop in 1962 in charge of the Russian Orthodox Diocese of Sourozh (for Great Britain and Ireland).

In 1963 he was appointed exarch of the Moscow Patriarchate in Western Europe, and in 1966 was assigned the rank of metropolitan bishop.

In 1974 he protested the expulsion of writer Aleksandr Solzhenitsyn from Russia and renounced his exarch post during a radio broadcast. He continued to write and between 1966 and 1986 he brought out six books on prayer.

On February 1, 2003, he applied for retirement for health reasons, and on July 30, 2003, by a decree of the Holy Synod of the Russian Orthodox Church, he was relieved of the administration of the Sourozh diocese and retired. He died on 4 August 2003 and was buried in the Brompton Cemetery, London.

== Honours ==
Bloom received honorary doctorates from the University of Aberdeen ("for preaching the Word of God and renewing the spiritual life of this country"); from the Moscow Theological Academy for his theological, pastoral and preaching work; from the University of Cambridge; and from the Kiev Theological Academy.

== Writings ==
His books were published in English in Britain. His texts were subsequently widely published in Russia as books and in periodicals.

- Note: dates are for British editions.

Publications

- 1966 – Living Prayer
- 1970 – School for Prayer
- 1970 – Beginning to Pray (re-publishing of School for Prayer)
- 1971 – God and man
- 1972 – Meditations on a Theme: a spiritual journey
- 1973 – Courage to Pray
- 1985 – Death and Bereavement
- 1986 – The Essence of Prayer (Contains Living Prayer, School for Prayer, God and Man, and Courage to Pray)

Posthumously published works

- 2005 – Encounter
- 2007 – The Living Body of Christ
- 2009 – Coming Closer to Christ: on Confession
- 2017 – Churchianity vs. Christianity
- Living the Christian Creed: Theology as Encounter
- Beauty and Meaning: T S Eliot Lectures

== Posthumous works ==
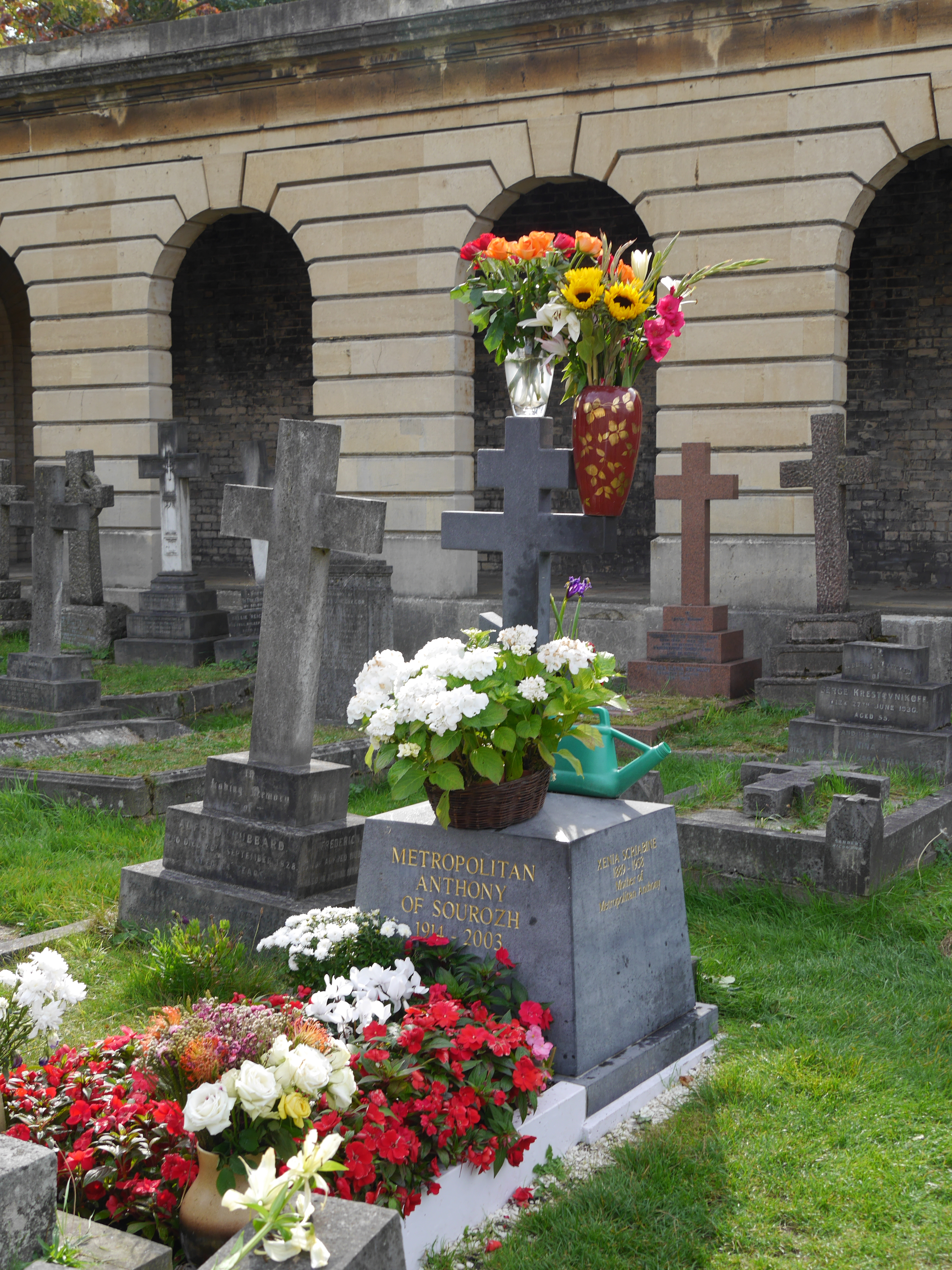
Anthony of Sourozh's funerary monument, Brompton Cemetery, London

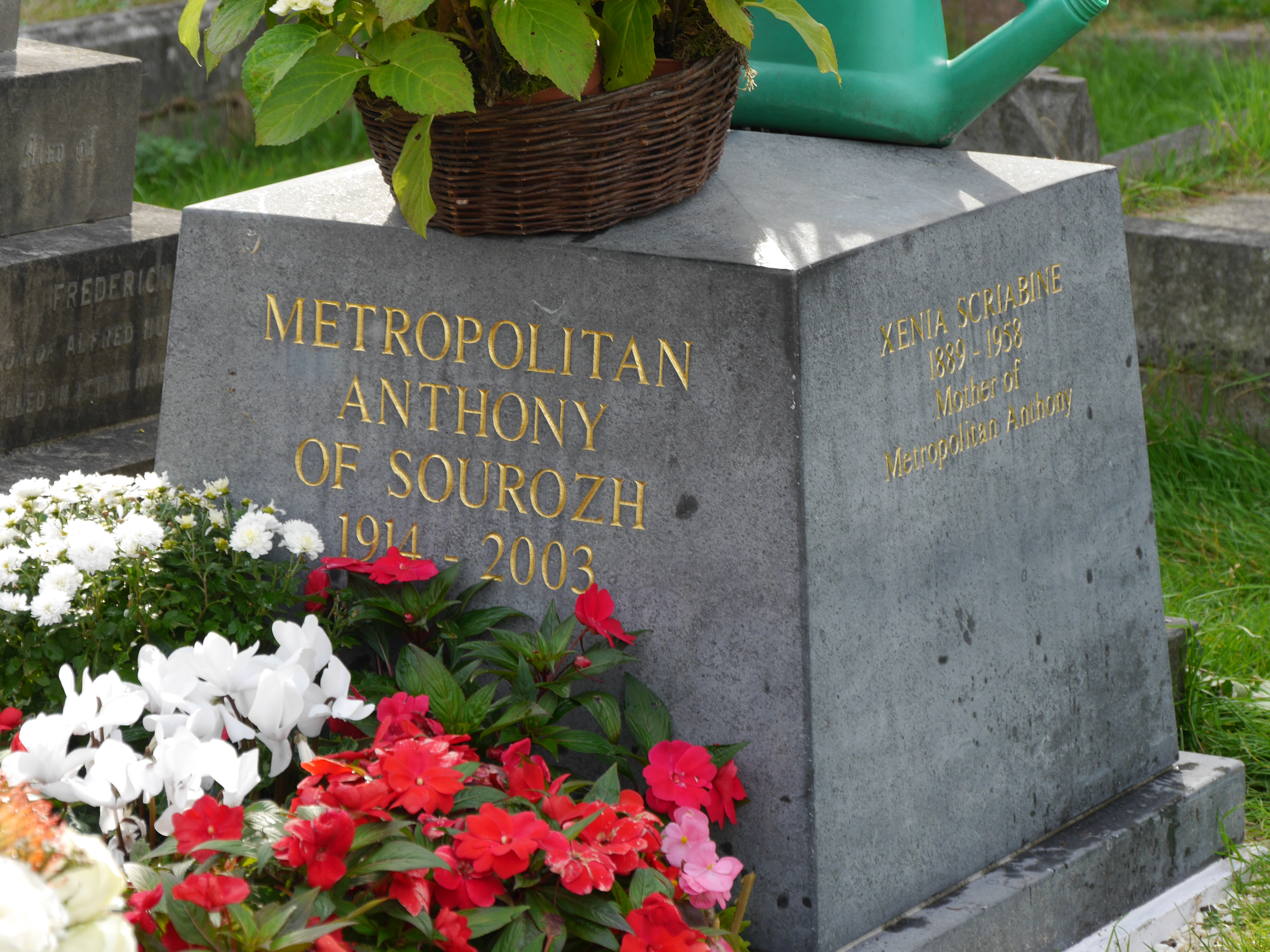
Detail

The Metropolitan Anthony of Sourozh Foundation is a body of independent trustees who collect together and publish his writings. As of July 2011, the foundation undertakes this by managing the copyrights in his works and by commissioning new selections and approved translations.

The foundation is also establishing the official archive of Bloom's papers and writings, together with related materials such as recordings of talks, broadcasts and sermons.

The foundation is the legal owner of the worldwide copyrights and other intellectual property rights in Bloom's works. Its charity registered number is 1120395.
