= Diocese of Berlin and Germany (Russian Orthodox Church) =

Section of the Russian Orthodox church

Eparchy of Berlin and Germany Berliner Diözese der Russischen Orthodoxen Kirche Берлинская и Германская епархия Русской православной церкви
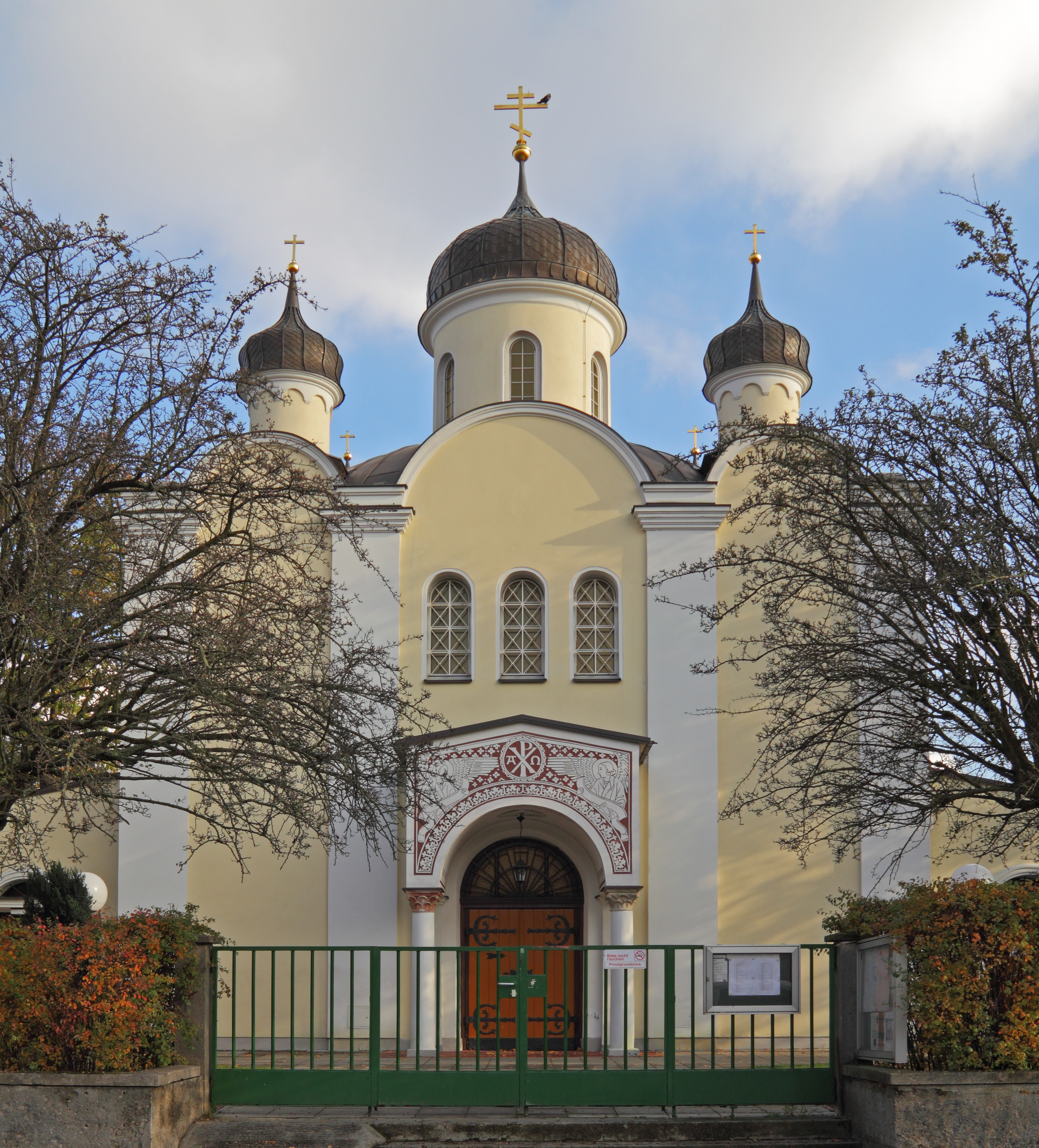
- Resurrection Cathedral, Berlin

Location
- Country: Germany
- Deaneries: Deanery of Bavaria and Hessen; Eastern Deanery; Western Deanery; Northern Deanery; Southern Deanery
- Headquarters: Wildensteiner Str. 10, 10318 Berlin
- Coordinates: 52°28′48″N 13°31′22″E

Statistics
- Parishes: 109 (21 parishes with permanent churches, including the cathedral; 63 other parishes; 25 communities)

Information
- Denomination: Russian Orthodox Church
- Established: 1921
- Cathedral: Resurrection Cathedral
- Secular priests: 69
- Language: Church Slavonic, German
- Calendar: Julian Calendar
- Major Archbishop: Tikhon (Zaitsev)

Website
- http://www.rokmp.de/

The Diocese of Berlin and Germany (German: Berliner Diözese der Russischen Orthodoxen Kirche, Russian: Берлинская и Германская епархия Русской православной церкви) is an eparchy of the Russian Orthodox Church (ROC), Moscow Patriarchate, uniting parishes on the territory of Germany. It was established in 1921. The eparchy is divided into five deaneries: Northern, Eastern, Bavarian and Hessen, Southern, and Western.

The Resurrection Cathedral in Berlin is the main cathedral of the eparchy. The eparchy is headed by Tikhon (Zaitsev) since 2017.

== History ==
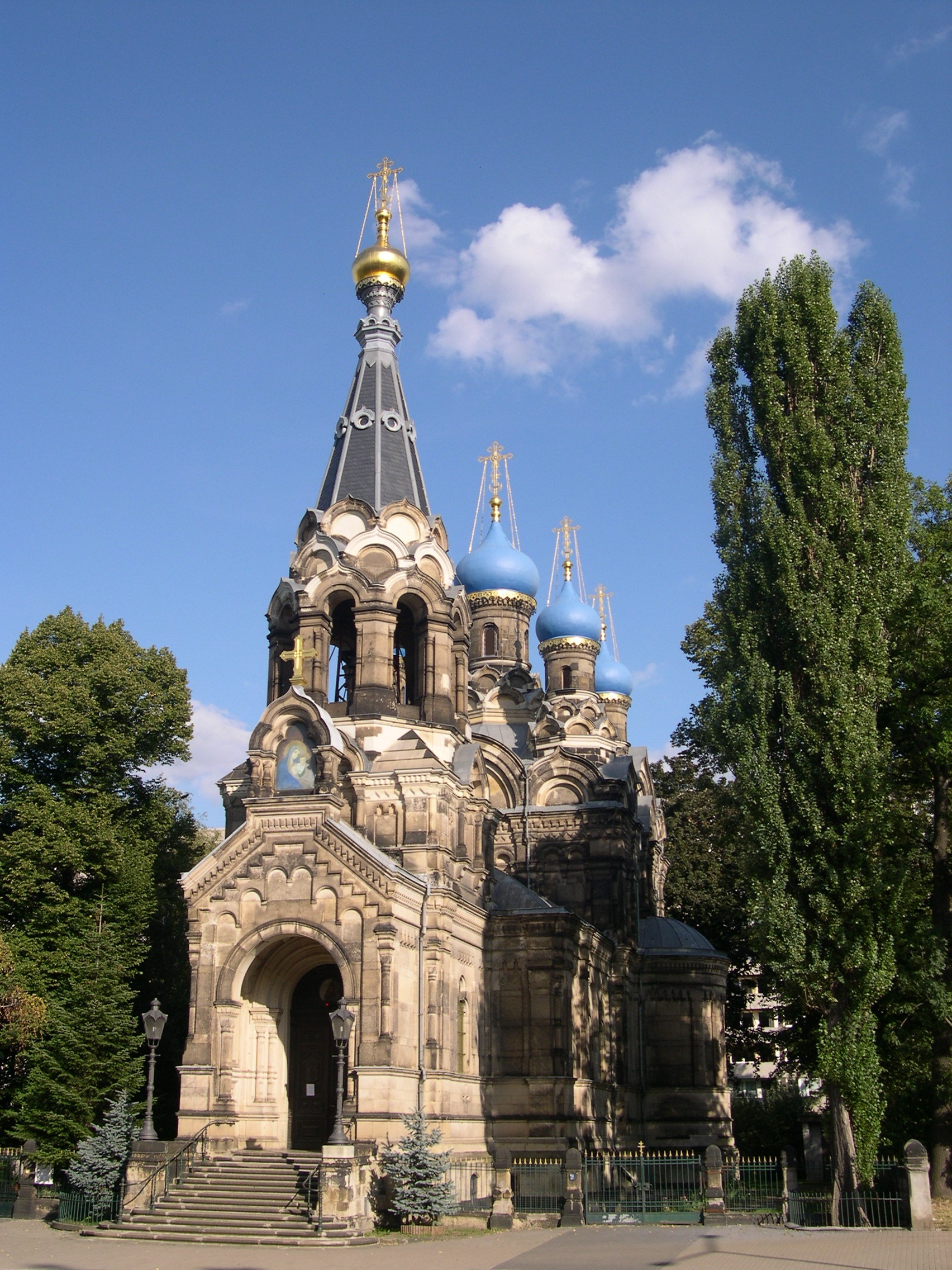
St. Simeon of the Wonderful Mountain Church, Dresden

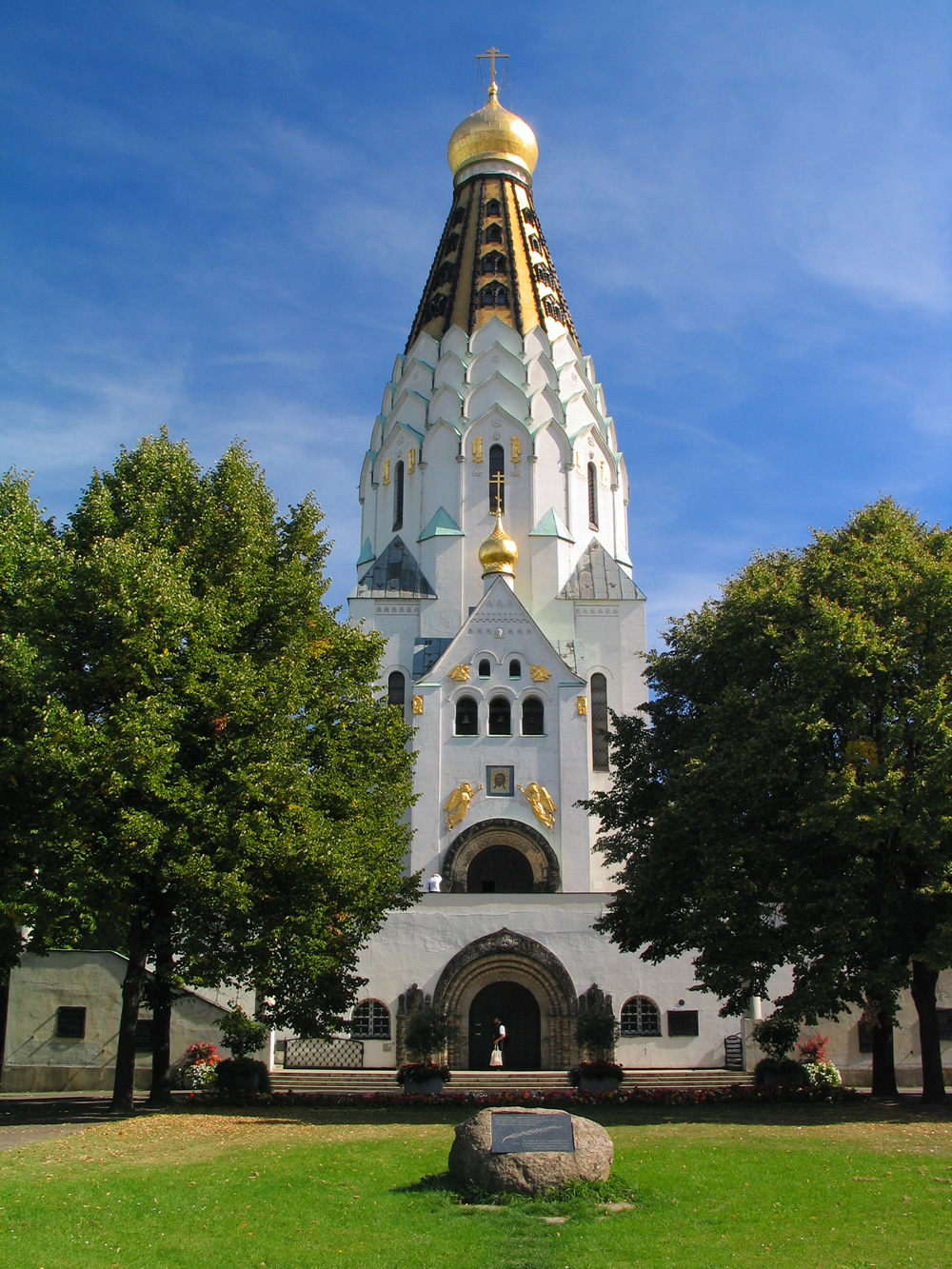
Russian Memorial Church of Saint Alexius, Leipzig

In the 18th and 19th centuries Eastern Orthodox parishes and churches on the territory of Germany were established mainly near Russian diplomatic offices and areas with significant number of Russians foreign nationals, especially in spa cities. The new parishes helped to build close relationships between the ruling dynasty and the aristocracy.

After the revolutions in 1917, a large diaspora of Russian Orthodox people emigrated to Germany. On 8 April 1921, Patriarch Tikhon, citing the regulation of the Highest Church Authority from 19 November 1920, assigned archbishop Eulogius (Georgiyevsky), one of many Russian emigres, the leadership of Western Europe. The temporal residence of Eulogius and archimandrite Tikhon (Lyashchenko) became the Alexandrov refuge in Berlin.

Under Eulogius, Russian Orthodox communities were founded in Berlin, Tegel, Dresden, Wiesbaden, Bad Kissingen, Baden-Baden and Hamburg. Other parishes were founded in prison camps and refugee settlements in Wünsdorf, Quedlinburg, Lichtenhorst and Scheuen. After the signing of the peace treaty between the Soviet Union and Germany, the independence from the German government resulted in the handover of churches to the Russian parishes. However, the lack of rooms for the parishes was a major problem for the diaspora. For example, prior to the peace treaty the liturgy in Berlin was performed at the former St. Vladimir ambassador church, but the Soviet regime closed the building and the parish had to use private rooms.

Tensions between the head of the Russian Orthodox Church Outside Russia (ROCOR) Anthony (Khrapovitsky) and the metropolitan Eulogius, who from 1922 lived in Paris, resulted to a break of Russian Orthodox parishes in Germany. At the ROCOR Bishops' Council in Sremski Karlovci in June 1926 it was decided that Tikhon (Lyashchenko) would rule over the Germany Diocese. Almost all parishes in Germany were now under the jurisdiction of the ROCOR.

After Adolf Hitler's coming to power in 1933, the government exerted pressure to the parishes of Eulogius, who on 10 June 1931 was dismissed by Sergius (Stragorodsky) and later changed the jurisdiction to the Ecumenical Patriarchate of Constantinople, and ordered to subordinate to the bishop of Berlin Tikhon (Lyashchenko).

After Second World War and Germany's capitulation ROCOR parishes gradually switched to the ROC. Since October 1946, Eastern Orthodox parishes of the Moscow Patriarchate in Germany joined the newly formed Middle-European Exarchate of ROC, which was headed by archbishop Sergius (Korolyov). On 11 November 1954, German parishes joined the West-European Exarchate of ROC, following the Holy Synod ruling "Deaneries of Russian Orthodox churches in Germany". The Berlin Diocese was re-established on 15 August 1957, and since 1960 was the eparchial center of the Middle-European Exarchate.

From 1952 to 1954 the eparchy began publishing its journal The Voice of Orthodoxy (Голос православия) in Russian. The publication was revived in May 1961, now in German language and under the German title Stimme der Orthodoxie. Commissioned by the Middle-European Exarchate of ROC, its aim was to "introduce the readers to events inside the ROC, and foremost to the church life of orthodox parishes in Germany and the Exarchate". The journal published articles, notes, receptions about such themes as inter-religious affairs and works of foreign theologians about Orthodoxy.

On 24 February 1971, the Holy Synod of ROC decided to extract the Baden and Bavaria Diocese from the Berlin Diocese on the federal states Bavaria and Baden-Württemberg, and the Düsseldorf Diocese on the states Bremen, Hamburg, Hessen, Lower Saxony, Rhineland-Palatinate, Saarland, North Rhine-Westphalia and Schleswig-Holstein. The seven remaining parishes in Berlin, Weimar, Dresden, Leipzig and Potsdam went to the Berlin Diocese.

With the Bishop's Council's decision from 30–31 January 1990, all foreign exarchates of the ROC, including the Western-European Exarchate, were abolished, and the eparchies which belonged to the exarchate now were under subordination of the Patriarch and the Synod, meaning directly to the Department for External Church Relations (DECR). After the liquidation of the Western-European Exarchate, the eparchy was renamed Berlin and Leipzig Diocese. On 23 December 1992 the Synod decided to unite the three eparchies (Berlin and Leipzig, Baden and Bavaria, Düsseldorf) into the Berlin and Germany Diocese. By 1993, there were 18 parishes of the Berlin and Germany Diocese.

On 21 March 1996, the Berlin Diocese went to the Budapest and Hungary Diocese of the Moscow Patriarchate, which before that was governed by the DECR.

From the early 90s until the mid-2000s over 300 thousand emigrants from Russia and former USSR states moved to Germany, many of whom were Orthodox Christians. From 1992 to 2007 the number of parishes increased from 12 to 61. The number of Russian Orthodox Christians in 2000 was over 50 thousand. By January 2002, the eparchy consisted of 42 parishes, 22 churches, 33 priests and 8 deacons. In 2008, the first male ROC monastery, the St. George Monastery, was founded in Götschendorf.

Orthodox associations and organizations within the eparchy include the Sisterhood of St. Tsarina Alexandra Fyodorovna and the Center of Integration "ABC". The eparchy is active in missionary and charity. Five departments are working within the eparchy: The Liturgical Commission, Woman Department, Youth Department, Inter-Religious Affairs Department and the Pilgrimage Department.

== Храмы ==
- Церковь Константина и Елены (Берлин)
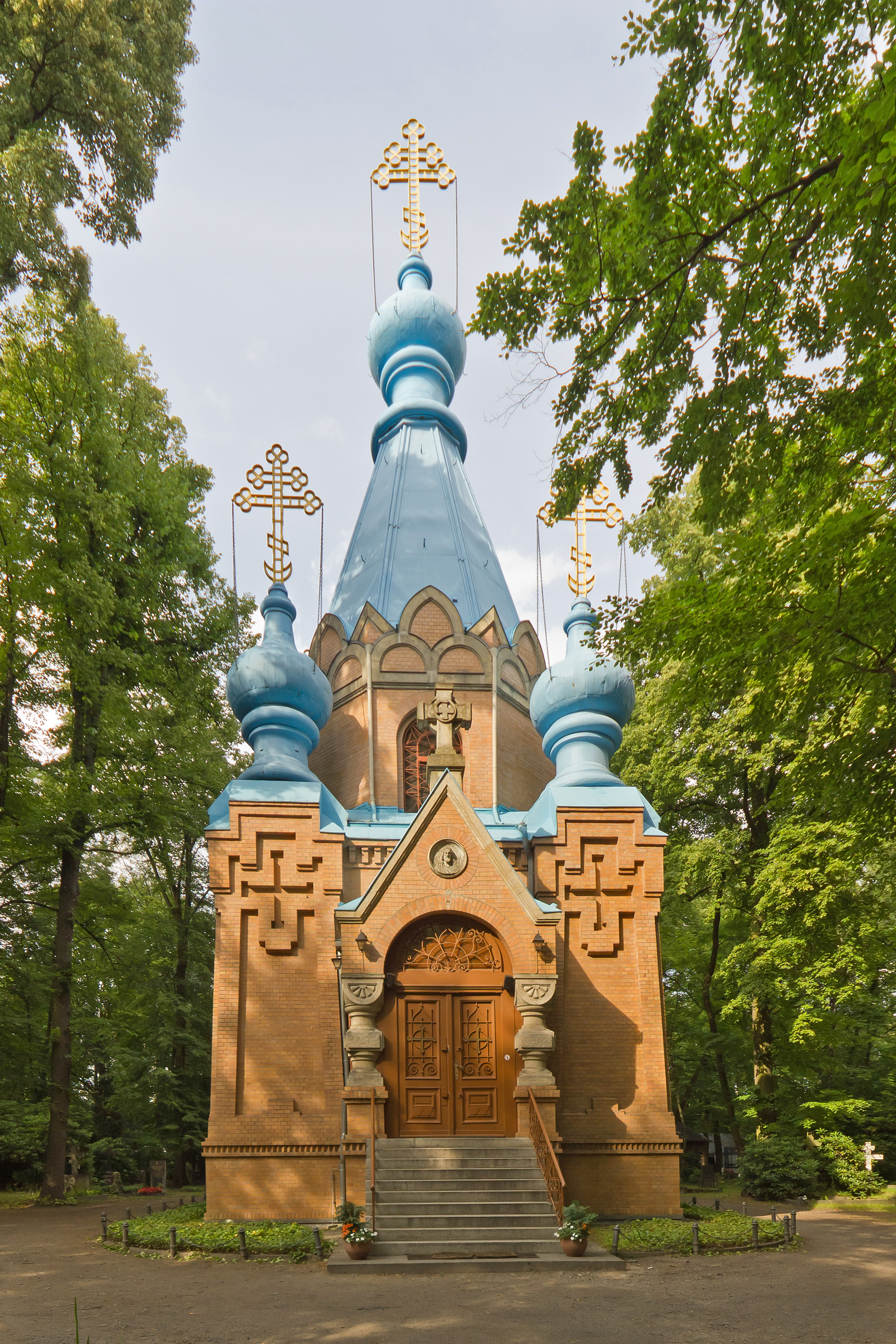
Церковь в Берлине-Тегеле

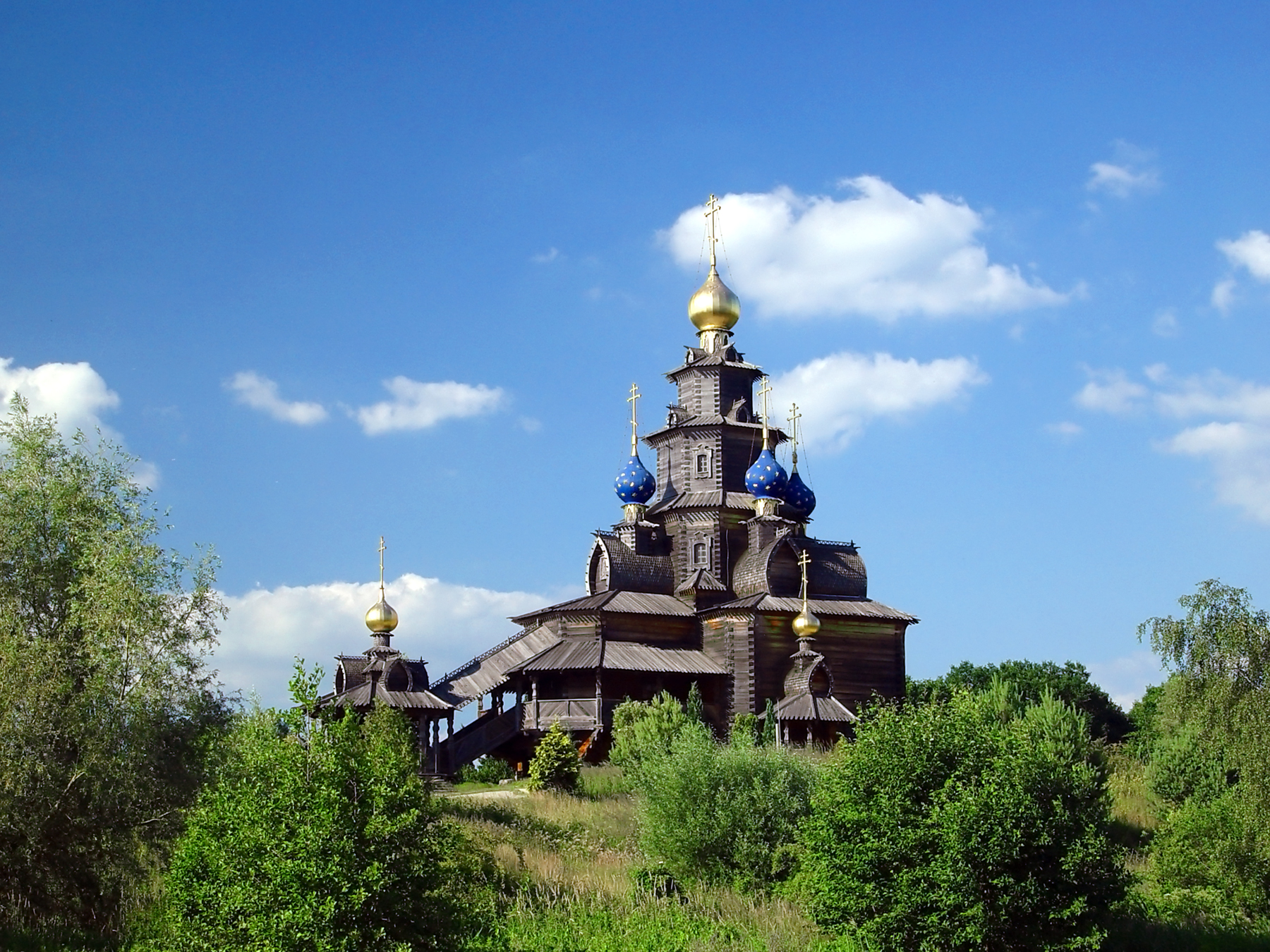
Церковь в Гифхорне

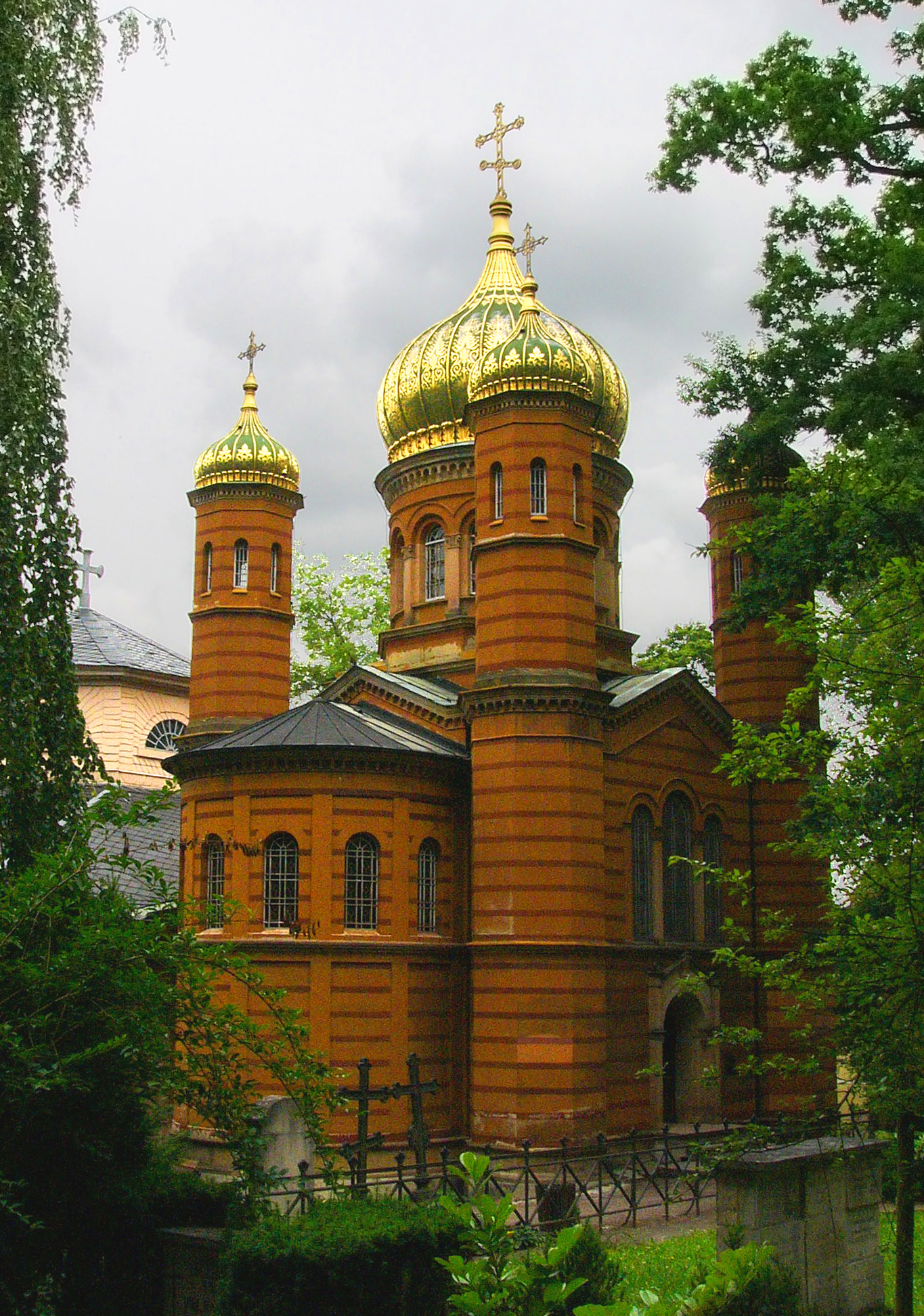
Церковь в Веймаре

-->

== Eparchs ==
- abp. Alexander (Nemolovsky) (October 1945 – 16 November 1948)
- abp. Sergius (Korolyov) (16 November 1948 – 26 September 1950)
- abp. Boris (Bik) (26 September 1950 – 15 October 1954)
- bp. Nicholas (Eryomin) (11 November 1954 – 15 August 1957), archbishop of Clichy, exarch of Western Europe
- bp. Michael (Chub) (15 August 1957 – 6 March 1959)
- bp. John (Razumov) (6 March 1959 – 21 June 1960)
- abp. John (Wendland) (30 June 1960 – 16 June 1962)
- vic. Philaret (Denisenko) (16 June – 10 October 1962)
- abp. Sergius (Larin) (10 October 1962 – 20 May 1964)
- abp. Cyprian (Zyornov) (20 March 1964 – 23 July 1966)
- vic. Jonathan (Kopolovich) (23 July 1966 – 7 October 1967)
- abp. Vladimir (Kotlyarov) (7 October 1967 – 1 December 1970)
- abp. Leontius (Gudimov) (1 December 1970 – 18 April 1973)
- met. Philaret (Vakhromeyev) (18 April 1973 – 10 October 1978)
- abp. Melchizedek (Lebedev) (10 October 1978 – 26 December 1984)
- abp. Theodosius (Protsyuk) (26 December 1984 – 29 July 1986)
- abp. Herman (Timofeyev) (29 July 1986 – 31 January 1991)
- abp. Theophanes (Galinskiy) (31 January 1991 – 11 September 2017)
- abp. Anthony (Sevryuk) (11 September – 28 December 2017)
- abp. Tikhon (Zaitsev) (since 28 December 2017)

== Notable churches ==
- Cathedral of the Resurrection, Berlin
- Alexander Nevsky Memorial Church, Potsdam
- St. Simeon of the Wonderful Mountain Church, Dresden
- Russian Memorial Church of Saint Alexius (Leipzig)
- Russian Orthodox Chapel, Weimar
- Church of Saint John of Kronstadt (Hamburg)
- Berlin-Tegel Russian Orthodox Cemetery

== See also ==
- Diocese of Berlin and Germany (Russian Orthodox Church Outside Russia)
- Eastern Orthodoxy in Germany
- Orthodox Churches in Berlin
- Assembly of Canonical Orthodox Bishops of Germany
