= Eastern Orthodox Church in Germany =

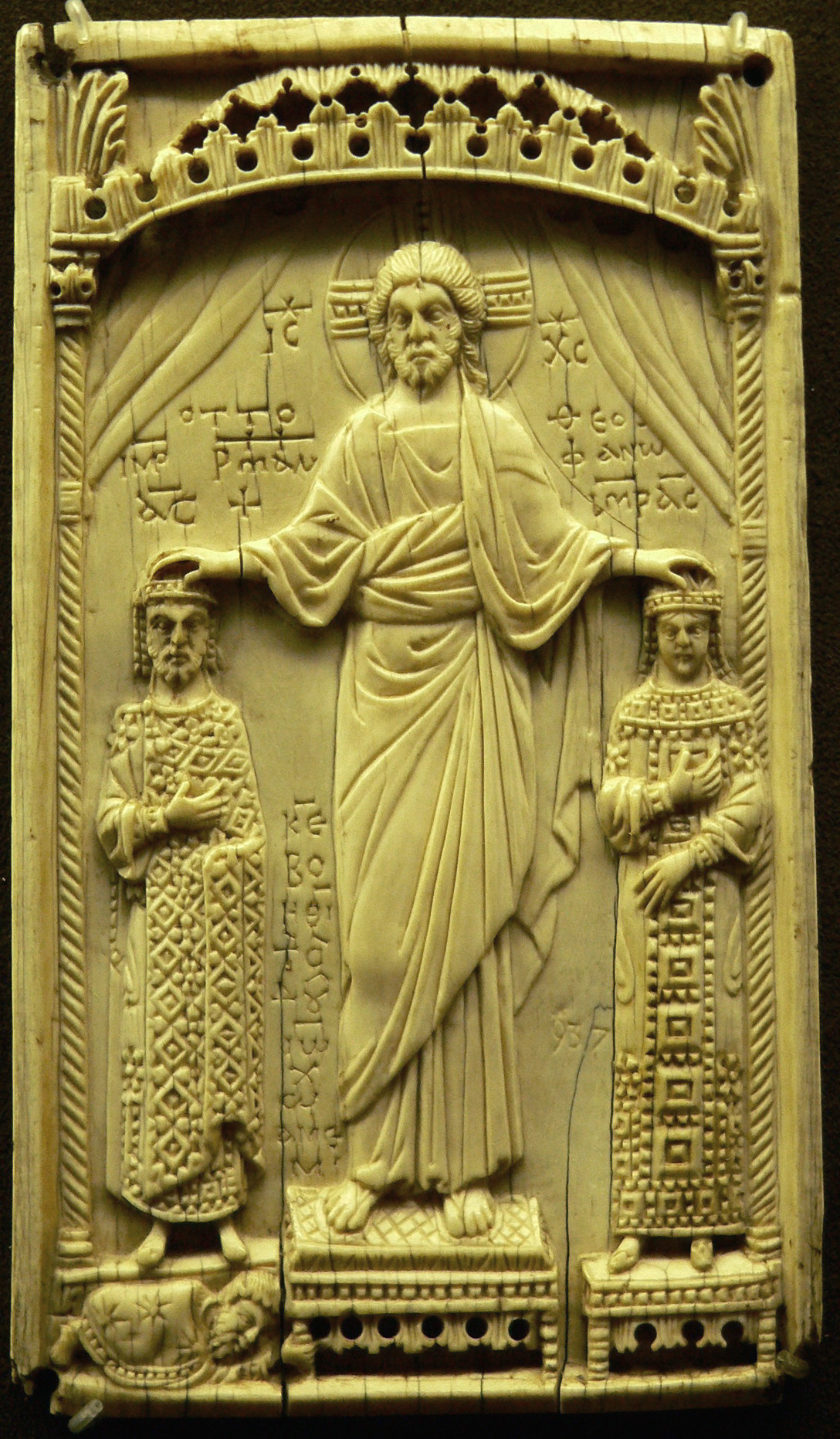
Byzantine ivory relief representing coronation of German Emperor Otto II and his wife, Empress Theophano, a Byzantine Princess

The Eastern Orthodox Church has an estimated 2 million adherents in Germany, and the Church is Germany's third-largest Christian denomination after Roman Catholicism and the Evangelical Church in Germany (EKD). It has grown due to immigration from Eastern Europe, especially Romania, Greece, the former Soviet Union, and the former Yugoslavia.

According to the 2011 census, 2% of the population identified as Orthodox, although this encompasses a number of different churches.

== Eastern Orthodox jurisdictions in Germany ==
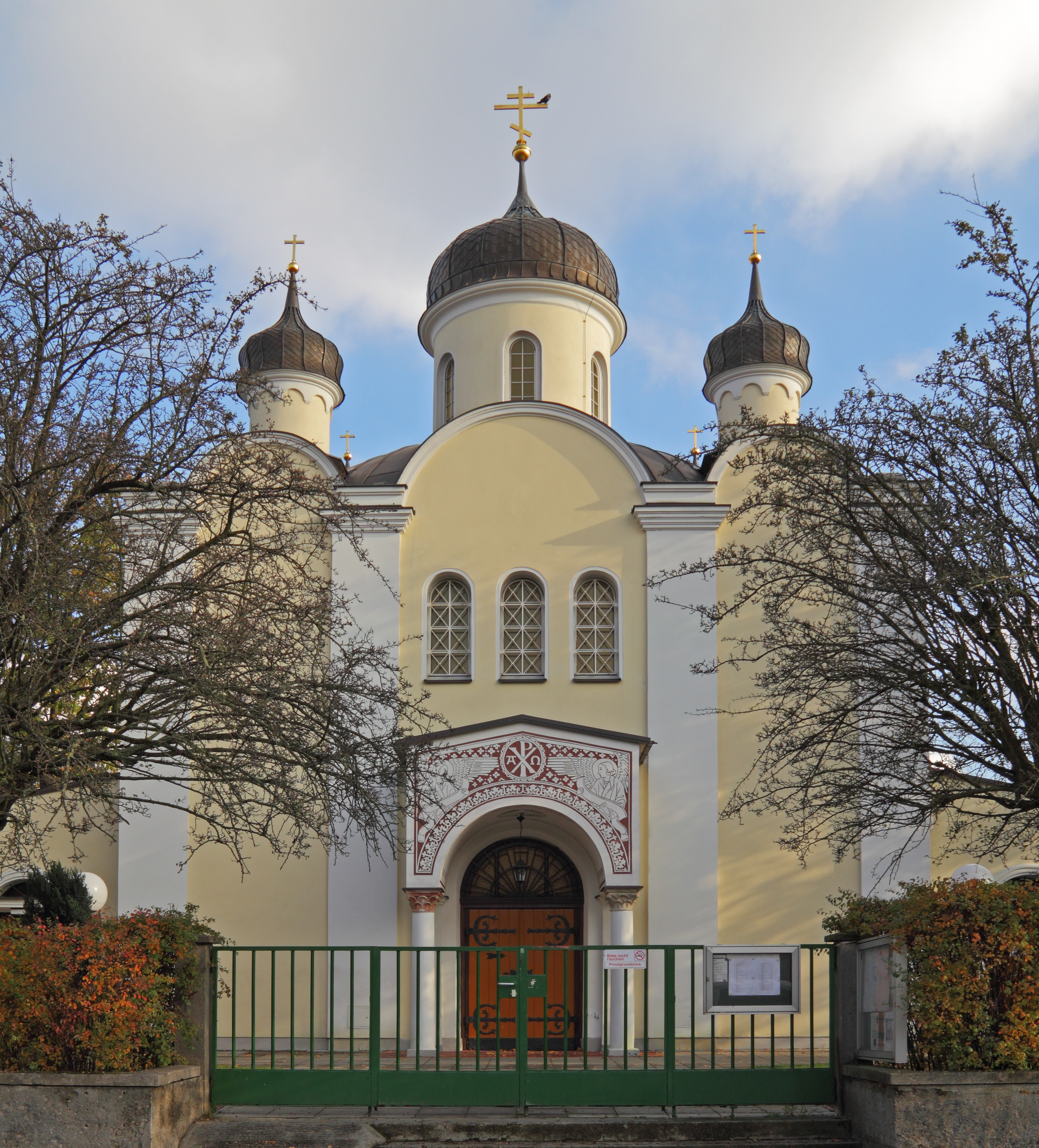
Russian Orthodox church in Berlin-Wilmersdorf

- Ecumenical Patriarchate of Constantinople
  - Metropolitan of Germany
- Patriarchate of Antioch
  - Archdiocese of Western and Central Europe
- Patriarchate of Moscow
  - Diocese of Berlin and Germany
  - Diocese of Berlin and Germany (ROCOR)
- Serbian Orthodox Church
  - Serbian Orthodox Eparchy of Düsseldorf and Germany
- Romanian Orthodox Church
  - Metropolis of Germany and Central Europe
- Bulgarian Orthodox Church
  - Bulgarian Orthodox Eparchy of Central and Western Europe
- Georgian Orthodox Church
  - Georgian Orthodox Diocese of Western Europe
- Macedonian Orthodox Church
  - Macedonian Orthodox Diocese of Europe
- Orthodox Church of Ukraine
  - Ukrainian Autocephalous Orthodox Church in Diaspora
  - Ecumenical Patriarchate of Constantinople

== Educational facilities ==
Institute of Orthodox Theology was founded in 1995 at LMU Munich.

== Ecumenism ==
Some Orthodox churches have been working since 1974 in the Council of Christian Churches in Germany (ACK). The five Orthodox churches have represented for several years in a joint delegation. Likewise, The Orthodox churches are involved in most regional and local working group of the ACK.

There are also bilateral relation with the German Bishops' Conference and the Evangelical Church in Germany (EKD) with discussions on theological issues. For example, several documents were adopted in 2006 to dogmatic questions in a joint working group of the Greek Orthodox Metropolis of Germany and the German Bishops' Conference. As of 2007, this working group has been redesigned and extended.

== German Orthodox Church ==
For ecclesiological and historical reasons, there is no "German Orthodox Church." In 1990, the German Orthodox Holy Trinity Monastery in Bodenwerder founded the first German Orthodox monastery which, although being ecclesiastically independent, was under the spiritual protection of the Bulgarian Orthodox Church.

== Interdenominational organization ==
- The Eastern Orthodox Episcopal Conference of Germany (Orthodoxe Bischofskonferenz in Deutschland), established in February 2010, includes 10 diocesan bishops and 7 vicar bishops. It covers about 1.5 million Eastern Orthodox Christians living in Germany. The President of the Conference, in accordance with the order of the Diptychs, the representative of the Ecumenical Patriarchate of Constantinople, is the Metropolitan of Germany Augustinos (Labardakis).
- Orthodoxe Fraternität in Deutschland
- Orthodoxer Jugendbund Deutschland, youth federation

== See also ==
- Religion in Germany
- Catholic Church in Germany
- Protestantism in Germany

== Sources ==
- (in German) Athanasios Basdekis: Die Orthodoxe Kirche. 2003, ISBN 3-87476-402-8
- Kiminas, Demetrius (2009). The Ecumenical Patriarchate: A History of Its Metropolitanates with Annotated Hierarch Catalogs. Wildside Press LLC. ISBN 9781434458766.
