= German prisoner-of-war camps in World War I =

Map of POW camps in Germany during World War I

During World War I, German prisoner-of-war camps were run by the 25 Army Corps Districts into which Germany was divided. Around 2.4 million men were World War I prisoners of war in Germany.

== Types of camp ==
Kriegsgefangenenlager (KGFL, "Prisoner of war camps") were divided into:

- Mannschaftslager ("Enlisted Men's Camp") for private soldiers and NCOs.
- Offizierslager ("Officer Camp") for commissioned officers.
- Internierungslager ("Internment Camp") for civilian enemy aliens.
- Lazarett, military hospital for POWs.

== List of camps by Army Corps districts ==
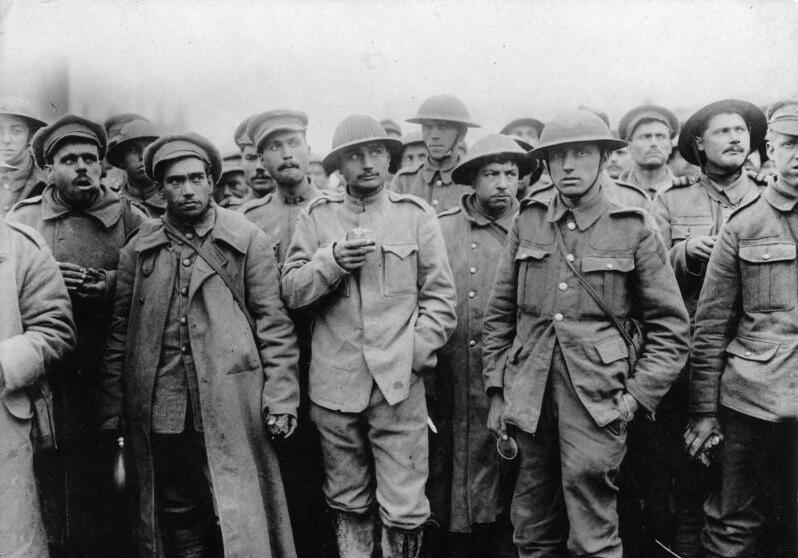
British, French and Portuguese prisoners, c.1918

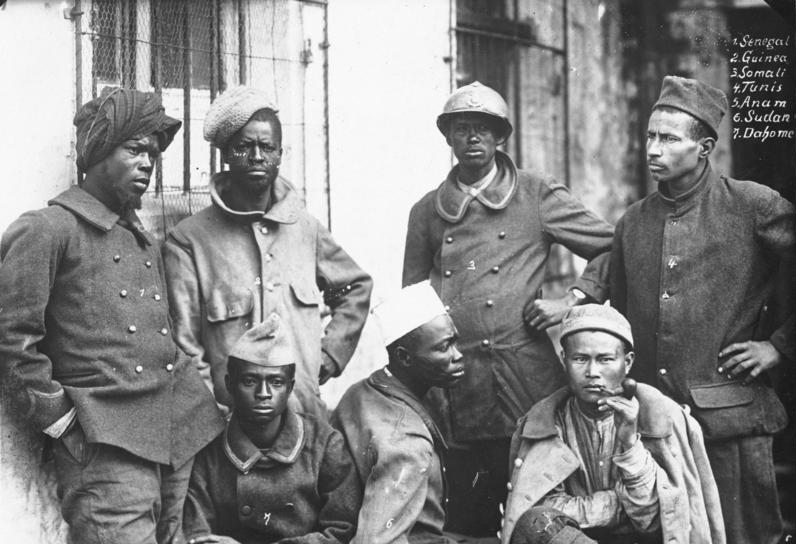
French colonial prisoners from North and West Africa

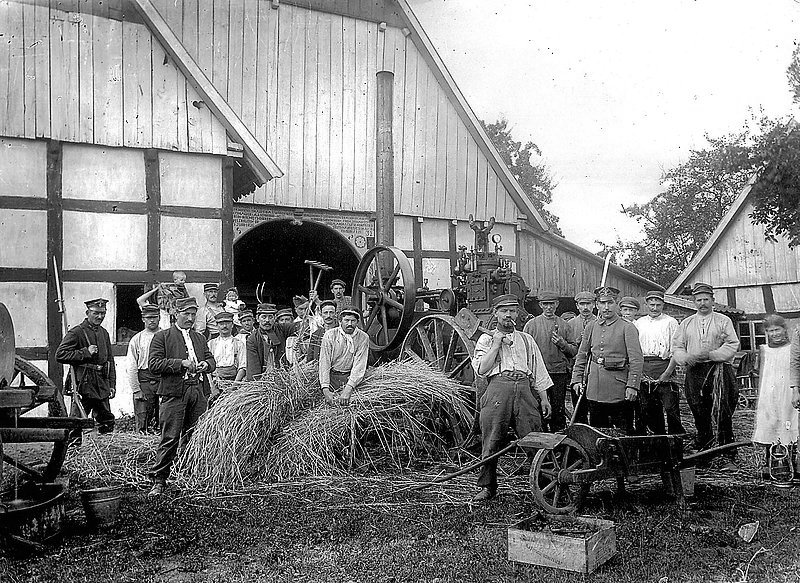
French POWs at work at a farm in Westscheid bei Mennighüffen

=== Guards Corps (Berlin) ===
Mannschaftslager

- Döberitz. A large camp 13 kilometres (8 mi) from Berlin holding Russian, Polish, French, and British prisoners, including men of the Royal Naval Division captured at the Siege of Antwerp.
- Dyrotz near Wustermark.

Lazarett

- Berlin. Located on Alexandrinenstrasse.

=== I Army Corps (Königsberg) ===
None found.

=== II Army Corps (Stettin) ===
Mannschaftslager

- Altdamm. Three camps holding 15,000 men.
- Schneidemühl. Located 5 km (3 mi) from the town this was a centre for work camps in the region, holding 40,000–80,000 men.
- Stargard.
- Stettin.
- Stralsund.

Lazarett

- Thorn.

=== III Army Corps (Berlin) ===
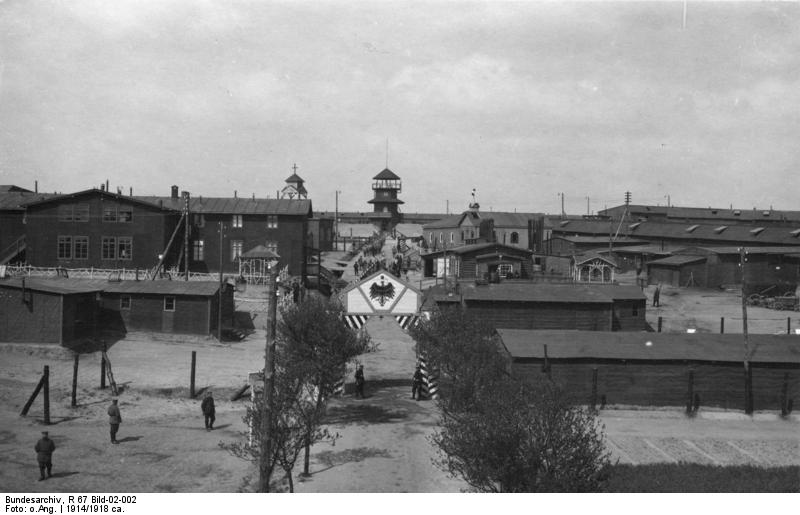
Kriegsgefangenenlager Crossen, 1914

Mannschaftslager

- Brandenburg an der Havel. Camp for Naval and Merchant Marine personnel.
- Cottbus. A sub-camp of Merzdorf.
- Crossen an der Oder.
- Frankfurt an der Oder. 6 km (4 mi) from the town, holding 18,000 men.
- Guben. from the town.
- Merzdorf.
- Müncheberg.
- Spandau. Camp for POWs working at a chemical factory.
- Zossen. A camp 30 km (20 mi) south of Berlin for British and French troops from India and Africa. The POWs were subjected to propaganda urging them to revolt against their "colonial masters" with little result

Internierungslager

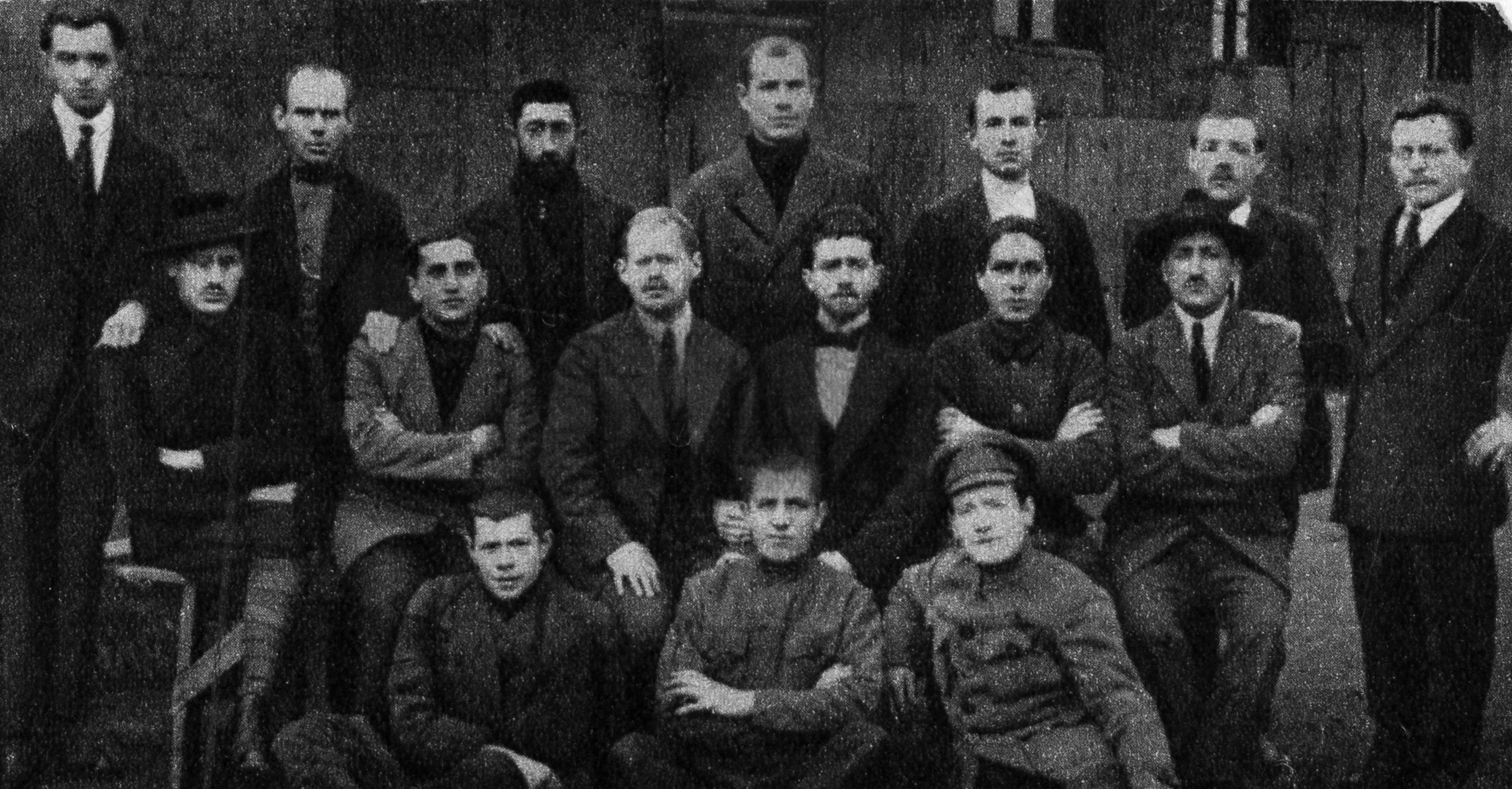
Bund leaders from Białystok and Dvinsk in Havelberg detention camp, 1918

- Havelberg. For 4,500 internees of various nationalities, including nearly 400 British Indians

=== IV Army Corps (Magdeburg) ===
Offizierlager

- Burg bei Magdeburg. Camp for 900 prisoners.
- Halle. Camp in a disused factory.
- Magdeburg. Camp on an island in the river.
- Torgau. Two camps in Bruckenkopf Barracks and in Fort Zinna.

Mannschaftslager

- Gardelegen. Camp opened in September 1914.
- Grabow. Formerly a military camp, consisting of eight compounds of six barracks each.
- Merseburg An assembly camp holding up to 25,000 prisoners, from which men were drafted to work camps.
- Quedlinburg. A camp 4 km (2 1/2 mi) from the town, holding 12,000 men.
- Wittenberg. A camp 4.2 hectares (10 1/2 acres) in area at Klein Wittenberg, 3 km (2 mi) from the city. Eight compounds held 13,000 men.
- Zerbst. A camp at an infantry drill ground 3 km (2 mi) north of the city. It held up to 15,000 men, but there were 100,000 registered there, the majority engaged in industry and agriculture.

Internierungslager

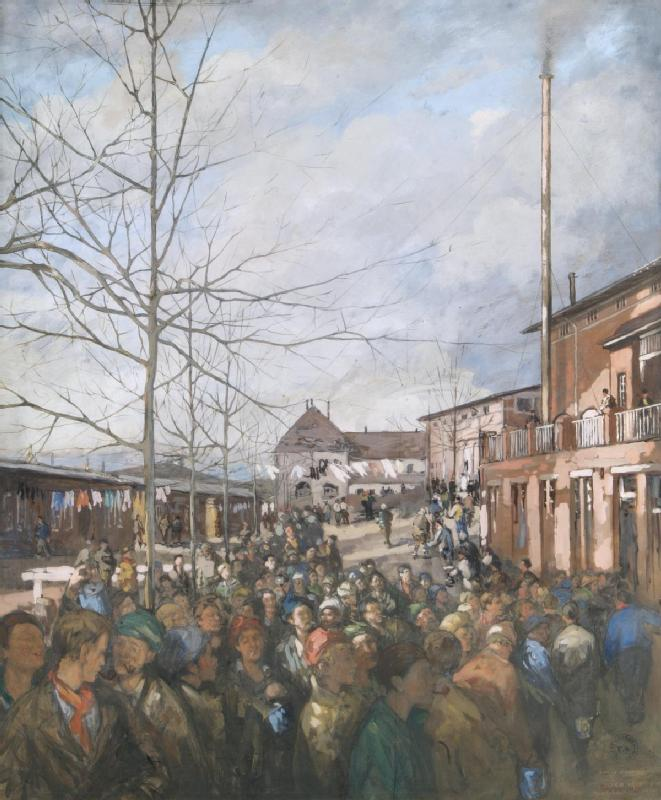
Ruhleben internment camp: detainees queuing for Christmas dinner: painting by Nico Jungman

- Ruhleben. Camp for up to 4,500 internees 10 km (6 mi) from Berlin located at a racecourse.

=== V Army Corps (Posen) ===
Mannschaftslager

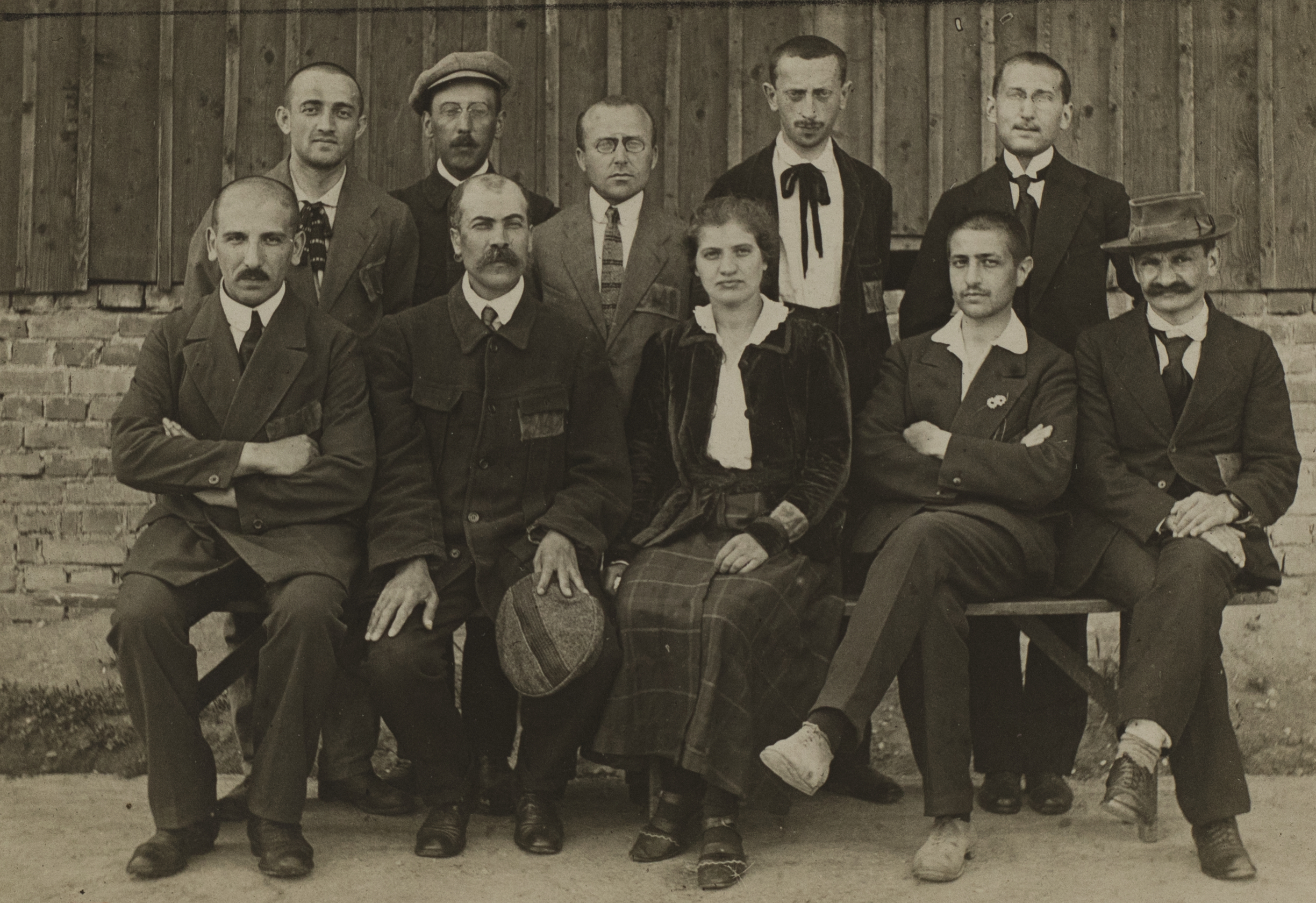
Bund leaders from Warsaw in Lauban detention camp, 1917

- Lauban.
- Sagan. A camp 8 km (5 mi) from the town holding 6,000 men.
- Skalmierschütz. A very large camp for Russians and Romanians to which British and American prisoners were sent in early 1918.
- Sprottau A camp 5 km (3 mi) from the town, and also a Lazarett for prisoners with tuberculosis.
- Stralkowo. A camp 5 km (3 mi) from the town holding mainly Russians and Romanians, and British from March 1918.

=== VI Army Corps (Breslau) ===
Offizierlager

- Gnadenfrei. Situated in a former boys school.
- Neisse. Located in former military academy in the centre of the town.
- Schweidnitz.

Mannschaftslager

- Lamsdorf. A camp at a military training ground that was reopened during World War II as Stalag VIII-B.
- Neuhammer. A clearing camp for Upper Silesia. 100,000 men were registered there, but were mostly in work camps under its administration.

Lazarett

- Beuthen. Two large Lazaretts, containing British prisoners from early 1918.

=== VII Army Corps (Münster) ===
Offizierlager

- Gütersloh. Originally a sanatorium.
- Werl. Located in a Franciscan monastery.
- Wesel

Mannschaftslager

- Burg Steinfurt. A camp for British prisoners.
- Dortmund.
- Duisburg.
- Dülmen.
- Düsseldorf.
- Erfurt. Held 15,000 men.
- Friedrichsfeld. Camp holding 35,000 men.
- Hammerstein. A camp for Russian prisoners.
- Heilsberg
- Minden. A camp 5 km (3 mi) from the town with 18,000 men.
- Münster. There were four camps: Münster I was outside the city in open farming country, Münster II was at the racecourse (Rennbahn), Münster III was a former Army barracks, and Münster IV was reserved for Russian prisoners.
- Sennelager. Three camps just north of Paderborn, named Senne I, II & III.
- Stendal. The camp lay 2 km (1 mi) north-east of the town, and was the parent camp for a number of work camps, holding 15,000 men.
- Tuchel. A camp for Russians and Romanians, also holding British and American prisoners from 1918.

Lazarett

- Paderborn.

=== VIII Army Corps (Coblenz) ===
Offizierlager

- Crefeld. There was also a Lazarett there.

Mannschaftslager

- Limburg an der Lahn. A camp holding 12,000 men in which Irish prisoners were concentrated for the purpose of recruiting for the Irish Brigade.
- Meschede. The camp, just outside the town, held 10,000 POWs.
- Wahn. Located 30 km (20 mi) south-east of Cologne at the Wahner Heide Artillery practice camp. The camp had 35,000 men on its register, and was a parent camp for work camps in the district.

Lazarett

- Aachen. Nine hospitals for British POWs awaiting repatriation.
- Coblenz.
- Cologne. Several hospitals. British prisoners were treated either in the Garrison Lazarett I or the Kaiserin Augusta Schule Lazarett VI.
- Trier. Officer prisoners were treated in the Reserve Lazarett IV (Horn Kaserne).

=== IX Army Corps (Altona) ===
Offizierlager

- Augustabad, Neubrandenburg. A former hotel holding British officers. Conrad O'Brien-ffrench was held there.
- Fürstenberg.

Mannschaftslager

- Güstrow. Situated in pine-woods 5 km (3 mi) from the town. It held 25,000 men, with a further 25,000 assigned to work camps registered there.
- Lübeck. A camp for men employed at the docks. Also a reserve Lazarett.
- Neumünster
- Parchim. A camp built on a former cavalry drill ground 5 km (3 mi) from the town. It held 25,000 men, with up to 45,000 more assigned to work camps registered there.

Lazarett

- Bremen. A garrison hospital and also a work camp attached to Soltau.
- Hamburg Reserve Lazarett VII was a ward of the central prison at Fuhlsbüttel. Reserve Lazarett III was at the Eppendorfer Krankenhaus, and at Veddel there was a Lazarett for Navy personnel.

=== X Army Corps (Hannover) ===
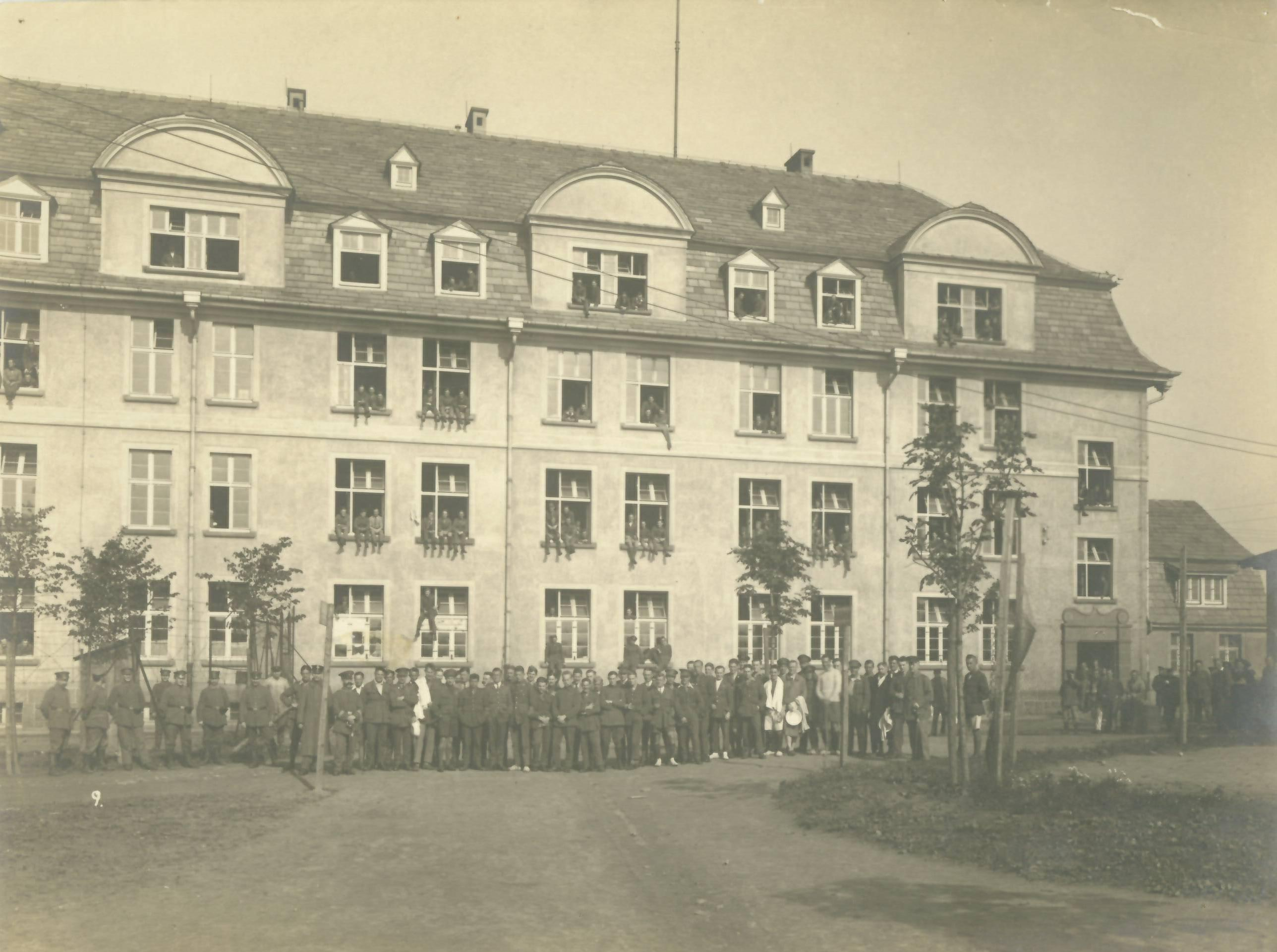
Holzminden officers' camp

Offizierlager

- Bad Blenhorst near Nienburg
- Celle. At Scheuen, and until late 1916 also Reserve Lazarett I (St Joseph).
- Clausthal.
- Hesepe nr. Osnabrück.
- Holzminden. For 500–600 British officers (plus approximately 100–160 other ranks orderlies). Housed in a former cavalry barracks (built 1913). The site of a noted tunnel escape in July 1918.
- Osnabrück. Camp located in a former artillery barracks.
- Ströhen.
- Schwarmstedt.
- Wahmbeck. At a hotel holding mostly officers from the merchant service.

Mannschaftslager

- Göttingen.
- Hameln. Located 2 km (1 mi) from Hameln, and the parent camp of many work camps.
- Munster. Camp opened in 1914 near Soltau on Lüneburg Heath
- Salzwedel.
- Soltau. The camp held 35,000 men, but had 50,000 assigned to work camps registered there.

Lazarett

- Hanover. Lazarett V was in the Royal War School, and there was another at the Garrison Lazarett.

Internierungslager

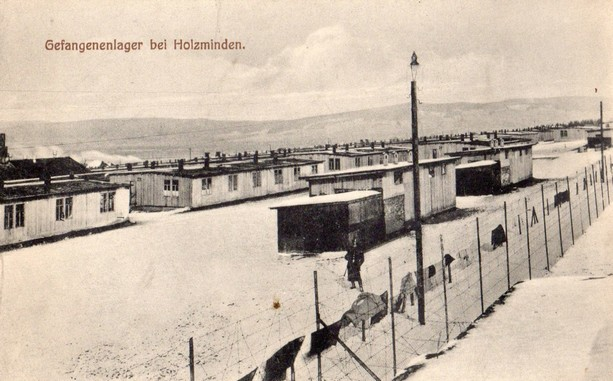
Holzminden internment camp

- Celle Castle. For civilians and ex-officers.
- Holzminden. For approximately 4,000–5,000 civilian internees, mainly Polish, Russian, French and Belgian, and including a small number of Britons. Comprised two camps, one for men, the other for women and children.

=== XI Army Corps (Cassel) ===
Offizierlager

- Bad Colberg. Camp housed in a former sanatorium.

Mannschaftslager

- Langensalza. Opened in 1914, the camp held 10,000 men.
- Ohrdruf. Located on a former Army training ground and held 15,000 men.

=== XII Army Corps (Dresden) ===
Offizierlager

- Bischofswerda.
- Königstein. French and Russians held in the Fortress.

Mannschaftslager

- Bautzen
- Königsbrück. Held 15,000 men.

=== XIII Army Corps (Stuttgart) ===
Mannschaftslager

- Heilbronn Sub-camp of Stuttgart.
- Stuttgart. Two camps; one in the city in an abandoned factory building, the other in a disused factory 5 km (3 mi) outside.
- Ludwigsburg.

Lazarett

- Kempten. British prisoners quartered in the hospital there.

=== XIV Army Corps (Karlsruhe) ===
Offizierlager

- Karlsruhe. Two camps; one in the grounds of the Karlsruher Schloss contained naval and, later, aviation officers, the other, the former Europäischer Hof, was known as "The Listening Hotel", and was an interrogation centre.
- Freiburg. Located in an old university building.
- Heidelberg. In barracks 6 km (4 mi) from town.
- Ingolstadt. The camps were located in the city fortifications; fortresses 8, 9 & 10. As a camp for persistent escapers, it was the World War I counterpart to Colditz. Documented in the book The Escaping Club by Alfred John Evans.
- Villingen. The camp was in a disused barracks.
- Weingarten near Karlsruhe.

Mannschaftslager

- Ingolstadt. Situated on the edge of the town, holding 4,000 men.
- Mannheim Located 3 km (2 mi) outside of the city. From February 1917 it used as a clearing or exchange camp for British prisoners of war awaiting repatriation. Held 10,000 men.

Internierungslager

- Rastatt Camp for French civilians. During 1918 it was used as a military transit camp.

=== XV Army Corps (Strasbourg) ===
Offizierlager

- Strasbourg

=== XVI Army Corps (Metz) ===
- Metz. Known as Lazarett Saint-Clément.

=== XVII Army Corps (Danzig) ===
Mannschaftslager

- Czersk. A camp for Russian POWs, to which British prisoners were also later sent.
- Danzig (Troyl) The "camp" consists of barges moored on the bank of the Vistula River, each containing from 100 to 500 men. The administration block, kitchen, and other facilities of the camp are on shore. Men from the failed Irish Brigade were sent here.

=== XVIII Army Corps (Frankfurt-am-Main) ===
Offizierlager

- Bingen am Rhein
- Friedberg
- Griesheim nr. Frankfurt
- Mainz. The camp was in the grounds of the Mainz Citadel, and held 700 POWs.
- Rosenberg. Located in Festung Rosenberg above the town of Kronach. Charles de Gaulle was held as a POW there.
- Weilburg. POWs were held in a three-storied school-house.

Mannschaftslager

- Darmstadt Located 6 km (4 mi) from the town on a cavalry exercise ground.
- Giessen
- Görlitz. Held 14,000 POWs.

Lazarett

- Jülich
- Kreuznach. For up to around 600 prisoner-patients.

=== XIX Army Corps (Leipzig) ===
Offizierlager

- Döbeln

Mannschaftslager

- Chemnitz. The camp was located in the Friedrich-August Kaserne.
- Zwickau. The camp held 10,000 POWs.

=== XX Army Corps (Allenstein) ===
Mannschaftslager

- Arys
- Osterode Located at a locomotive works. A sub-camp of Preußisch Holland.
- Preußisch Holland. The camp held 15,000 POWs, with up to 35,000 assigned to various work camps registered there.

=== XXI Army Corps (Saarbrücken) ===
Offizierlager

- Neunkirchen. Located in a former monastery.
- Saarbrücken. In a former school.
- Saarlouis
- Zweibrücken. British officers were first sent there in 1916.

=== I Royal Bavarian Army Corps (Munich) ===
Mannschaftslager

- Landsberg am Lech
- Lechfeld. Held 10,500 POWs.
- Puchheim. Located on a military airfield 13 km (8 mi) from Munich. Held 12,000 POWs.

Lazarett

- Munich. The large war school in the Mars Platz is used as a hospital, and there is another known as Lazarett B.

=== II Royal Bavarian Army Corps (Würzburg) ===
Offizierlager

- Würzburg. Located in Festung Marienberg.

Mannschaftslager

- Hammelburg
- Germersheim. Held 6,000 men.
- Würzburg. Outside the town on a high hill.

=== III Royal Bavarian Army Corps (Nürnberg) ===
Mannschaftslager

- Amberg. Held 5,000 POWs.
- Bayreuth. Held 5,000 POWs.
- Landau
- Nuremberg. Located 5 km (3 mi) from the town on an old training ground of the Nuremberg Garrison.

Lazarett

- Erlangen. For officers only.

=== Others ===
Offizierlager

- Eutin
- Graudenz
- Lahr. British from 1917.
- Landshut
- Ludwigshafen. From 1917.
- Münden. Camp for up to 600 officers located in a former factory 2 km (1 mi) from the town.
- Osnabrück
- Pforzheim. From early 1918.
- Strasbourg

Mannschaftslager

- Cassel (Niederzwehren). Held 20,000 POWs.
- Constance. All officers and men for internment in Switzerland are concentrated here. Held 15,000.
- Deutsch Gabel Camp for merchant seamen under Austrian administration.
- Grafenwöhr Camp and Lazarett (Bavarian Corps)
- Gleiwitz. Located in a cavalry barracks. British prisoners sent there after March 1918.
- Heustadt. A centre for work camps in East Prussia.
- Heuberg. Located at the training area Lager Heuberg.
- Kalisch. Camp for Russian and Romanian soldiers, and also British from April 1918.
- Kattowitz Camp for Russian and Romanian soldiers, and also British from April 1918.
- Marienburg A centre for work camps in East Prussia.
- Neuburg am Inn
- Ulm. Camp on the outskirts of the town, of the usual barrack type.
- Zittau Russian POWs.

Lazarett

- Frankfurt am Main. Several hospitals for British prisoners; Reserve Lazarett II and H65 are the principal ones.
- Ingolstadt. Two hospitals in the town.
- Ratisbon

== Fictional prison camps ==
- Hallbach and Wintersborn – in La Grande Illusion, film (1937)
- Stalag Luft 112B – in Ripping Yarns TV episode "Escape from Stalag Luft 112B" (1977)
- Dusterstadt – in The Young Indiana Jones Chronicles / The Adventures of Young Indiana Jones film episode "Chapter 8: Trenches of Hell" (1993)

== See also ==
- German camps in occupied Poland during World War II
- Lists of World War II prisoner-of-war camps
- World War I prisoners of war in Germany
