= Tikhon Zaitsev =

Russian Orthodox Archbishop of Berlin and Germany

- Archbishop of Ruza
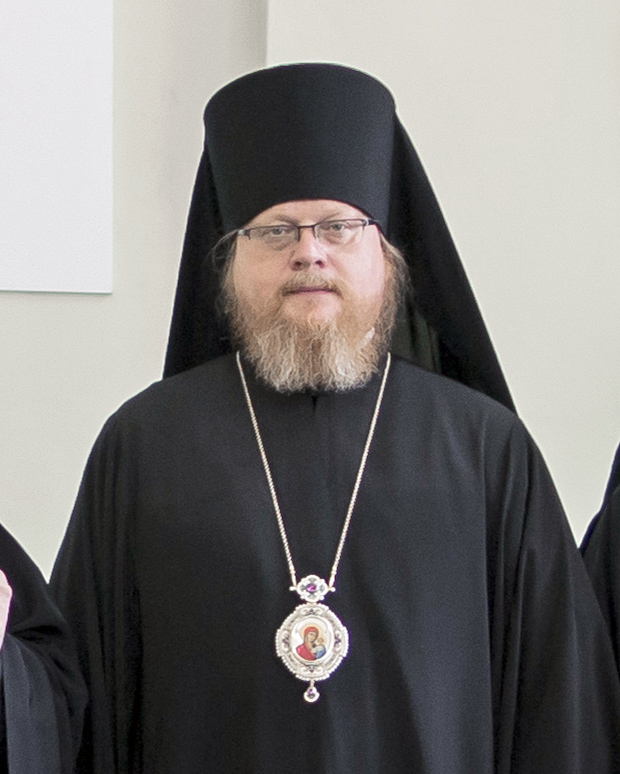
- Archbishop Tikhon in Moscow in 2015
- Native name: Тихон
- Church: Russian Orthodox Church
- Diocese: Berlin and Germany
- Appointed: 28 December 2017
- Predecessor: John (Roshchin)
- Successor: Incumbent

Orders
- Ordination: 7 April 1993 (deacon); 25 March 1993 (Tonsured); 26 April 2009 (Bishop); 1 February 2018 (archbishop) by Metropolitan Kirill (Gundyaev) of Smolensk and Kaliningrad
- Rank: Archbishop

Personal details
- Born: Alexander Viktorovich Zaitsev; April 13, 1967 (age 59) Moscow, Soviet Union
- Denomination: Eastern Orthodox Church

Archbishop Tikhon (Russian: Архиепископ Тихон, secular name Alexander Viktorovich Zaitsev, Russian: Александр Викторович Зайцев; born 13 April 1967), is the bishop of the Russian Orthodox Church; currently he is ruling hierarch of the Diocese of Berlin and Germany with the title of "Archbishop of Ruza".

== Early life ==
Alexander Zaitsev was born in Moscow in 1967. After graduating from high school, he then attended vocational school and graduated in 1985. From 1985 to 1987, he served in the Soviet Army.

== Religious life ==
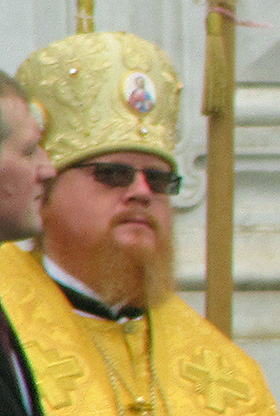
Tikhon (Zaitsev) at a ceremony at the Cathedral of Christ the Savior in 2012

After completing his military services, Zaitsev entered the Moscow Seminary, which he successfully completed in 1991. In the same year he was admitted to the Moscow Theological Academy, which he graduated in 1995, defending his inaugural dissertation on the dignity of the candidate of theology in the department "The Venerable Theodore Studites - teacher of the monastic order". After completing his studies at the Academy, Tikhon continued his work as a teacher in the Moscow seminary, where he taught liturgy, homiletics and Ancient Greek.

On 25 March 1993 he was consecrated a priest by Patriarch Alexy II, and was shortly after tonsured a monastic monk by the Archimandrite Benedict (Knyazev), the first Prorector of the Moscow Spiritual Academy and the Seminary. He took the name Tikhon in honor of St. Tikhon, the previous Patriarch of all Russia.

On 6 January 1996, he was ordained a hieromonk by Eugene (Reshetnikov). On Easter in 1996 Tikhon was awarded a pectoral cross by Patriarch Alexy II. On Easter in 1999, he was elevated to the rank of hegumen.

On 24 December 2004 by the decision of the Holy Synod he was appointed a member of the Russian Spiritual Mission in Jerusalem, and on 6 October 2006 he was appointed head of the mission.

On 8 October 2006 at the Assumption Cathedral of the Trinity Lavra of St. Sergius, Tikhon was elevated to the rank of Archimandrite by Patriarch Alexy II.

=== As Bishop ===
On 31 March 2009, by decision of the Holy Synod, Tikhon was elected titular bishop of Podolsk, vicar to the Patriarch of Moscow and Russia. He was also appointed chairman of the revived Financial and Economic Department of the Moscow Patriarchate with the dismissal of the head of the Russian Theological Mission in Jerusalem.

On 14 April 2009 of the same year, he was appointed rector of the Church of St. Nicholas in Khamovniki. On 25 April Tikhon was appointed bishop in the Cross Church of All Saints for the Patriarchal and Synodal Residences of the Danilov Monastery in the Russian land.

On April 26 of the same year, at the liturgy in the Cathedral of Christ the Savior, the episcopal consecration of Tikhon was performed. The ordination was performed by: Patriarch of Moscow and All Russia Kirill, Metropolitan of Washington and New York Jonah (Paffhausen), Archbishop Hilarion (Alfeyev), Archbishop of Ottawa and Canada Seraphim (Storheim), Archbishop Eugene (Reshetnikov) of Vereya, Archbishop Alexy (Frolov) of Orekhovo-Zuyevo, Archbishop Theognost (Guzikov) of Sergiyev Posad, Archbishop Anthony (Pakanich) of Boryspil, Bishop Sabbas (Volkov) of Krasnogorsk, Bishop Alexander (Agrikov) of Bryansk and Sevsk, Bishop Ambrose (Ermakov) of Gatchina, Bishop Ignatius (Punin) of Bronnitsy, Bishop Elisey (Ganaba) of Sourozh, Bishop Sergius (Chashin) of Solnechnogorsk. He became the first bishop to be put on the patriarchate of Patriarch Kirill.

On 27 July 2009, by a decision of the Holy Synod, he was included in the Inter-Council Assembly of the Russian Orthodox Church.

On 22 March 2011, he was ex officiator included in the newly formed Higher Church Council of the Russian Orthodox Church.

From 2011 to 2015 Tikhon has been the head of the North-Eastern Vicariate (encompass the area of the North-Eastern Administrative Okrug), officially appointed as the Head of the Vicariate and is included in the Diocesan Council of Moscow only on 31 December of the same year.

On 22 October 2015 Tikhon was appointed bishop of the Vienna-Austrian and Hungarian dioceses. He visited Austria for the first time on 5 November and Hungary on 9 November of that year. On 10 November he met with the Deputy Prime Minister of the Hungary Zsolt Semjén, as well as with the Catholic Cardinal of Hungary Péter Erdő.

On 28 December 2017, he was relieved from the administration of the Vienna-Austrian and Hungarian dioceses and was succeeded by Anthony (Sevryuk), while Tikhon was appointed bishop of the Berlin-German diocese with the title “of Podolsk” retained, due to the fact that the title of bishop of Berlin and German is already held by Archbishop Mark (Arndt).

On 9 January 2018, as part of being appointed bishop of Germany, Tikhon was relieved of the administration of the North-Eastern Vicariate of the city of Moscow and the post of rector of the Church of St. Nicholas the Wonderworker in Khamovniki.

On 1 February 2018 in the Cathedral of Christ the Saviour in Moscow, Tikhon was elevated to the rank of archbishop by Patriarch Kirill of Moscow.

On April 13, 2021, by the decision of the Holy Synod of the Russian Orthodox Church, in connection with the formation of the Diocese of Podolsk, his title was changed to "of Ruza".

Eastern Orthodox Church titles
Preceded by Anthony (Sevryuk) (locum tenens)	ruling hierarch of the Diocese of Berlin and Germany; 28 December 2017 —	Succeeded by Incumbent
Preceded by Mark (Golovkov)	Bishop of Vienna; Vienna and Austria; 22 October 2015 — 28 December 2017	Succeeded by Anthony (Sevryuk)
Preceded by Dionysius (Porubay)	Locum tenens of the Kasimov diocese 14 July 2018 — 18 November 2018	Succeeded by Basil (Danilov)
