= Stimme der Orthodoxie =

Russian Orthodox magazine

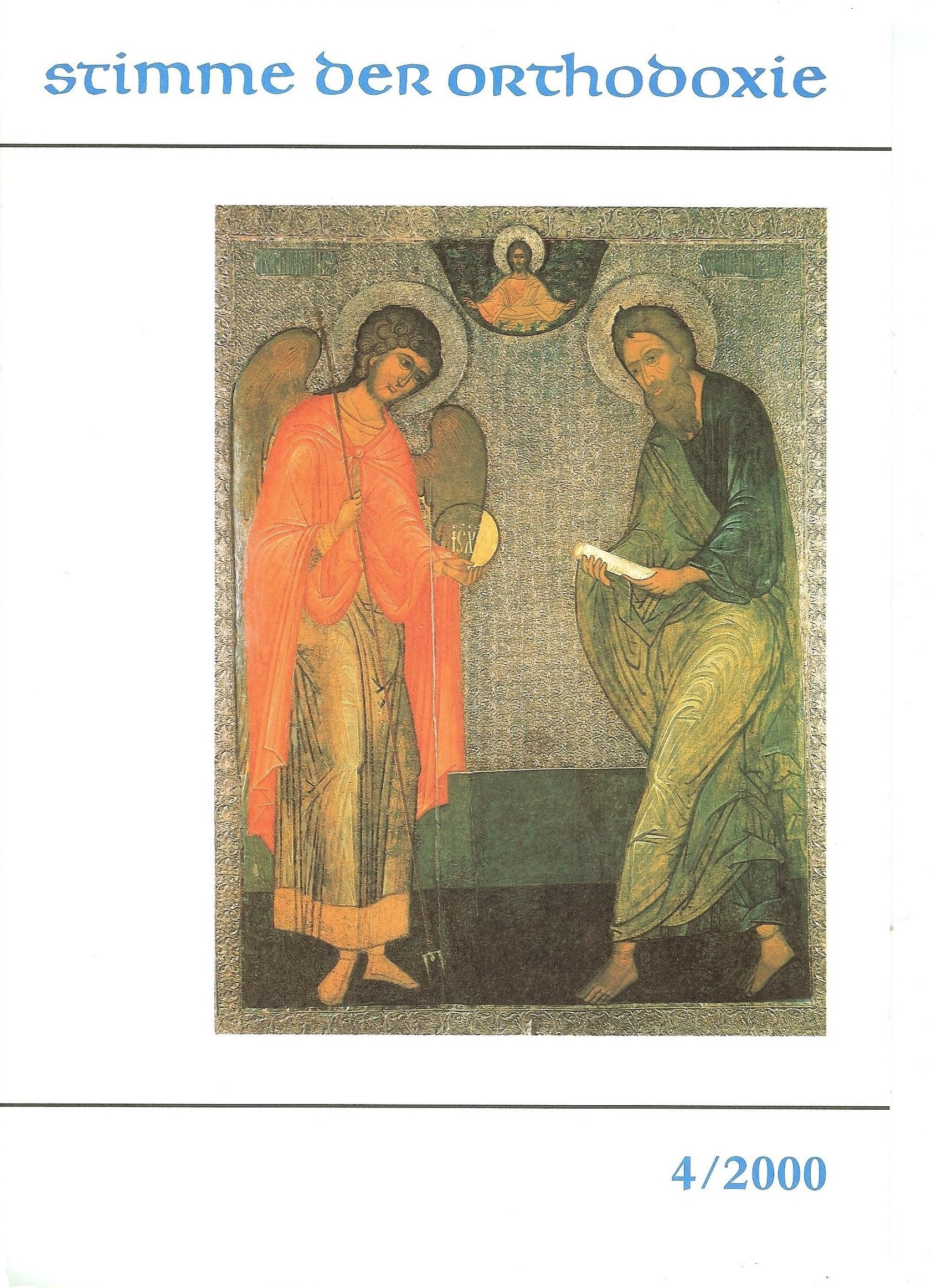
Stimme der Orthodoxie, front page

Stimme der Orthodoxie (Russian: Голос Православия, romanized: Golos Pravoslaviya, lit. 'Voice of Orthodoxy') was a Russian Orthodox magazine, published in Berlin by the Diocese of Berlin and Germany of the Moscow Patriarchate. In the years 1952–1954 it was published in the Russian language, then in German from 1961 till ceasing publication in 2004.

== History ==
Founded in 1952 as the Russian-language magazine Голос Православия, the journal issued monthly, with its first number issue being published in January that year. At first it was edited collectively (editorial secretary in 1952–1953 was Alexander Shishkin).

The order of the material was basically the same as in the "Journal of the Moscow Patriarchate". Each issue begins with the official part. In the official part of the printed messages and treatment of Patriarch Alexius I of Moscow and Archbishop Boris (Wik) of Berlin, as well as orders, award lists and other documents on the Western Europe Exarchate, information about the episcopal church services, inter-Orthodox and ecumenical contacts, news of various local Churches, mainly from Albania, Poland and Czechoslovakia.

The journal mostly copied articles from other Russian Orthodox magazines, both pre-revolutionary and contemporary such as the "Journal of the Moscow Patriarchate", "One Church", etc. Some issues had rubrics, containing original materials of local church history, e.g. "From the Life of the Orthodox parishes of the Diocese of Germany", "Church Chronicle", "The Church Life". For each issue there were attached pages of the church calendar. In 1954 the publication of the Russian-language magazine ceased.

In May 1961 the magazine was revived under the title Stimme der Orthodoxie already as an organ of Middle Europe Exarchate of the Russian Orthodox Church in order to "acquaint readers with some moments in the life of the Russian Orthodox Church, and in the first place - with the church life of the Orthodox parishes in Germany, as well as the life and work of the Exarchate". At the same time the task was "to strengthen contacts with all Christian churches and religious organizations".

A significant part of the publications of both the official section containing documents of Church-wide and local significance, and other sections (Theological, Church-historical, Preaching, "Theological schools", "From the life of the Central European Exarchate", "Christians and protection of the Peace", "Chronicle") was translated from the "Journal of the Moscow Patriarchate", "Bulletin of the Russian West European Patriarchal Exarchate" and other periodicals, including pre-revolutionary ones. Moreover translations from patristic works, ascetical works and sermons of revered Russian ascetics, theologians, including theologians of the 20th century and representatives of the Russian diaspora were published.

In 1987–1991 there was a "Russian column" (Русская рубрика), where the messages of the ruling bishop, poems and small edifying texts were printed in Russian.

Since March 1990, after the abolition of the Central European Exarchate, the journal was published by the Diocese of Berlin and Germany. After 1993 it was published quarterly. Two issues were released in 2004, being discontinued afterwards.

== Editors-in-chief ==
- Edited collectively (1952–1954)
- Mikhail Dobrynin (1961–1962)
- Hegumen Juvenal (Poyarkov) (1962–1963)
- German Troitsky (1963–1966)
- Konstantin Komarov (1966–1971)
- Archpriest Evgeny Misseyuk (1971)
- Priest Mikhail Turchin (1971–1976)
- Priest Vasily Fonchenkov (1976–1977)
- Archpriest Gennady Yablonsky (1977–1986)
- Archpriest Mikhail Turchin (1986–1987)
- Archpriest Vladimir Ivanov (1987–2004).

== Literature ==
- «Голос Православия» (орган православной Германской епархии Московской Патриархии) 1952 г., №№ 1, 2 и 3. // Журнал Московской Патриархии, 1952
- Stimme der Orthodoxie — Берлин: изд. Среднеевропейского экзархата МП, 1961. — № 1—3.
- Соболева Н. «Stimme der Orthodoxie» // за 1–е полугодие 1962. — Берлин: изд. Среднеевропейского экзархата МП, 1962.
- Соболева Н. «Stimme der Orthodoxie» — Берлин: изд. Среднеевропейского экзархата МП, 1963. — № 3. — С. 75—77.
- Сводный каталог русских зарубежных периодических и продолжающихся изданий в библиотеках С.-Петербурга. — СПб., 1996. — № 105.
- Сводный каталог периодических и продолжающихся изданий русского зарубежья в библиотеках Москвы. — М., 1999. — № 262.
- Прот. Александр Троицкий «ГОЛОС ПРАВОСЛАВИЯ» // Православная энциклопедия : энциклопедия. — 12 апреля 2011. — Т. 11. — С. 713—714.
