= Russian Memorial Church of Saint Alexius (Leipzig) =

Russian Orthodox church in Germany

Coordinates: 51°19′27″N 12°23′49″E

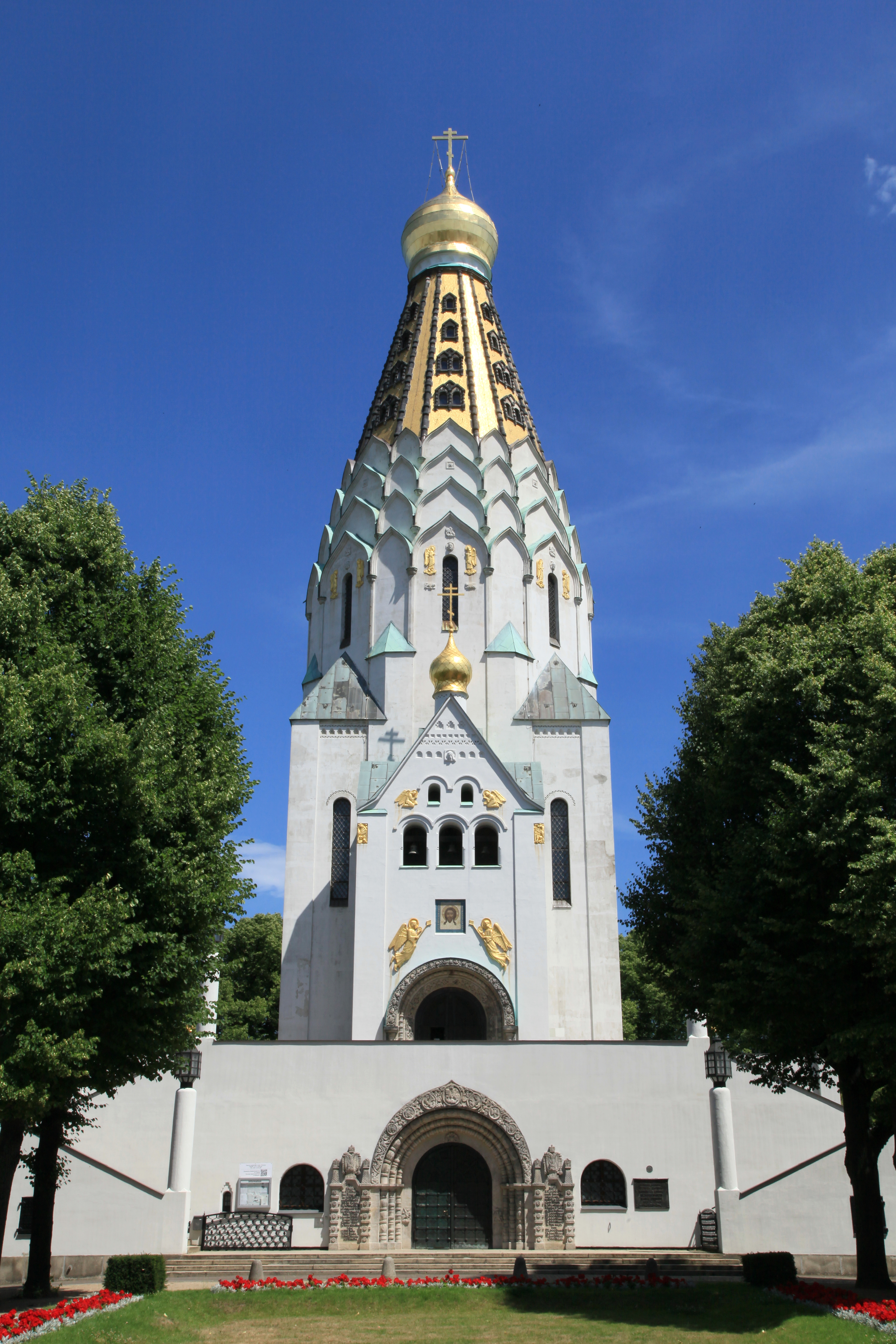
Front view of church exterior

The Russian Memorial Church of Saint Alexius is a Russian Orthodox church in Leipzig, Germany. It was inaugurated and dedicated from October 17–18, 1913, one hundred years after the Battle of Leipzig (also known as the Battle of the Nations). The memorial commemorates the 127,000 Russian troops who served in the Battle, including the 22,000 who died freeing the Germans. In 1813, the German-speaking Austrians and Prussians had been united with the Russians in their battle against Napoleon and the French. Less than a year after the dedication of this centenary memorial, a different set of alliances resulted in World War I.

The church was named after St. Alexius, a Metropolitan of Moscow from the 14th century. Many external and internal features make this church unique, including a wall of icons, a large chandelier, tablets bearing inscriptions on either side of the doors and four coffins containing the remains of soldiers who fought in the Battle of Leipzig. Its fortunes have varied, partly based on Leipzig's government. After Russians occupied Leipzig in World War II, they began to take care of the church and inserted a new plaque extending the purpose of the church to commemorate Russian soldiers down to 1945.

The church continues to serve as a place of worship for a congregation of about 300 with a weekly attendance of about 100. It is part of the Russian Orthodox Church. Both interior and exterior portions of the church have undergone necessary renovations in recent decades. Structural work began in 2012 in preparation for the building's centennial and restoration of the wall of icons was completed in 2018.

== Namesake ==
The church was named after Alexius of Moscow. Born around 1295, he served as Metropolitan of Moscow from 1354 to 1378. He is credited with miraculously healing the wife of the Golden Horde's khan of blindness. Though he obeyed the Golden Horde, who held the Russians in a tributary relationship, he discouraged Western intervention and strengthened ties between Moscow and outlying Russian lands, contributing to Russia's liberation from the Tatars soon after his death. He was commemorated as a saint from the 15th century.

== Battle of Leipzig ==
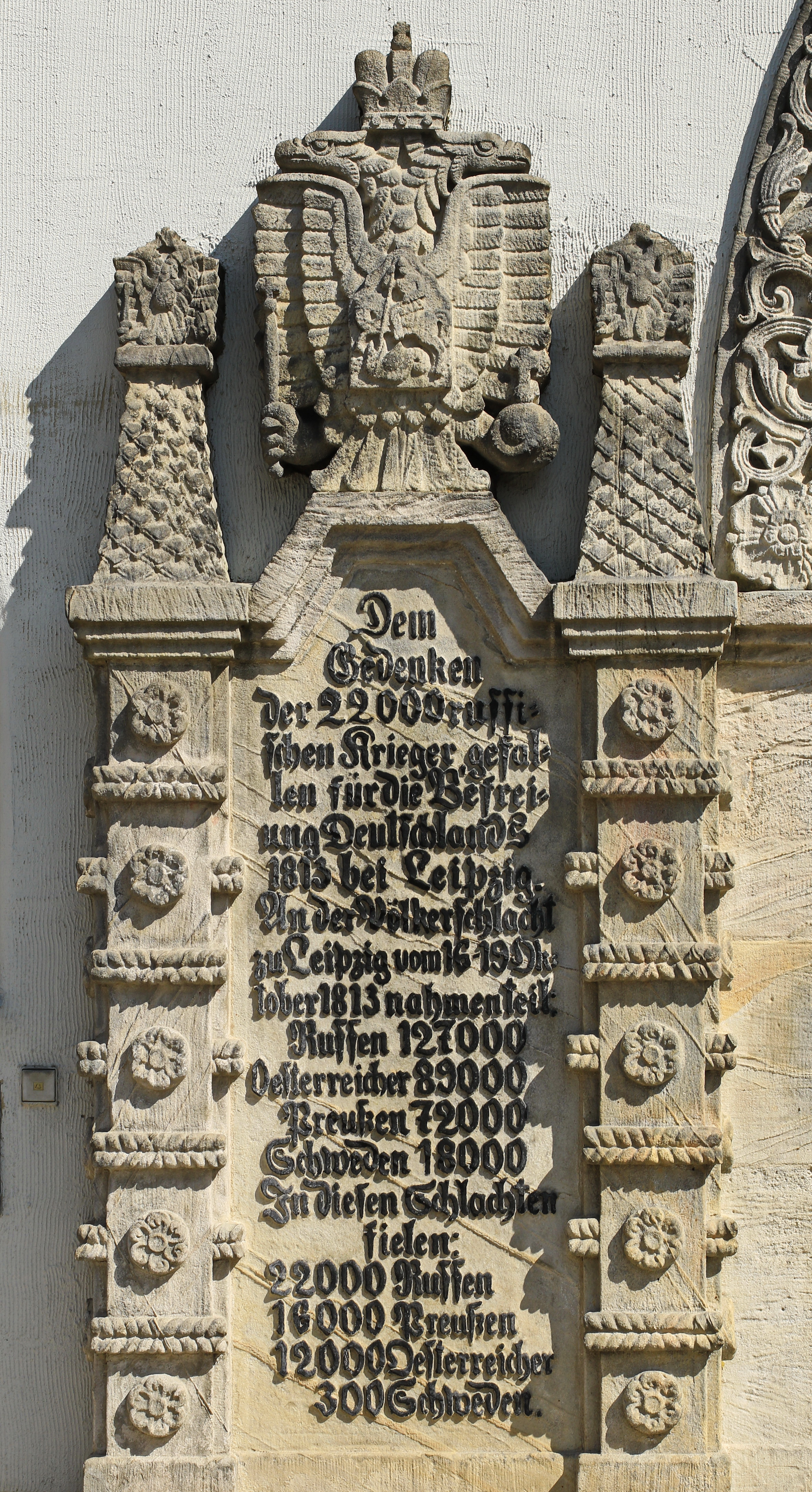
Dedication to Russian and allied soldiers at Leipzig

The Battle of Leipzig was part of the German Campaign in the War of the Sixth Coalition. On October 14, 1813, Napoleon reached Leipzig, in Saxony, a member of the Confederation of the Rhine ruled by Napoleon's puppet, King Frederick Augustus III. Represented in all four major anti-French armies in the battle, 127,000 Russians fought alongside 89,000 Austrians, 72,000 Prussians, and 18,000 Swedes. Even Tsar Alexander I was present, anxious for battle.

Initial fighting was inconclusive but reinforcements on October 17 left Napoleon outnumbered 300,000 to 170,000. Low on artillery, the French began their retreat at 2 am, October 19. As Napoleon's army fled coalition forces, a French colonel prematurely blew up the only bridge over the White Elster. While 38,000 of Napoleon's troops were killed or wounded at Leipzig (15,000 of these were captured), 15,000 more were captured in the bungled retreat. The battle ended French sovereignty east of the Rhine River. Leipzig suffered due to war debts and new international trade. About half of Saxony was annexed by Prussia. Frederick ruled the remainder, including Leipzig. Allied dead included 22,000 Russians, 16,000 Prussians, 12,000 Austrians and 300 Swedes.

== Construction ==
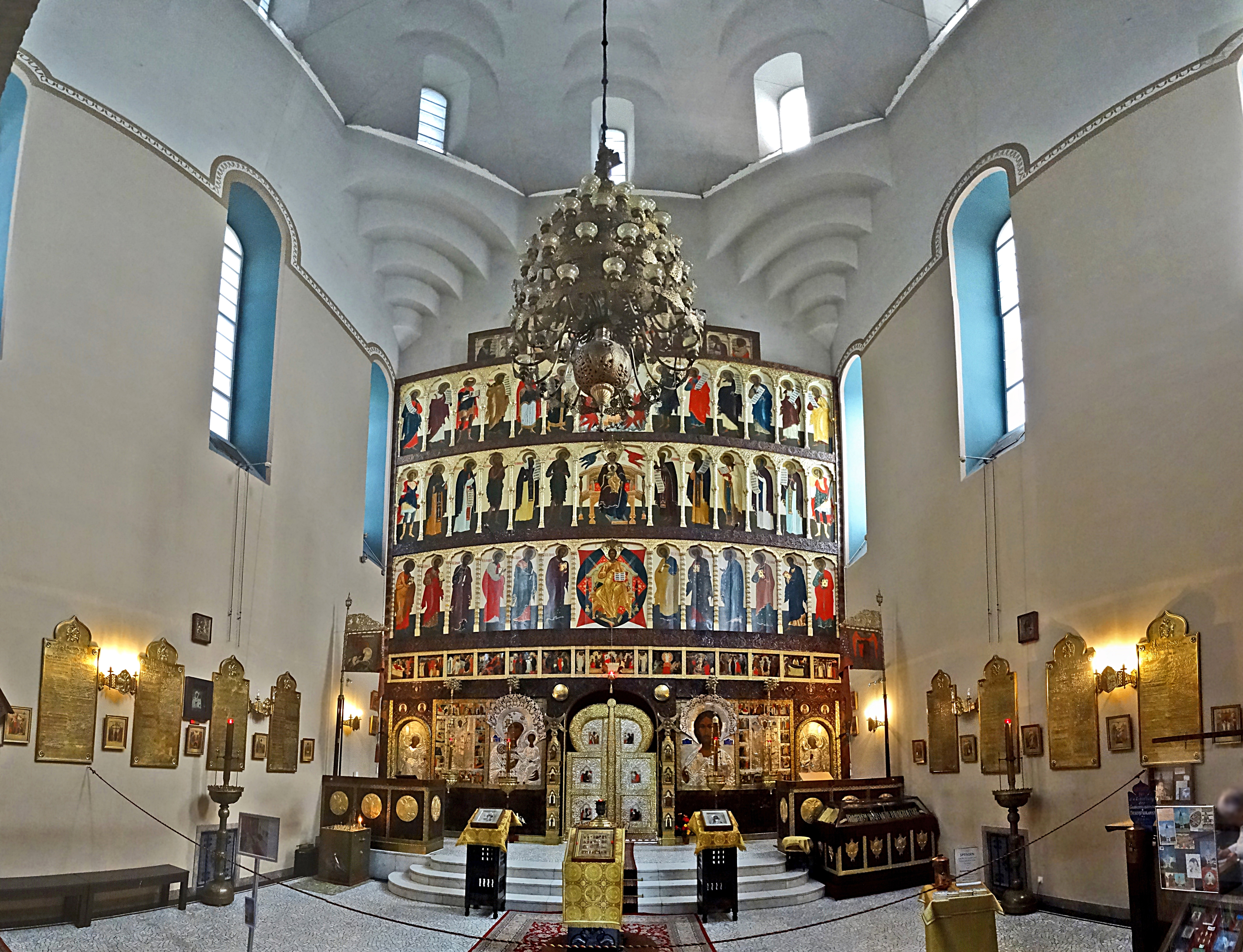
Interior view of the church

The church was built in the southeast of Leipzig, where the Battle had occurred. Russia paid for the church, which was built on land provided by Leipzig. While the church cost about one million marks, about half was raised through donations. A Russian architect, Vladimir Potrovsky, provided the plans for the building while German architects Weidenbach and Tschamer worked directly with the Russian and German builders. It ultimately took less than ten months from the laying of the foundation stone on December 28, 1912, before the church was ready to be dedicated on October 17, 1913.

Potrovsky designed the building with the Ascension Church in Kolomenskoye as a model. The Ascension Church had been built between 1530 and 1532, one of the first tent-roof churches to be made of stone rather than wood. The Ascension Church's design began with a square base which becomes eight and then sixteen-sided as it rises. Like the Ascension Church, Potrovsky's Russian Memorial Church tapers from a square to octagonal to a sixteen-sided shape. Unlike most Russian churches, the Russian Memorial Church has a single tower rather than a main tower and four smaller ones.

The church was built in the Novgorod style, 55 metres (180 ft) tall, capped with a golden onion-dome. The building was meant to be visible from far away and – in addition to promoting the memory of the Russian troops who died in battle – the church holds the remains of some of these soldiers within four coffins inside the church. Three coffins hold the soldiers Nicolas Kudaschev, Iwan Jegorowitsch Schewitsch, and Andrej Jurgenew, while the fourth contains remains from unknown Russian soldiers from the battle.

The church includes a wall of icons, typical of Eastern Orthodox churches. In this case, the wall includes 78 icons, pictures of saints and holy figures. The wall is 18 meters (59 ft) high and 10 meters (33 ft) wide. The icons were painted by Luka Martjanovich Jemelyanov, a painter from Moscow, and decorated with semi-precious stone, silver, and other metals. This set of icons was a gift from the Don Cossacks. Above the wall of icons hangs a chandelier weighing about 800 kilograms (1,800 lb) and holding 72 lamps. This chandelier was also a gift, this one from Tsar Nicholas II.

== 1913 context ==
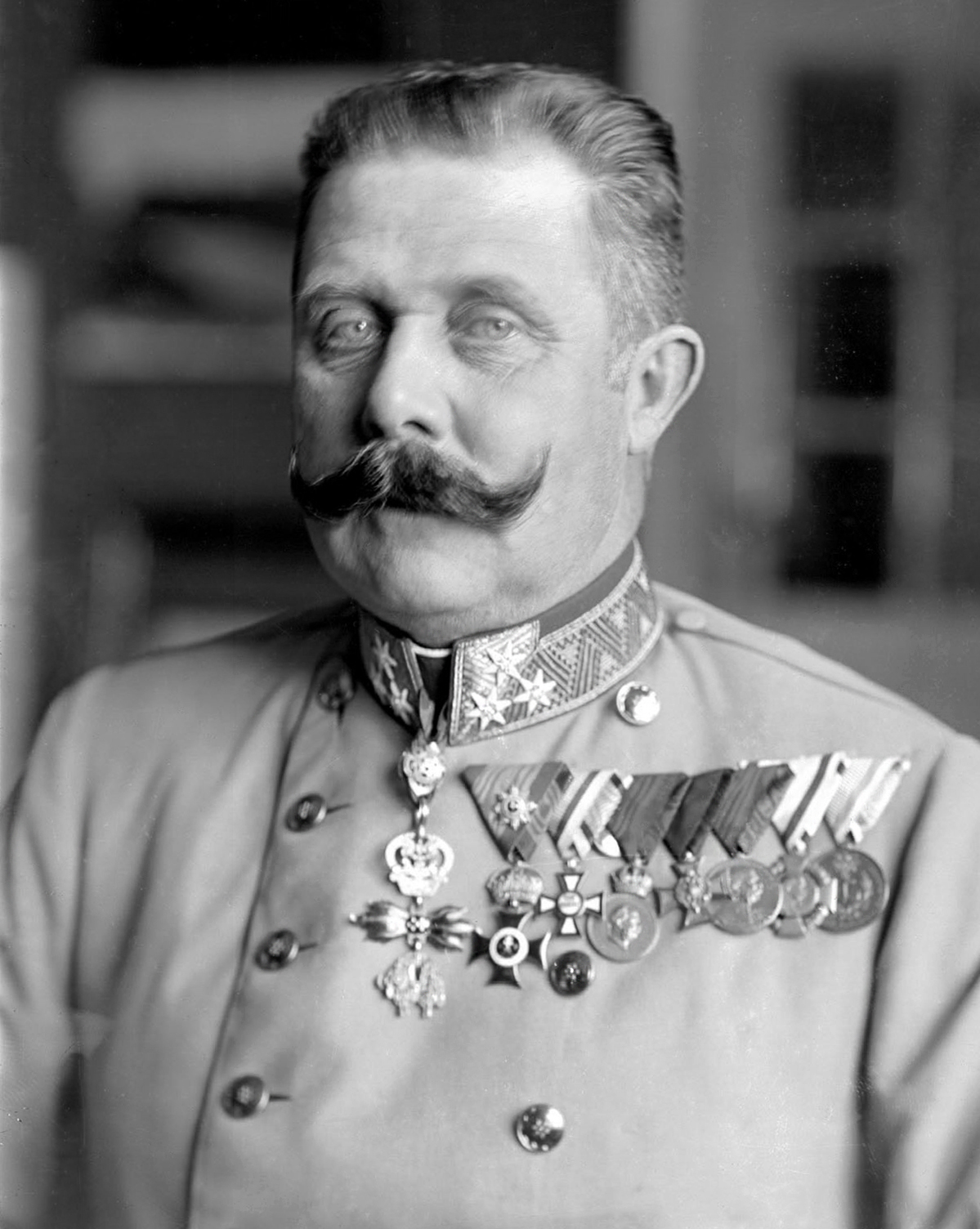
Archduke Franz Ferdinand, c. 1914

By 1913, Leipzig was part of a German Empire, which included Prussia after German unification. The church bears plaques honoring the soldiers who died "for the liberation of Germany". The church has been called a "reminder of peace for all people". Regardless of the church's symbolic meaning, Germany had acquired, by means including the Scramble for Africa, a large empire.

On October 18, 1913 two centennial monuments to the Battle were dedicated. About 100,000 people participated in the dedication of the Monument to the Battle of the Nations, which had taken 15 years to build, was 91 metres (299 ft) tall and used 300,000 tons of masonry.

The same day, Grand Duke Kirill Vladimirovich, representing Czar Nicholas II, attended the service dedicating the Russian Memorial Church. Kaiser Wilhelm II, King Frederick Augustus III of Saxony, and Archduke Franz Ferdinand also attended. The archduke was heir apparent to the Austrian throne and was assassinated less than a year later by Gavrilo Princip. The assassination caused Austria-Hungary to declare war on Serbia. Thus, Serbia's allies Russia, France, and Britain declared war on Austria-Hungary, which was backed by Germany and Italy.

== Under communist rule ==
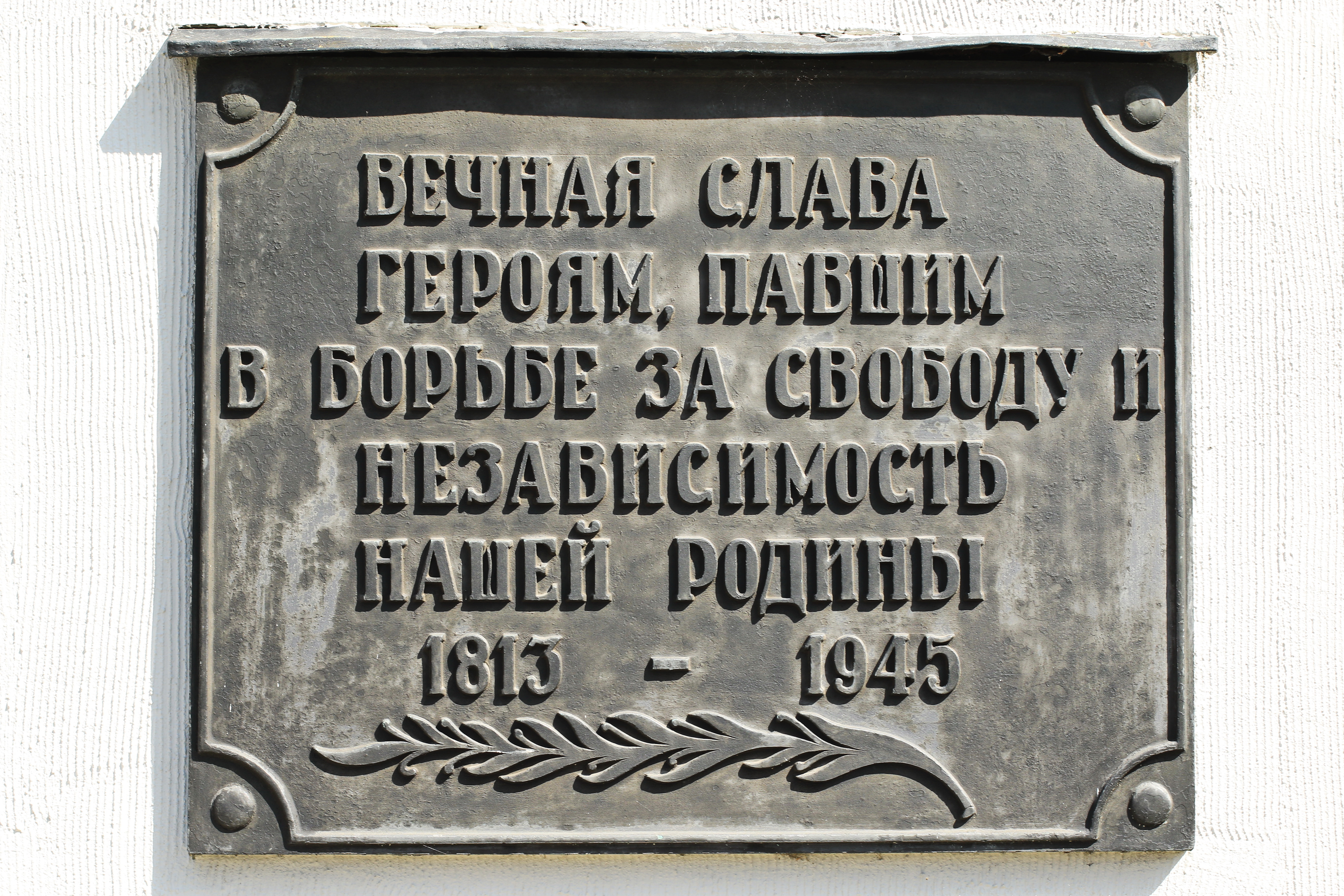
Plaque celebrating Russian soldiers 1813–1945

The church was renovated in 1923, though it remained in a poor condition and was considered for demolition in 1927. Damage caused by World War II was repaired by the occupying Soviets in 1945. This renovation was initiated by an order from the Soviet Marshal Georgy Zhukov to put the building in to exemplary shape after his visit. They also installed a plaque with an inscription, in Russian, that translates to: "Eternal glory to the heroes who died in the struggle for the freedom and independence of our homeland 1813–1945." Although the Soviet government had suppressed Christianity and persecuted its followers, it used the church to show Russian valor in both the Napoleonic Wars and the Second World War. Under the German Democratic Republic, it received further renovations in 1963, 1978, 1981, and 1989. The 1981 work was fairly significant, leaving the church fully restored.

== Modern use ==
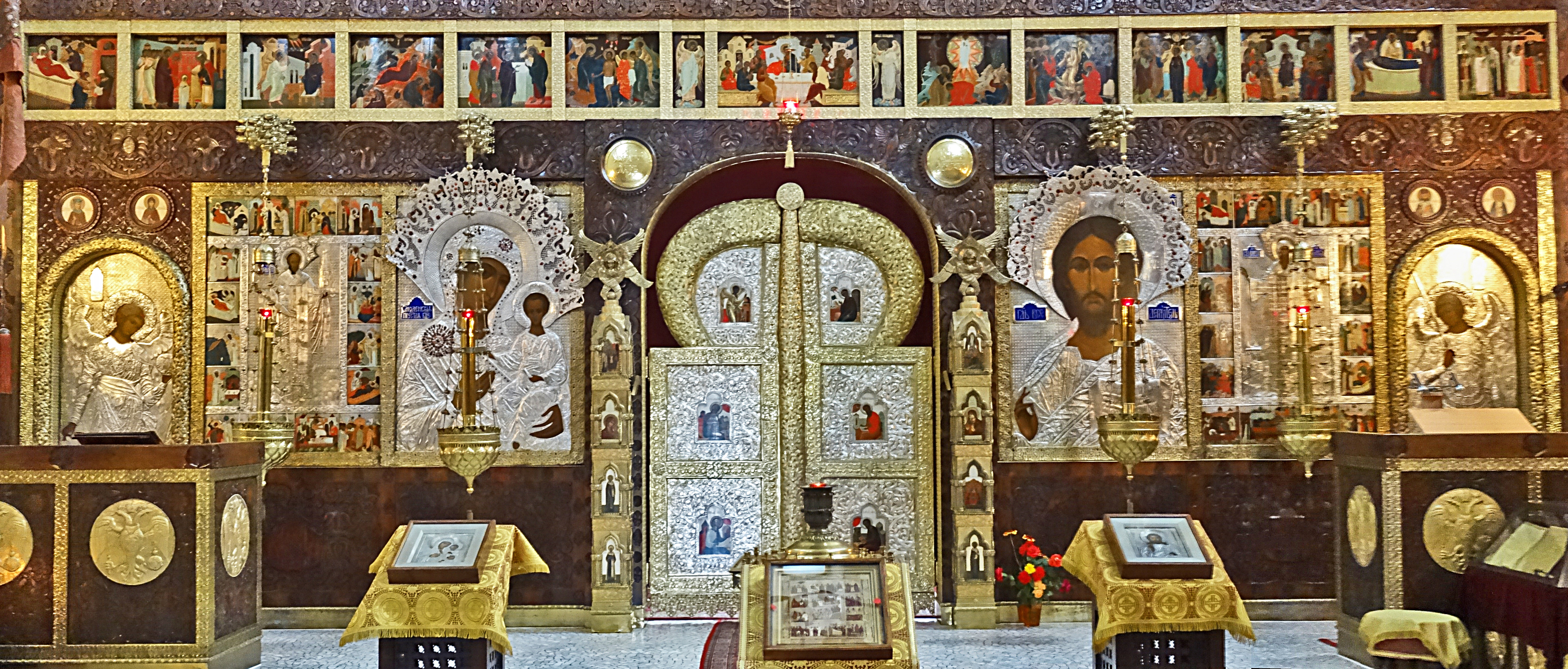
Detail of a portion of the wall of icons

Beginning in 2012, renovations with a price of about a million euros (equivalent to €1,256,068 in 2023) began in preparation for the building's one hundred year anniversary, though the renovations ultimately continued beyond 2013. The renovations included work on the gold-plated covering of the onion-dome, among other things. The governments of Germany, Leipzig and Saxony all contributed to the cost, as did the private German Foundation for Monument Protection. The city of Moscow contributed the most with 250,000 euros (equivalent to €314,017 in 2023).

The wall of 78 icons underwent a lengthy restoration process that ended in 2018. The wall of icons was restored at a cost of about 300,000 euros. Most of this came from the governments of Germany and Saxony, though some came from the congregation, individuals in Leipzig and Moscow, and an art preservation association. Today, Orthodox Christian worshipers with Russian, Ukrainian, Belorussian, Bulgarian, and German backgrounds attend services at 10 am on Sundays and holidays. Approximately 100 people attend worship each week, while the full membership of the church is about 300. The building is also open to tourists daily from 10 am to 5 pm (4 pm in the winter).
