= Greek Orthodox Metropolis of Germany =

Metropolis of the Greek Orthodox Church

Metropolis of Greek Orthodox Metropolis of Germany

Orthodox
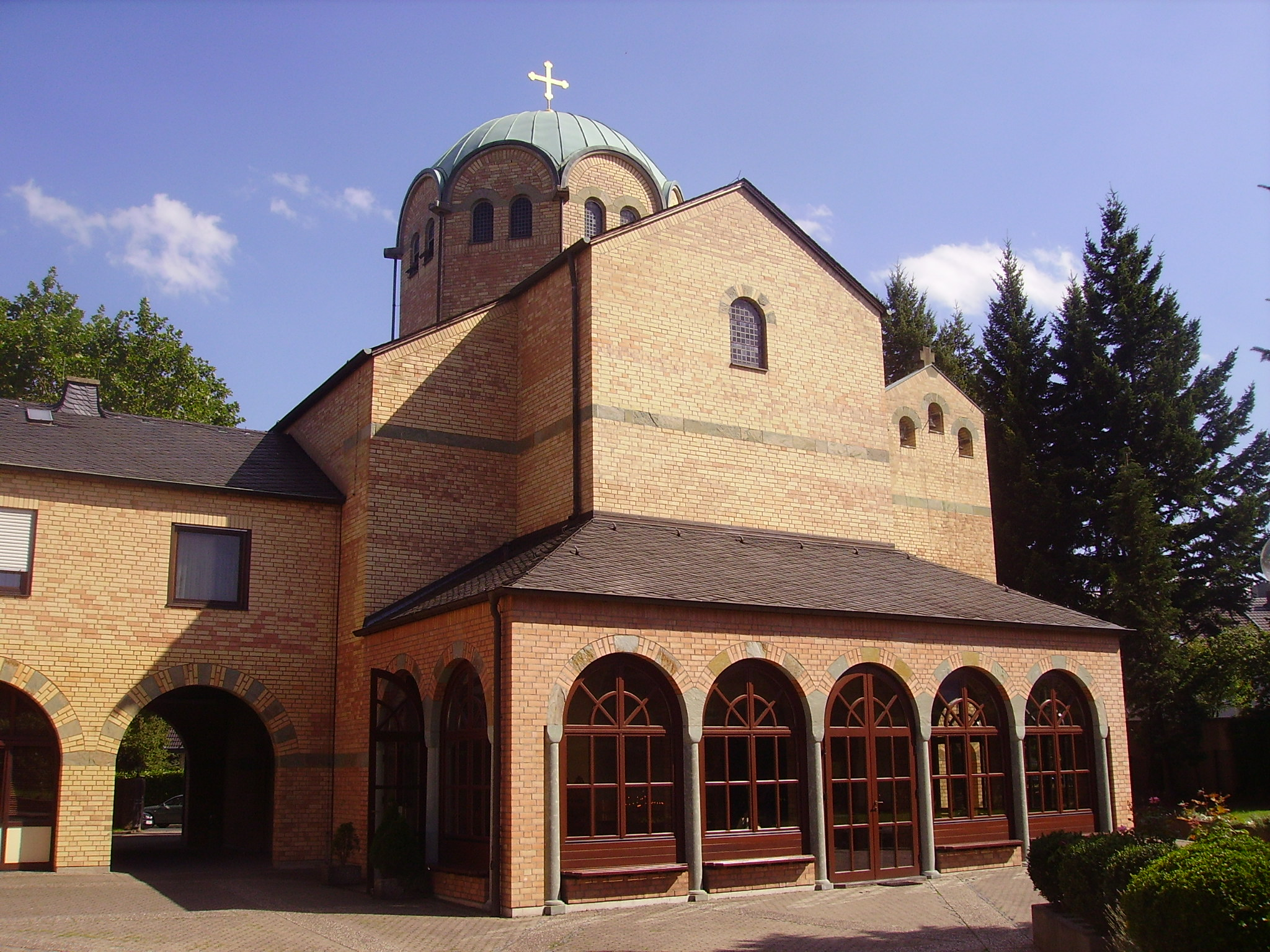

Location
- Territory: Germany

Statistics
- Parishes: 139

Information
- Denomination: Eastern Orthodox Church
- Rite: Byzantine Rite
- Language: Greek, German

Current leadership
- Parent church: Ecumenical Patriarchate of Constantinople
- Patriarch: Bartholomew I of Constantinople
- Metropolitan: Augoustinos (Lambardakis)

Website
- www.orthodoxie.net

The Metropolis of Germany is a metropolis of the Greek Orthodox Church. It is headed by Metropolitan Augoustinos of Germany since 1980. As of 2025 it serves 139 parishes.

== History ==
Greek parishes have existed in Germany since the 19th century. From the 1920s, due to the influx of labor migration, newly established Greek parishes were placed under the jurisdiction of the Metropolis of Thyateira, based in London.

On 5 February 1963, the Ecumenical Patriarchate of Constantinople established an independent Greek Orthodox Metropolis of Germany, covering Germany, the Netherlands and Denmark.

On 12 August 1969, Denmark was transferred to the newly established Metropolis of Sweden and all Scandinavia, and the Netherlands to the Metropolis of Belgium, while the Greek Orthodox Metropolis of Germany also received the title of Exarchate of Central Europe.

Since 1966, the Metropolis began contacts with the Conference of European Churches, and on 8 November 1978 it became a full member of this international organization.

The constitution of the Metropolis was adopted on 20 December 1972. In 1978, the Metropolitan Center and the Cathedral of the Holy Trinity in Bonn were completed.

== List of bishops ==
- Polyeuktos (Finninis) (22 October 1963 – 25 June 1968)
- Chrysostom (Tziter) (June 1968 – November 1969)
- Iakovos (Zanavaris) (12 August 1969 – 3 December 1971)
- Irenaeus (Galanakis) (16 December 1971 – 29 September 1980)
- Augustinos (Lambardakis) (since 29 September 1980)

== See also ==
- Greeks in Germany
- German-Greek relations
