= Camp Quedlinburg =

POW camp built in 1914 in Germany

Coordinates: 51.807825°N 11.189008°E

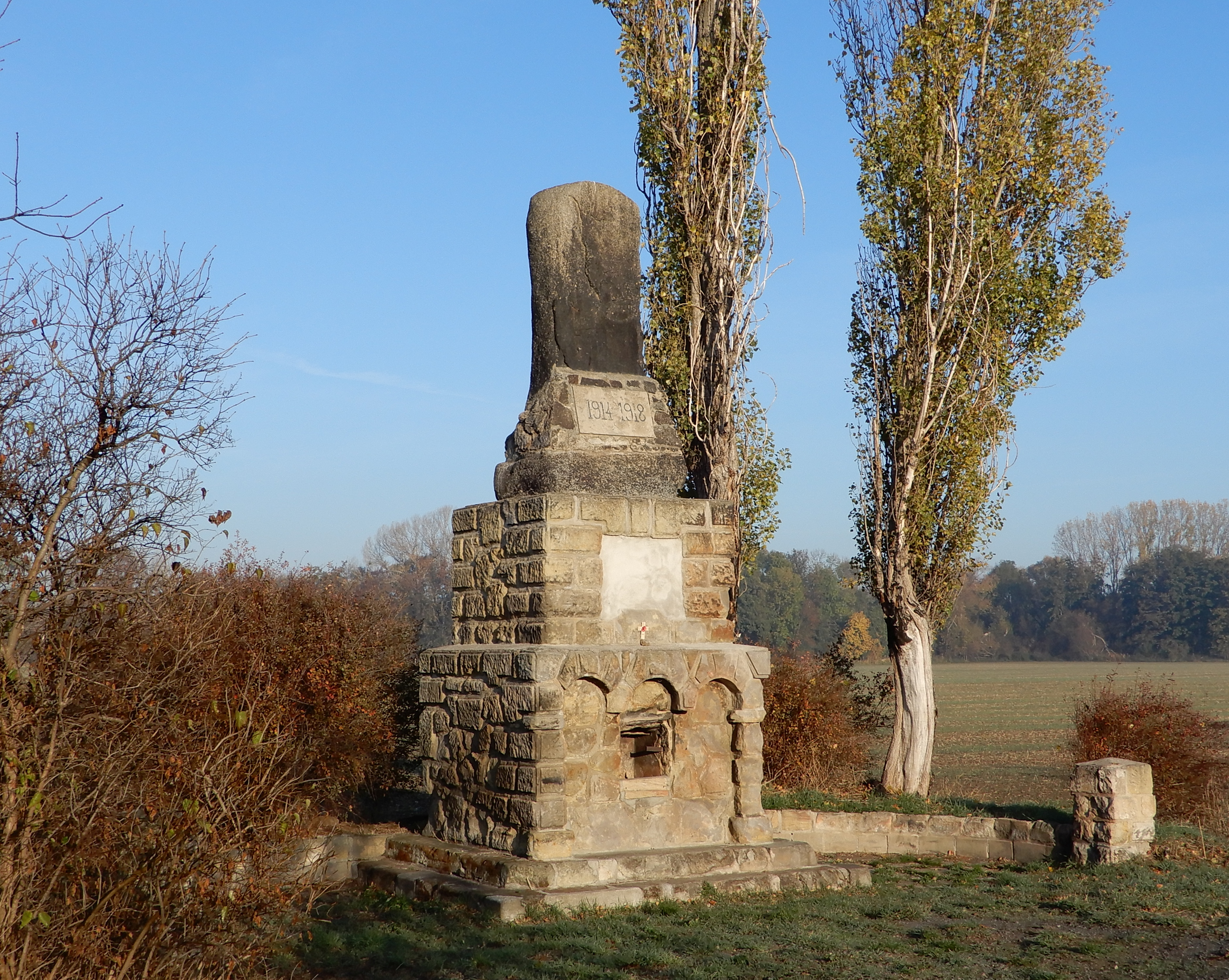
Memorial to the POW Camp Quedlinburg

Camp Quedlinburg was a POW camp built in September 1914 located 2 kilometers north of Quedlinburg, Germany, during the First World War. From 1914 to 1922, the camp housed 12,000 to 18,000 prisoners of war on average. Around 27,000 people lived in the neighbouring city of Quedlinburg at that time. There were three official branch offices in Staßfurt, Atzendorf and Aschersleben as well as other unofficial offices in Egeln, Halberstadt, Schönebeck, Groß Rodensleben, Schadeleben and Hedersleben.

== Camp ==
The camp was built on 104 hectares of land with 48 barracks for the prisoners. Barbed wire fences were erected to prevent escape attempts. In eight double rows, there were three barracks on each side of the gable. To the northeast, there were eight barracks for the guards, and on the western side of Ditfurter Weg, a number of large administrative buildings. At the northwest of the camp were three isolated sick shelters. Guard towers with machine guns stood in the middle of each long side and at strategically important points. The wooden barracks were about 52 meters long and 12 to 15 meters wide. The interior of the barracks was sparsely furnished. Each prisoner slept in an approximately 80 cm wide, 2 metre long wooden bed on straw sacks covered with woollen blankets. The barracks were divided into halves by transverse walls, each heated by an oven in the middle. At the southwest end of a block of six barracks was a kitchen building.

During the war, mainly Russian, French, Belgian and English, and also Italian soldiers were interned since 1917. From the beginning they were used to build up the camp and later as workers in labour detachments, especially in agriculture. On 9 December 1918, Theodor Cizeck Zeilau (1884-1970), a Captain in the Danish Army, made an inspection visit of the camp at Quedlinburg.

Even after the war it was used as a transit camp. It was not until 1921 that the last Russian prisoners left the camp, whereupon it was burned down. 703 prisoners of war were buried on a special part of the Quedlinburg central cemetery.

== Notable prisoners ==
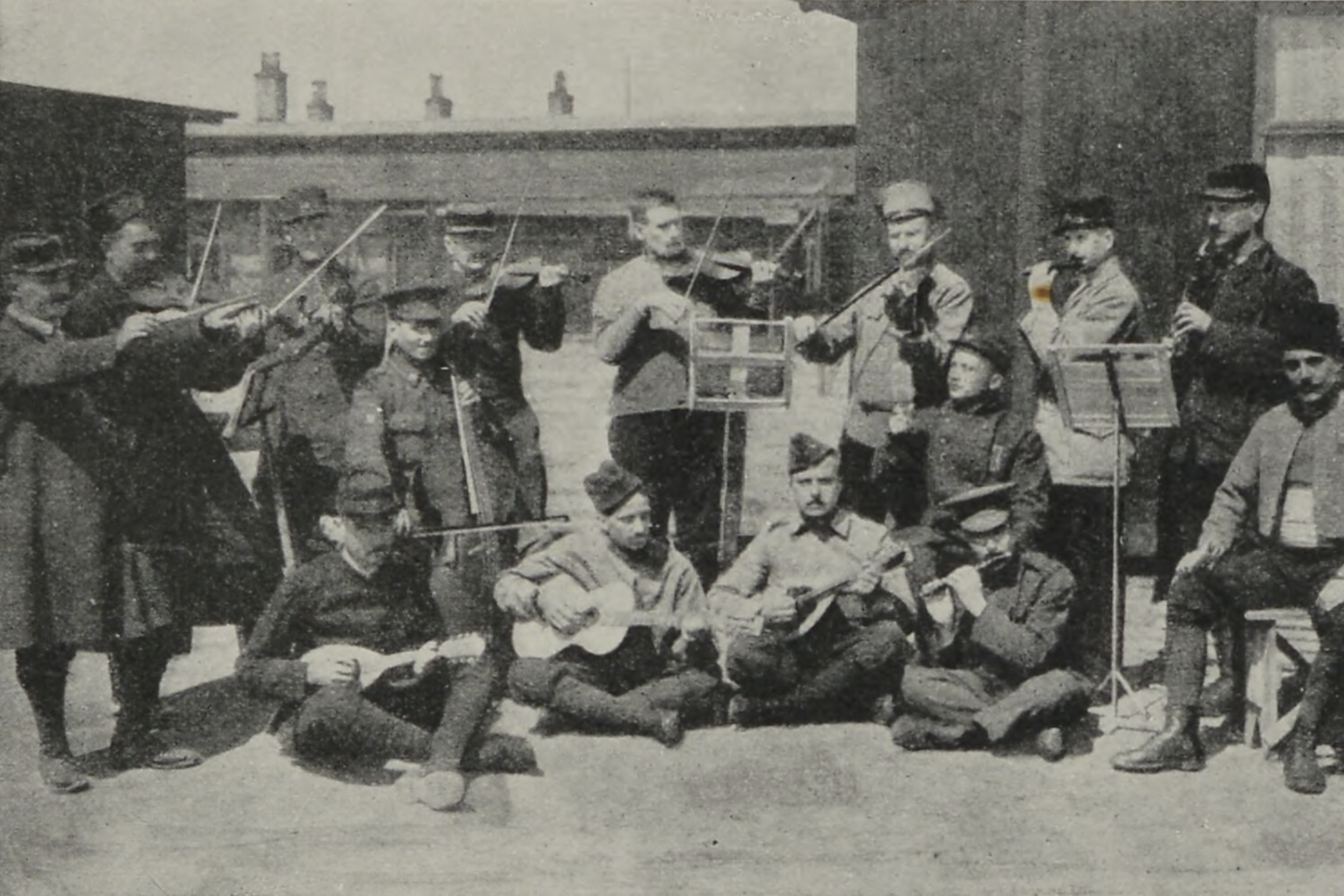
An Orchestra was formed of British, French, Belgians, and Russians, 1915

- W. K. Beaman, Captain
- W. E. Burrows, Sergeant, 3rd Worcestershire Regiment
- Wallace Roy Crichton, 46th Btn, Private, WIA & Captured Bapaume 11/4/1917-Interned Limburg/Quedlinburg Saxony-repatriated England 7/1/1918 RTA 30/6/1918
- Norman Cowan (1898–2003)
- Charles Darragh, 47th Battalion Private, Interned Quedlinburg- Arrived England admitted to 2nd London General Hospital 24/12/1918
- Harry Nutma Derrick, 37th Btn, Private, WIA & Captured-Died 12/11/1918 at Quedlinburg Hospital- buried Niederzwehren Cemetery Cassel
- John Gray Donn,
- Arthur Henry Fitt (1890–1954),
- Leonard Foust Hann, 33rd Battalion Private, WIA & Captured 7/5/1918-Interned Sachsen/Quedlinburg-arrived England admitted to King George Hospital 31/8/1918
- A. M. Hussey (died Octobre 12, 1918)
- Norman Elliott Lampe, 32nd Btn Private, WIA & Captured Fromelles 20/7/1916-Interned Stendal/Quedlinburg-repatriated Ripon 12/1/1919
- Frederick R. Lavender (died 1918), D Bty. 250th Bde, Royal Field Artillery
- Jacques Messiant
- Reginald Charles Prow, 20th Btn, Sergeant, WIA & Captured Mount St Quentin 31/8/1918-Interned Quedlinburg-repatriated Ripon 30/12/1918
- Fred Purvis (1894–1918), Gunner, 1/5th battalion, the Northumbrian Fusiliers
- Théophile Radin (1889–1918)
- Marcel Riegel
- Ernest Simonsen, 47th Btn, Private, WIA & Captured 5/4/1918-Interned Quedlinburg-repatriated Ripon 30/12/1918
- Henry Strachan (1898–1918), 8th Battalion Durham Light Infantry
- Aloïs Verleye

== See also ==
- World War I prisoners of war in Germany
- List of prisoner-of-war camps in Germany

== Bibliography ==
=== Photographs and letters ===
- Pictures from the Camp Quedlinburg
- Germany - Prisoner of War Camp: Quedlinburg, from The Badsey Society]

=== Memoirs ===
- Emden, Richard van (2000). Prisoners of the Kaiser. The last POWs of the Great War. South Yorkscher: Pen & Sword.
- Richard Charles Patrick: A Minute's Peace: Finding my WWI Grandfather. 2020. ISBN 979-8614621735.

=== Secondary works ===
- Demuth, Volker (2009). "'Those Who Survived the Battlefields' Archaeological Investigations in a Prisoner of War Camp Near Quedlinburg (Harz / Germany) from the First World War". Journal of Conflict Archaeology. 1 (5): 163–181. doi:10.1163/157407709X12634580640452. hdl:11250/2571574. S2CID 161594046., doi:10.1163/157407709X12634580640452
- Wozniak, Thomas (2011). ""... das Lager ist in jeder Beziehung musterhaft ...". Kriegsgefangene des Ersten Weltkriegs in Quedlinburg (1914–1922)". Jahrbuch für die Geschichte Mittel- und Ostdeutschlands. 57 (57): 125–154. doi:10.1515/9783110236651.125. S2CID 183451917., ISSN 2191-9909, ISSN 0075-2614, doi:10.1515/9783110236651.125
- Dorothy Jones: Quedlinburg men’s camp – Christmas in Denmark. Revised 16.1.2018.
